= Fredrica Löf =

Swedish actress (1760–1813)

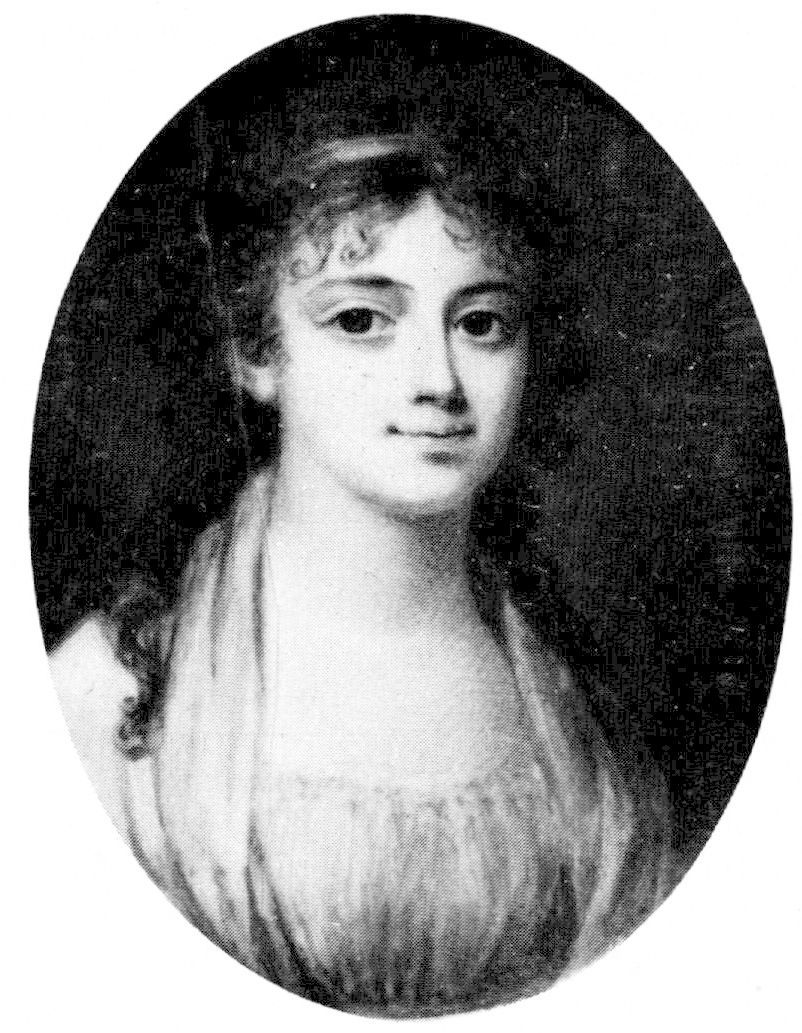
- Born: Johanna Fredrika Löf; October 1760; Stockholm, Sweden
- Died: 17 July 1813 (aged 52); Torsåker, Södermanland, Sweden
- Other names: Fredrique Löwen, Jeanette Fredrique Löf, Fredrique Löven, Fredrika Löven, Mamsell Löven

Fredrica Löf, also known as Fredrique Löwen (née Johanna Fredrika Löf; Stockholm, October 1760 – 17 July 1813), was a Swedish stage actress. She was the first female star at the newly founded national stage Royal Dramatic Theatre, which was founded the year of her debut.

== Life ==
Fredrica Löf was born at Torsåker in Södermanland, Sweden. She was the daughter of Johan Gottfrid Löf and Catharina Charlotta Stålhammar (or Stålhand). Her father was employed as a löpare, munskänk and taffeltäckare at the royal court, and had earlier been a footman of Lovisa Meijerfeldt. Originally named Löwe, he changed his surname to Löf.

Her date of birth is usually given as 4 December, but as she was baptized 7 October, she is believed to have been born in October shortly before her baptism. She was the godchild of the nobles Hedvig Catharina De la Gardie, Hans Henrik von Liewen and Hans Fredrik Ramel. The family was poor, and Fredrica had seven sisters and one brother.

=== Early life and career ===
Fredrica Löf and her sisters was early on, under the name the "Löven girls", known to be a part of the "more refined Stockholm demimonde" or high class prostitutes. Her sisters Charlotta and Lovisa both married Baron Axel Adam Hierta, and Lovisa later married Baron Victor von Stedingk. Fredrica Löf had her first child, out of wedlock, in 1779, and the year after she is registered as living alone in her own residence with her daughter Johanna Fredrika.

Likely from about 1780, Fredrica Löf was educated as a student in the French Theatre at Bollhuset in Stockholm under Jacques Marie Boutet de Monvel. Anne Marie Milan Desguillons was likely also a mentor of hers. She probably performed in smaller parts, like other Swedish students, such as Lars Hjortsberg did. It was common for French actors of this period to adopt a stage name. This was not as common in Sweden, but Fredrica Löf, who was educated in the French Theatre, adopted the French version of her first name as a stage name and changed her surname to her father's original name, and called herself "Fredrique Löwen". Commonly however, she was still referred to as Fredrica Löf, and this is also the most common name by which she is referred to in literature.

=== Career at the Royal Dramatic Theatre ===
In 1787, she was given a position at the Swedish language theatre of Adolf Fredrik Ristell in Bollhuset, and when it was transformed to the Royal Dramatic Theatre the following year, she became a member of its pioneer generation of actors.

Fredrica Löf made her debut at the Royal Dramatich Theatre of Stockholm the 6 May 1788 as Siri Brahe in "Siri Brahe and Johan Gyllenstierna" by king Gustav III of Sweden. Her debut was a success.

Marianne Ehrenström compared her with Marguerite Georges, and she was famed for "her well-sounding vocal organ as well as for her beautious Grecian-shaped face and her well-shaped figure, by which she, alongside much natural warmth in her play, enruptured her audience without effort" Her way of acting was described as "noble", with a sense of feeling and soul suitable for "tenderness, nobility and fierté"; her voice was described as clear and soft. She received much praise for her costume, a recommendation which is seen in contemporary sources; during this period, an actor was expected to design and finance their costumes themselves. She was also widely recommended by various critics for her elegance and good sense of costume.

Fredrica Löf was made premier actress in 1788 and celebrated her greatest successes during the regency years of 1792–1796. She was a high-ranked member of the theatre and called: "actress at the r. theatre of the first class". She was given an allowance of $600 from the Royal Opera in addition to her salary at the Royal Theatre.

Fredrica Löf was also an elective member of the actors board of directors. The Royal Dramatic Theatre was ruled by votings in board meetings every 14th day, managed by a board of eight elective actors under the authority of the Royal Swedish Academy of Art and the formal directory of the Royal Opera from 1788 until 1803, supervised by an official appointed by the Royal Opera. This made the actors staff of the royal court and obligated to perform for the royal court when summoned. In contrast to the staff of the Royal Opera and the French Theatre, the actors at the Royal Dramatic Theatre was not paid by the royal court but by shares in the theatre.

Fredrica Löf could not read text, and was forced to learn her part by having others reading her the scripts. Gustav Mauritz Armfelt, in his capacity of a member of the Royal Swedish Academy of Art, who supervised the theatre, wrote to the monarch in 1788 and asked if someone else could perform the part of Siri Brahe, and recommended the actress Gertrud Elisabeth Forsselius instead of Fredrika Löf. Officially because of health reasons, but the fact was that Fredrika Löf "Could not read texts, but had to learn her parts by having others read them to her", and added that the writer Carl Gustav af Leopold had to spend three hours with her to teach her the part because of this.

=== Roles ===
Among her parts were the title role in "Semiramis" by Voltaire, where she was admired for her "majestic" interpretation; the title roles in "Athalie" by Racine and "Drottning Christina" (1790) by Gustav III, as Mrs Ferval in "Den förtroliga aftonmåltiden" and as Susanna in "The Marriage of Figaro" by Beaumarchais (1799). She made many parts in plays by August von Kotzebue, Racine, Voltaire and Favart.

On 30 June 1791, she played the role of Amalia in "Den okände eller världsförakt och ånger" ("The stranger or Worldcontempt and anxiety") by August von Kotzebue, which was a great success for her. She was said to have performed the part with "a sensitivity beyond limits" which made "everyone cry", even the actresses from the French Theatre, who did not understand the language.

While Maria Franck and Sofia Frodelius performed tragedy and comedy respectively, and Ebba Morman took care of the "demonic" female parts such as witches and murderers, Fredrika Löf played the romantic parts of mistress and heroine, parts for which she was recommended for at least until 1801. She retired from stage after the 1808–09 season.

=== Private life ===
Fredrica Löf resided in a residence with expensive furniture at Gustav Adolfs torg, Stockholm, where she entertained the cultural elite, such as Carl Michael Bellman, Tobias Sergel and Louis Masreliez and her colleagues. She had her own carriage to take her to and from the theatre.

Fredrica Löf was much talked about for her private life. Among her lovers was the Sculptor Johan Tobias Sergel and the poet and journalist Johan Henric Kellgren. Fredrica Löf had a reputation of being a courtesan, but she did not like to be compared to actresses with a reputation for being courtesans. There was an incident when she found her reserved box at the Opera occupied by the actor Louise Götz, who had such a reputation.

Fredrica Löf never married, but she had three children, two daughters and a son. Her daughter, Jeanette Fredrique Fredrisen (1779–1854) married the opera singer Carl Magnus Craelius, singing master and teacher of Jenny Lind, and Fredrika Theresia Fredrisen (1780–1864) married major Anders Andersson (1767–1818) and the superintendent Jonas Peter Rundlöf (1787–1861). She also had a son, Johan Davidson, who became a sailor in 1802. Prince Frederick Adolf of Sweden has been pointed out as the father of her daughter, but it has never been confirmed that Fredrica Löf and Fredrick Adolf had a relationship, only that the prince and her sister Euphrosyne had one. Euphrosyne Löf became the official mistress of the Prince after Sophie Hagman in 1795.

At the time of her death, Fredrica Löf lived at the farm of her brother-in-law, Sörby, in Torsåker in Södermanland. According to Sergel, she was insane at the time of her death. According to her colleague Johan Fredrik Wikström she "died of some sort of disorder in the brain in about the age of fifty."

They are several images of Fredrica Löf kept at Nationalmuseum, many of them made by Sergel, usually during her last years at the stage.
