= Caroline Müller (1755–1826) =

Swedish opera singer

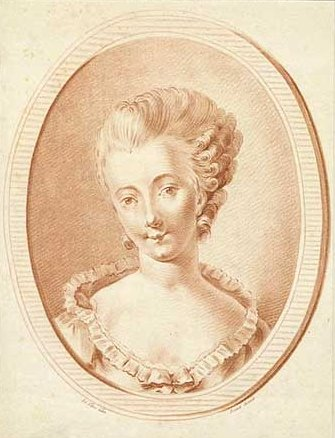
- Caroline Müller
- Born: Caroline Frederikke Halle; 5 February 1755; Copenhagen, Denmark.
- Died: 17 November 1826 (aged 71); Stockholm, Sweden.
- Other names: Caroline Halle, Caroline Walther.
- Spouse(s): Thomas Christian Walther (1774-80), Christian Friedrich Müller (from 1780)

Caroline Frederikke Müller née Halle (5 February 1755 – 17 November 1826) also known as Caroline Walther, was a Danish and later naturalized Swedish opera singer (mezzo-soprano). She was also active as an instructor at the Royal Dramatic Training Academy. She was a member of the Royal Swedish Academy of Music and a Hovsångare.

She was born as Caroline Halle, was known in Denmark as Caroline Walther (1774–80, during her first marriage) and known in Sweden as Caroline Müller (from 1780, after her second marriage).

== Life ==
She was the illegitimate daughter of the ensign Christian Frederik Halle and Johanne Christine Hansdatter. She was the half sister of the actor Ferdinand Lindgreen.

=== Career in Denmark ===
Her stepfather Thomas Jespersen was a machinist at the Royal Danish Theatre, and had her enrolled as a student in the Royal Danish Ballet in 1761, at the age of six. Soon, she was also assigned small children's parts at the theater. The theater had not yet an organized theater school, but she was tutored in declamation by Dorothea Biehl and drama by Lisbeth Cathrine Amalie Rose.

She debuted as an actress at the age of thirteen in the role of Pernille in Ludvig Holberg's Den Stundesløse in the season of 1768–69. She made a success and soon became the leading soubrette actress of the theater. In 1771, she made a debut as an opera singer in the main female part of Tronfølgen i Sidon by Giuseppe Sarti. In 1773, the theater organized an opera school, and she was successfully educated in opera singing by Michel Angelo Potenza.

In 1773 she left her abusive mother and the following year, she married the music director and secretary Thomas Christian Walther (1749–1788): the marriage ended in 1775 when he left Denmark, but she was thereafter known as Caroline Walther.

She performed over 124 roles at the opera theater: as a soubrette and tragedienne in theater productions, and in the female leads of the opera. As an opera singer, she also participated in concerts at the royal Danish court. She is considered to have had a great impact on the great age of Danish opera in the 1770s and has been referred to as the "perhaps greatest female stage artist" in Denmark at that time. She was painted by Jens Juel, praised by the poet Johannes Ewald and the Det norske Selskab, and the critic Peder Rosenstand-Goiske wrote: "The fire and emotion, that she understands to give her action, reveal the great genius of her mind."

In 1777, general H. H. von Eickstedt became director of the Royal Danish Theatre. von Eickstedt reportedly undermined her position because he wished to benefit the career of his lover, Catharine Frydendahl, and it is noted how he gave the role in Ewalds Fiskerne, which was written for her, to Frydendahl. The conflict culminated when von Eickstedt refused to give Caroline's lover, the German violinist Christian Friedrich Müller (1752–1827), a position in the theater, ordered him exiled from Denmark and delayed Caroline's divorce. Reportedly, the theater direction feared that they would lose her if she married a foreigner. In 1780, not long after Caroline had finally been granted her divorce, Christian Friedrich Müller left Denmark for Sweden, and soon after, Caroline left Denmark in the guise of a man after her performance as Louise in Desertøren and reunited with him in Gothenburg in Sweden, where they married. They had one child, Caroline (1791).

=== Career in Sweden ===
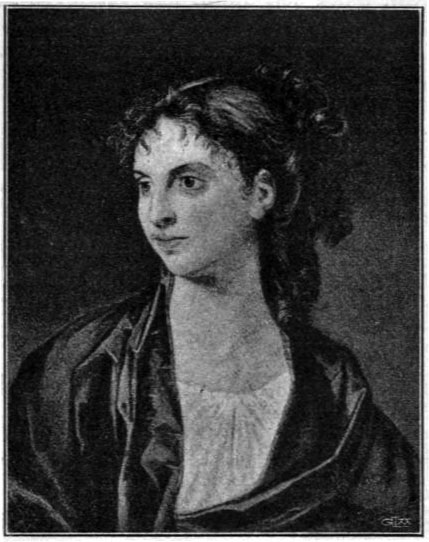
Karolina Müller

In 1780, Caroline Müller was engaged at the Royal Swedish Opera in Bollhuset in Stockholm, where she debuted in Alceste by Glück. Despite her Danish accent, she made a success, and Johan Henric Kellgren wrote: "Yesterday I cried for two hours at the opera, when Alceste was played for the first time: Mrs Müller made her debut. One might say that there had been no performance or an actress in Sweden before."

In 1782, as she was scheduled to perform in the inauguration performance of the new building of the Royal Swedish Opera, Caroline Müller and her spouse suddenly left her contract in Sweden and left for London to escape her creditors. In London, she became the first Danish opera singer to perform outside of the Nordic countries. In 1783, she returned to the Royal Swedish Opera when King Gustav III of Sweden offered her an immunity against her contract crime and raised her salary, and her husband was given a position at the Kungliga Hovkapellet.

When Elisabeth Olin retired in 1784, Müller effectively replaced her as the prima donna of the Royal Swedish Opera, performing in productions written by Italian, French, German and Swedish composers, some of which written by the king, Gustav III. Among her most celebrated parts where Armida and Iphigenie de Thauride by Glück. Her most famous part was arguably the role of Christina Gyllenstierna in Gustav Wasa by Johann Gottlieb Naumann with text by Kellgren and Gustav III and which was referred to as the national opera if Sweden. Her last performance was as Christina Gyllenstierna in Gustav Wasa for the newly elected crown prince Carl Johan Bernadotte in 1810. She was sculptured by J.T. Sergel and a friend of Edvard du Puy and Carl Michael Bellman.

In 1791, she visited Denmark and was present at a performance given to the benefit of her mentor, Lisbeth Cathrine Amalie Rose.

Caroline Müller also took students, and Lars Hjortsberg was among her students. From 1812 to 1815, she was the principal of the Royal Dramatic Training Academy in succession to Sofia Lovisa Gråå, which was a period of expansion and development of the school.

Caroline Müller was appointed Hovsångare and inducted into the Royal Swedish Academy of Music in 1788 (her spouse was also inducted the same year).

=== Roles ===
She played the title role in Alceste by Gluck with Carl Stenborg and Kristofer Kristian Karsten (season 1780–81); Anguelique in Roland by Philippe Quinault with Stenborg and Karsten (1781–82); Iphigenie in Iphigénie en Tauride by Gluck with Stenborg and Karsten; Christina Gyllenstierna in Gustaf Vasa by Gustav II composed by Naumann with Stenborg and Karsten (1785–86); Armide in Armide by Quinault with Stenborg and Karsten (1786–87); Christina of Holstein-Gottorp in Gustaf Adolf och Ebba Brahe (Gustav Adolf and Ebba Brahe) by Gustav III with Franziska Stading, Stenborg and Karsten (1787–88); Prosper in Azémia by Nicolas Dalayrac with Abraham de Broen and Karsten (1792–93); Aretea in Alcides inräde in världen (Alcides arrival into the world) by Haeffner with Carl Fredrik Fernstedt and Marie Louise Marcadet; Georgino in La soirée orageuse by Dalayrac with Abraham de Broen and Kjell Waltman; Josef in Les deux petits savoyards by Dalayrac with Kristofer Kristian Karsten and Marie Louise Marcadet (1793–94); Malena in De gamla friarna (The old Suitors) by Dalayrac with Kjell Waltman, Carl Magnus Craelius, Maria Franck and Inga Åberg; Lisette in Renaud d'Ast by Dalayrac with Karsten (1795–96); Colombine in Le tableau parlant by André Grétry with Carolina Kuhlman (1798–99); and Dido in Aeneas in Carthago (Aeneas in Carthage) with Stenborg and Karsten (1799–1800).

== Legacy ==
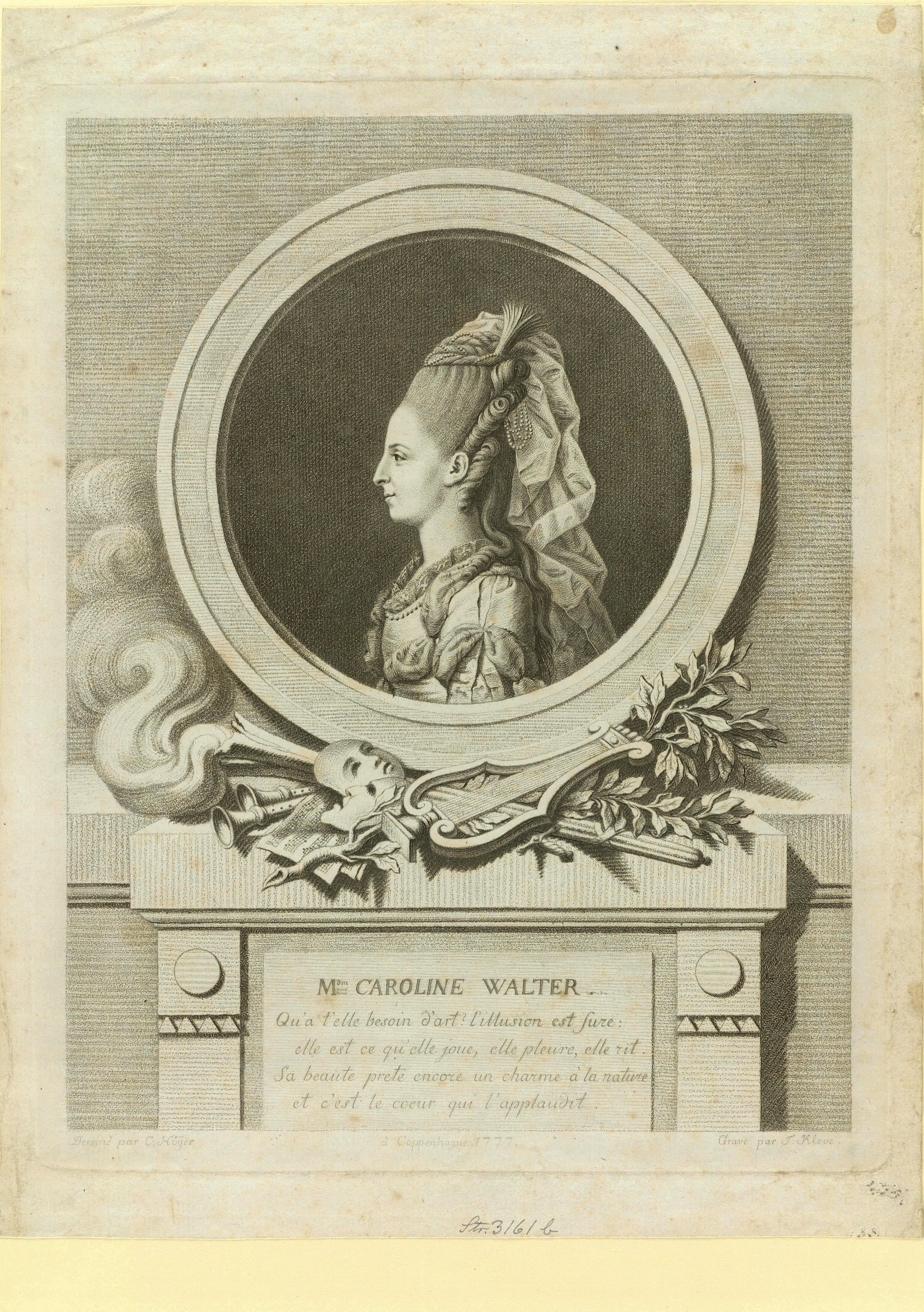
Carolina Müller

Gustav Löwenhielm mentioned her importance in Swedish theater and opera history in the 19th century, during a discussion about the employment of foreign artists, when he pointed out that several of the artists during the foundation of the Royal Swedish Opera and the Royal Dramatic Theatre had been foreigners:

"Is it impossible to engage Mr Berg and Miss Schoultz? - Generally, I can not see how we can elude the employment of half grown foreigners. Gustav III's Swedish national theatre started with the Danish Mrs Müller, the French Mrs Marcadet, the German Mamsell Stading, the German Mrs Augusti and the Polish Mrs Karsten. These ladies occupied our stage and kept it from the foundation of the opera and the premature departure of Mrs Olin in the beginning of the 1780s, until the year of 1800, when the school of Mrs Desguillons had created Mamsell Wässelia cum celeris."
