= Marie Baptiste =

French opera singer

- Born: Marie Dumont, Marie Du Mont. Bordeaux, France
- Other names: Mademoiselle le Prévost, Mademoiselle le Prevot.
- Spouse: Jacques Anselme Baptiste

Marie Baptiste (8 February 1733 Bordeaux, France – after 1786) was a French stage actress and singer. She is best known for her career in Sweden, where she was a leading member of the French Theatre in the mid 18th-century.

== Life ==
Marie Baptiste was born as Marie Dumont or Du Mont in Bordeaux in France. She was active as an actress with the stage name Mademoiselle le Prévost or Mademoiselle le Prevot. In February 1754 in The Hague, she married her colleague, the actor Jacques Anselme Baptiste (1732-?) and became known as Madame Baptiste. She became the mother of two daughters and two sons, notably her daughter Maria Louise Baptiste.

=== French theater in Sweden ===
In 1756, Marie Baptiste and her spouse where engaged by theater director Louis Du Londel to the French theater in Sweden. Louis Du Londel recruited eight new members to the Theater in his journey to The Hague, of which Marie Baptiste were counted as the most significant.

The French Du Londel theater in Sweden performed for the Royal Swedish court in the palace theaters of Confidencen and Drottningholm Palace Theater during the summers, and for the public in the Bollhuset theater in Stockholm during the winters. It was a significant theater with about twenty members, patronized by the royal court and the aristocracy. Her spouse was engaged as the French language teacher of the heir to the throne, Crown Prince Gustav.

The French Theater was organized in accordance to a strict hierarchical categorization system. Marie Baptiste was contracted to play the female leading roles of tragedies and comedies of the Comédie-Française and Comédie-Italienne as well as the breeches roles of the opéra comique, while her husband was contracted to play supporting roles. Marie Baptiste attracted particular appreciation as a tragedienne, and Prince Gustav compared her to the Marie Dumesnil in Paris. She had one of her biggest successes in Gabrielle de Vergy by Belloy.

Marie Baptiste was also a singer, and performed in several concerts at the Riddarhuset between 1759 and 1771.

=== The theatre fire ===
Marie Baptiste is remembered in connection to the fire of the first Drottningholm Palace Theatre. On 25 August 1762, in the middle of the fifth act of the play performed in honor of the queen's name's day, Maria Baptiste rushed out on stage and cried out that the theater was on fire. The incident is described in a letter from the nobleman Knut Henrik Leijonhufvud to Carl Christoffer Gjörwell:

The 4th act had just been performed and the orchestra played some music... at last, the theater called for silence with the customary clap; and at that moment. Madame Baptiste came rushing through the theater and made a gesture, which illustrated all her despair; no one thought anything but that it was a part of the play. Having noticed that it had no effect, she was the only one to have the composure to return and then she only said with half muffled voice, Le feu - and saved herself immediately.

After this, panic occurred as the fire spread quickly in the wooden building, and Leijonhufvud described how a nobleman took the princess under one arm and another nobleman the two youngest princes, how the queen and the crown prince argued about who were to leave first, and how he himself gave way to "the poor ladies, who on account of their big skirts was in terrifying danger", while the whole building was burning around them. In the end, the fire lead to the death of four people: a maid, a boy and two "servants", outside of the material losses, which were a catastrophe for the actors because their living quarters were in the same building and they thereby lost all their possessions. By the quick alarm of Baptiste, however, more lives were saved than what was otherwise estimated to have been the case, and Marie Baptiste was therefore seen as a heroine and awarded a pension by the Riksdag of the Estates. In 1769, Marie Baptiste renounced her pension in exchange for a capital sum.

=== Later life ===
In 1771, the French Du Londel theater was dissolved by king Gustav III of Sweden after his succession to the throne. The Baptiste family, consisting of Marie Baptiste, her spouse and their four children, left Sweden and toured Europe, but was not able to secure a contract in any theater.

In 1776, they returned to Sweden, where they did not succeed in their intention to start a theater school with their daughter Marie Louise as principal, but Gustav III restored the pension previously awarded her for her role in the theater fire evacuation, and her spouse was engaged as a violinist at the Royal orchestra. They belonged to the little group of French artists that staged French language plays for the Swedish royal court of Gustav III in a smaller scale for five years, until the engagement of the French Theater of Gustav III in 1781. When her husband lost his position at the Royal orchestra in 1786, he and Marie Baptiste left Sweden permanently.

== See also ==
- Marguerite Morel
- Jeanne Du Londel
- Elisabeth Soligny
