= Annual general meeting =

Meeting of the general membership of an organization

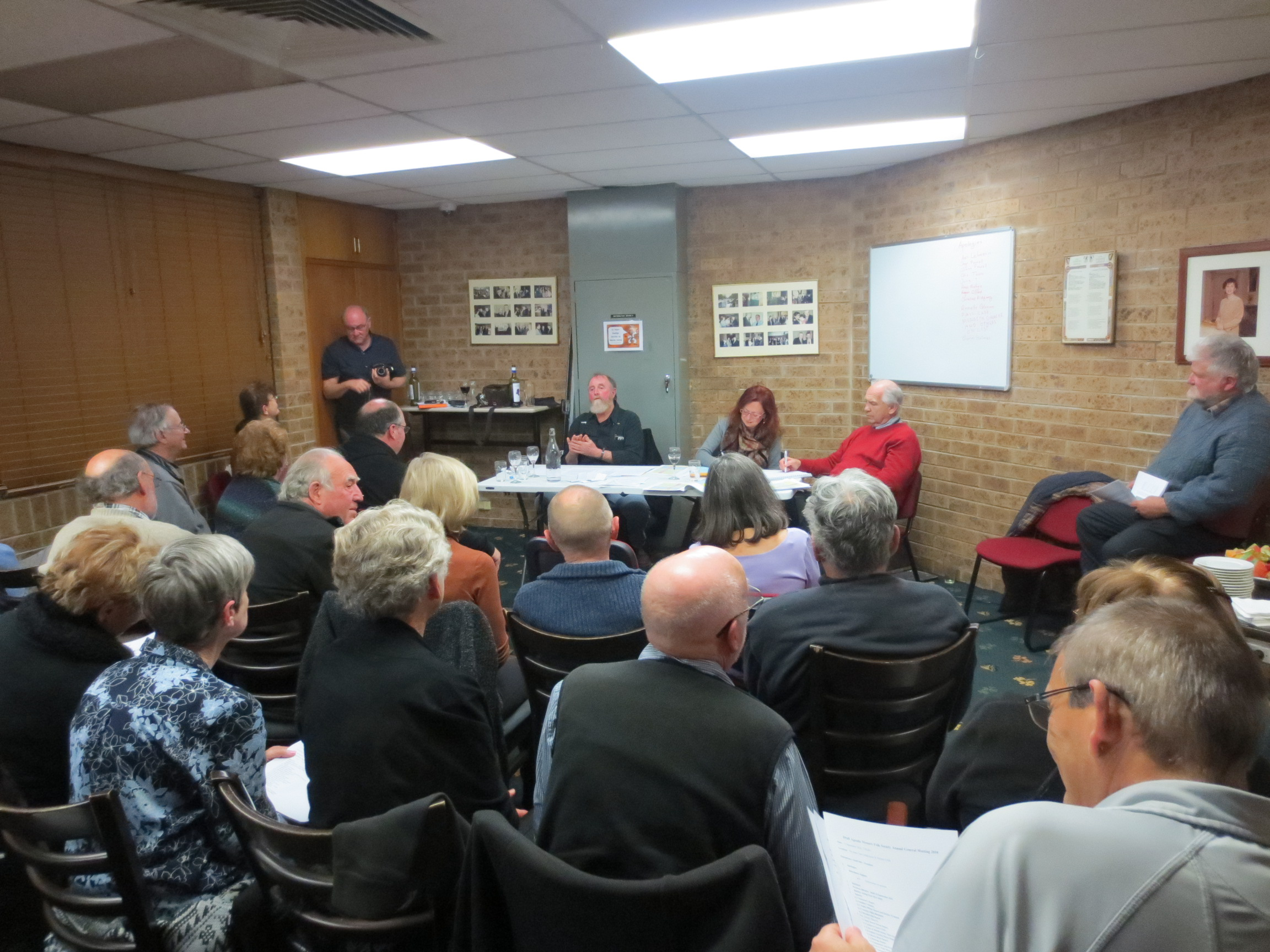
Typical AGM of a volunteer organization (141 members). Sitting at the table are its officer bearers: president, public officer and secretary.

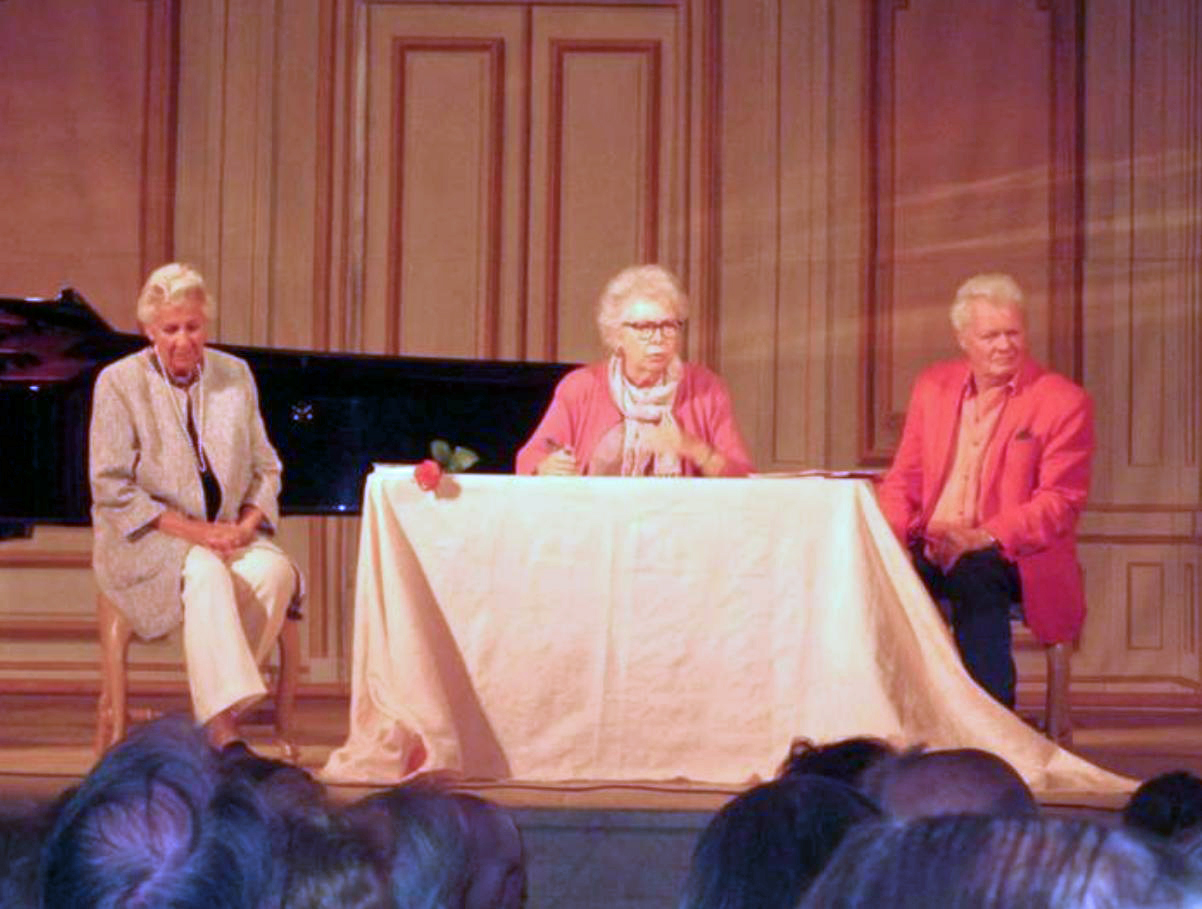
Annual meeting in 2015 of the Friends of the Ulriksdal Palace Theatre chaired by Princess Christina, Mrs. Magnuson

An annual general meeting (AGM, also known as the annual meeting) is a meeting of the general membership of an organization.

These organizations include membership associations and companies with shareholders.

These meetings may be required by law or by the constitution, charter, or by-laws governing the body. The meetings are held to conduct business on behalf of the organization or company.

== Purpose ==
An organization may conduct its business at the annual general meeting. The business may include electing a board of directors, making important decisions regarding the organization, and informing the members of previous and future activities. At this meeting, the shareholders and partners may receive copies of the company's accounts, review fiscal information for the past year, and ask any questions regarding the directions the business will take in the future.

At the annual general meeting, the president or chairman of the organization presides over the meeting and may give an overall status of the organization. The secretary prepares the minutes and may be asked to read important papers. The treasurer may present a financial report. Other officers, the board of directors, and committees may give their reports. Attending this meeting are the members or the shareholders of the organization, depending on the type of organization.

At such a meeting, the company secretary of the company plays a crucial role in convening, conduct, and to attend the meeting. They may be supported by their corporate secretarial team.

== By country ==
=== Canada ===
Under the Canada Not-for-Profit Corporations Act, non-profit Canadian organizations must hold an annual general meeting and report its date to the government in its annual report.

=== India ===
==== Public companies in India ====
In India, the Companies Act 2013 regulates the requirement to conduct an annual meeting of the members to discuss the four ordinary businesses. Under section 96 of the act, every company requires to conduct such a meeting by serving a notice of 21 days' minimum length prior to the meeting either at the latest known address or email address of each member. However, a company may conduct such a meeting through the issue of a notice of shorter length with prior approval of not less than 95% of the members entitled to vote at such meeting. The members elect the auditors of the company in the annual general meeting.

The act also mandates that such meeting shall be within prescribed time 9:00 am to 6:00 pm, to be not held on national holidays, and also to be conducted at the place/town/village where the registered office of the company situated. However, in the recent trends, as per the latest amendment notified by the Corporate Affairs ministry in India, the unlisted public companies may conduct such meeting in any part of India by taking in advance unanimous approval from all the members in writing or electronically.

The four business includes 1) financial statement approval, 2) appointment of director, 3) appointment and to fix the remuneration of statutory auditor, and 4) declare the dividend.

==== Private companies in India ====
In India, the Companies Act 2013 regulates the requirement to conduct a meeting of its members have participation/hold in the share capital of the company to meet on annual basis in a general meeting called annual general meeting within the prescribed time window of 9:00 am to 6:00 pm on other than national holidays to discuss some important business includes financial statements approval.

Unlike the other countries, every company incorporated in India require to conduct such meeting on or before the due date on the last day of the sixth month of every closing of the financial year.

In India, the act has recently undergone major changes. The Corporate Affairs Ministry has recently enforced a new amendment act, Companies 2nd Amendment Act 2017, from 26 January 2018.

=== Singapore ===
In Singapore, only public companies must hold AGMs. With effect from 31 August 2018, private limited companies can decide whether they want AGMs or not. Private companies can be exempted from holding AGMs if they send their financial statements to their members within five months after the financial year end (FYE).

To dispense with AGMs, company members need to pass a resolution. All the shareholders must endorse the document for it to come into force. Having dispensed with AGMs, companies pass written resolutions on matters that would otherwise be discussed at AGMs.

The resolution putting an end to AGMs may cease to be in force – members can adopt a new resolution to revoke the dispensation. In this case, an AGM must be held if at least three months remain to its due date.

If a private company decides to have AGMs, it must adhere to the deadlines. The annual general meeting must be held within six months after the FYE. Next, every company must lodge the obligatory annual return within one month after its AGM.

=== United Kingdom ===
In the United Kingdom, through the passing of the Companies Act 2006, it became optional with effect from 1 October 2007 for a private company to hold an AGM, unless its articles of association specifically require it to do so.

=== United States ===
Every state requires public companies incorporated within its jurisdiction to hold an annual general meeting of shareholders to elect the board of directors and transact other business that requires shareholder approval. Notice of the annual general meeting must be in writing and is subject to a minimum notice period that varies by state. In 2007, the Securities and Exchange Commission voted to require all public companies to make their annual meeting materials available online. The final rules required compliance by large accelerated filers beginning on 1 January 2008, and by all other filers beginning on 1 January 2009. The "e-proxy" rules allow two methods for companies to deliver their proxy materials, the "notice only" option or the "full set" option. Under the notice only option, the company must post all of its proxy materials on a publicly accessible website at the time.

== See also ==
- Convention (meeting)
- Corporate law
- Extraordinary general meeting
