= Louis Gallodier =

French ballet dancer and choreographer

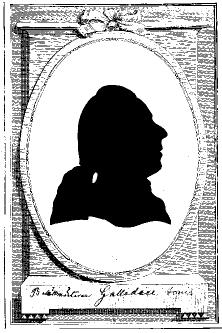
Louis Gallodier

Louis Gallodier (c. 1734 – 6 June 1803) was a French ballet dancer and choreographer who spent the majority of his career in Sweden, where he was to have a great importance for the development of the ballet in Sweden as the ballet master of the Royal Swedish Ballet.

== Biography and career ==
Louis Gallodier was born in France circa 1734. He was employed at the opera Opéra-Comique in Paris from 1756. As a dancer, he was a student of Jean-Georges Noverre. In 1758, he was hired as a member of the French Du Londel Troupe, which performed in the theatre of Bollhuset in Stockholm and in the court theatres Drottningholm Palace Theatre and Confidencen.

When the French troupe was fired in 1771 by Gustav III of Sweden, who wanted to found a national stage with native actors, the dancers of the French theatre were excluded from being fired. When the Swedish Royal Ballet was founded in 1773, several of them, such as the ballerina Ninon Dubois le Clerc, was to be a part of its first troupe, and Gallodier was made its first ballet master. Elisabeth Soligny, his colleague from the French troupe, was often paired with him in the Ballets. Gallodier also composed several dances to ballets and operas. One of his pupils and dancers where Sophie Hagman.

Louis Gallodier was in 1762-84 married to the Italian opera singer Gasparine Becheroni, active at the Italian opera company in Stockholm; in 1792 to the Swedish ballerina Judith Christina Brelin (1770–1794), and from 1796 with Marie Louise Du Londel (1776–1847), daughter of Louis Du Londel and Marguerite Morel of the Du Londel Troupe.

== Works ==
- Sylvie, opéra de Pierre Montan Berton (1774)
- Neptun och Amphitrite, opéra-ballet (1775)
- Æglé, opéra-ballet (1775)
- Adonis, opéra-ballet de Thomas Christian Walter (1776)
- Procris och Cephal, opéra de Lars Lalin (1778)
- Zemire och Azor, comédie-ballet d'André Grétry (1778)
- Arsène, féerie-comédie de Monsigny (1779)
- Atys, opéra-ballet de Piccinni (1784)

== See also ==
- Julie Alix de la Fay
- Giovanna Bassi
- Antoine de Beaulieu

Preceded by New position	Director of the Royal Swedish Ballet; 1773–1803	Succeeded by Filippo Taglioni
