= Samuel Ahlgren =

Swedish actor

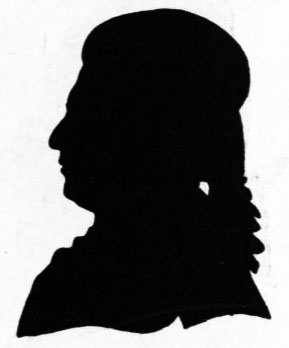
Samuel Ahlgren

Johan Samuel Ahlgren (1764–1816) was a Swedish actor. He was an elite actor of the Royal Dramatic Theatre and belonged to the pioneer generation of actors there.

== Life ==
Samuel Ahlgren was born to the clerk Lars Ahlgren and Elisabet Fredrika Fredriksson. He married Albertina Griberg in 1793. He initially worked as a clerk.

=== Career ===
He was engaged by Fredric Ristell in the newly founded Swedish language Ristell theatre in Bollhuset in 1787.

Ahlgren was described as a beauty with a pure and clear voice, and was recommended for his clear pronunciation and for his posture. He played both hero and villain, though he was criticized for overacting because of his hot temperament. Because of his good looks, he was often given the parts of lovers.

His most acclaimed part was Axel Oxenstierna in Drottning Kristina by Gustav III of Sweden (1790). Among his other parts was Soliman in Soliman II eller de tre sultaninnorna by Martin Krause in the 1789–90 season, Appius in Virginia by Paykull and Johan Gyllenstjerna in Siri Brahe och Johan Gyllenstierna by Gustav III of Sweden in the 1790–91 season.

When the theatre of Ristell went bankrupt in 1788, the Royal Dramatic Theatre was founded by king Gustav III of Sweden, which was to be managed by a board of directors composed by the actors themselves under the supervision of the Royal Swedish Academy of Fine Arts.

The first supervisor from the academy was the nobleman Gustav Mauritz Armfelt, and the cooperation between him and the actors was stormy. Armfelt felt contempt for the acting profession, often made use of disciplinarian punishments, and lacked patience for the conflict which often affected the board meetings. Ahlgren and Abraham de Broen were the actors who were often in conflict with Armfelt.

Armfelt wrote to a friend:

"It is only with the utmost severity I am able to govern this rabble, and as soon as they tried to defy me, I beat de Broen at the stage with a cane and slapped Ahlgren, and I was so determined to continue with this way of rule, that I would have cut off their ears, if any of these gentlemen dare talk to me about rights."

To the king, however, Armfelt reported his great success in his rule over the theatre. King Gustav III of Sweden was aware of the low status of the profession of acting, and therefore often gave the actors formal titles to rise their status. Ahlgren was accordingly given the title of royal quarter master of the court. Armfelt was quickly replaced as the representative from the academy and "director" of the theatre, but the conflicts between the appointed directors and the actors continued, represented by Ahlgren and De Broen.

In 1794, Ahlgren challenged the academy's representative, the nobleman Claes Rålamb, to a duel, and was taken to the regent, Duke Charles, who wanted to put him in jail. This incident caused Ahlgren to be fired from the Royal Dramatic Theatre, despite him, and then his wife, kneeling to the regent.

He was then employed at the Stenborg theatre, where he was enthusiastically welcomed: many actors from the Royal Dramatic Theatre left for the Stenborg Theatre during periods of conflicts with the management, such as Marie Louise Marcadet also did in 1795.

Ahlgren returned to the Royal Dramatic Theatre in 1796. He retired in 1815.
