= Anne Marie Milan Desguillons =

French stage actress

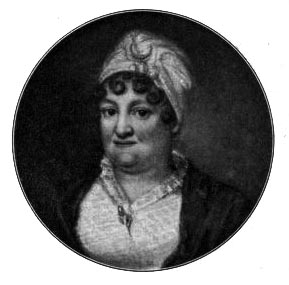
- Born: Anne Marie Milan; 8 May 1753; Aignay-le-Duc, France
- Died: 28 July 1829 (aged 76); Drottningholm, Sweden
- Spouse: Joseph Sauze Desguillons

Anne Marie Milan Desguillons née Milan (8 May 1753 – 28 July 1829) was a French stage actress. She was active in the French Theater of Gustav III in Sweden in 1781–92, and principal of the Royal Dramatic Training Academy jointly with Joseph Sauze Desguillons 1793–98.

== Life ==
Anne Marie Milan debuted in Le Havre 1773, and was active in Lille 1774–75.

=== French theater of Gustav III ===
In 1781, she arrived in Sweden as a member of the newly created French theater troupe of Jacques Marie Boutet de Monvel, which was engaged by king Gustav III of Sweden to perform for the Swedish royal court.

The French Theatre performed at the court theatres in Gripsholm Castle, Drottningholm Palace Theatre and Confidencen at Ulriksdal Palace for the Swedish royal court: from the season of 1783–84, they also performed for the public at Bollhuset in Stockholm in winters, though the audience normally consisted exclusively of the upper class society, who could speak French.

Anne Marie Milan Desguillons became a highly valued member of the French theater and was favored by the king. To her appearance, she was described as heavily overweight and not regarded to be beautiful, but she was much praised for her artistic talent and enjoyed great respect particularly within the court. She was foremost a tragedienne, performed in tragedies and mére nobleroles, and was normally given main parts in the French tragedies. Among her parts was Merope, Semiramis and Athalie, but she did occasionally perform comic parts, such as Madame Turcaret.

In 1789, she married her colleague Joseph Sauze Desguillons, and thus required the name Desguillons.

=== Instructor and principal ===
After the assassination of Gustav III in 1792, the French theater was dissolved. Desguillons retired from the stage but chose to remain in Sweden.

In 1793, Anne Marie Milan Desguillons and her spouse Joseph Sauze Desguillons where appointed joint principals of the Royal Dramatic Training Academy. The academy had been founded in 1787, but the Desguillons couple was responsible for giving it a proper organisation, which was kept by their successor Sofia Lovisa Gråå.

The two Desguillons were also instructors at the school. They instructed the students in drama, while the music lessons was given by Johann Christian Friedrich Hæffner and L. Piccini, and the dancing lessons by Julie Alix de la Fay and Jean-Rémy Marcadet. They pupils where enrolled at the age of nine or ten and performed as child actors in minor plays as well as in special pupil's plays staged by the school.

She was responsible for the female students, and her husband for the male students. They are known as the mentors of many later famous Swedish stage artists in Swedish theater history, and thus contributed greatly in shaping the contemporary Swedish acting method in a French pattern. Among her more known students was Jeanette Wässelius, Sofia Frodelius, Ulrika Wennerholm and Carolina Kuhlman. Anne Marie Milan Desguillons retired as a principal in 1798.

In 1803, king Gustav IV Adolf of Sweden engaged a French theatre company to perform, and the Desguillons couple were made joint directors responsible of the company during its stay in Sweden. They kept this role until the French company left in 1806.

== See also ==
- Marie Louise Marcadet
- Marie Baptiste
