= Lars Hjortsberg =

Swedish actor

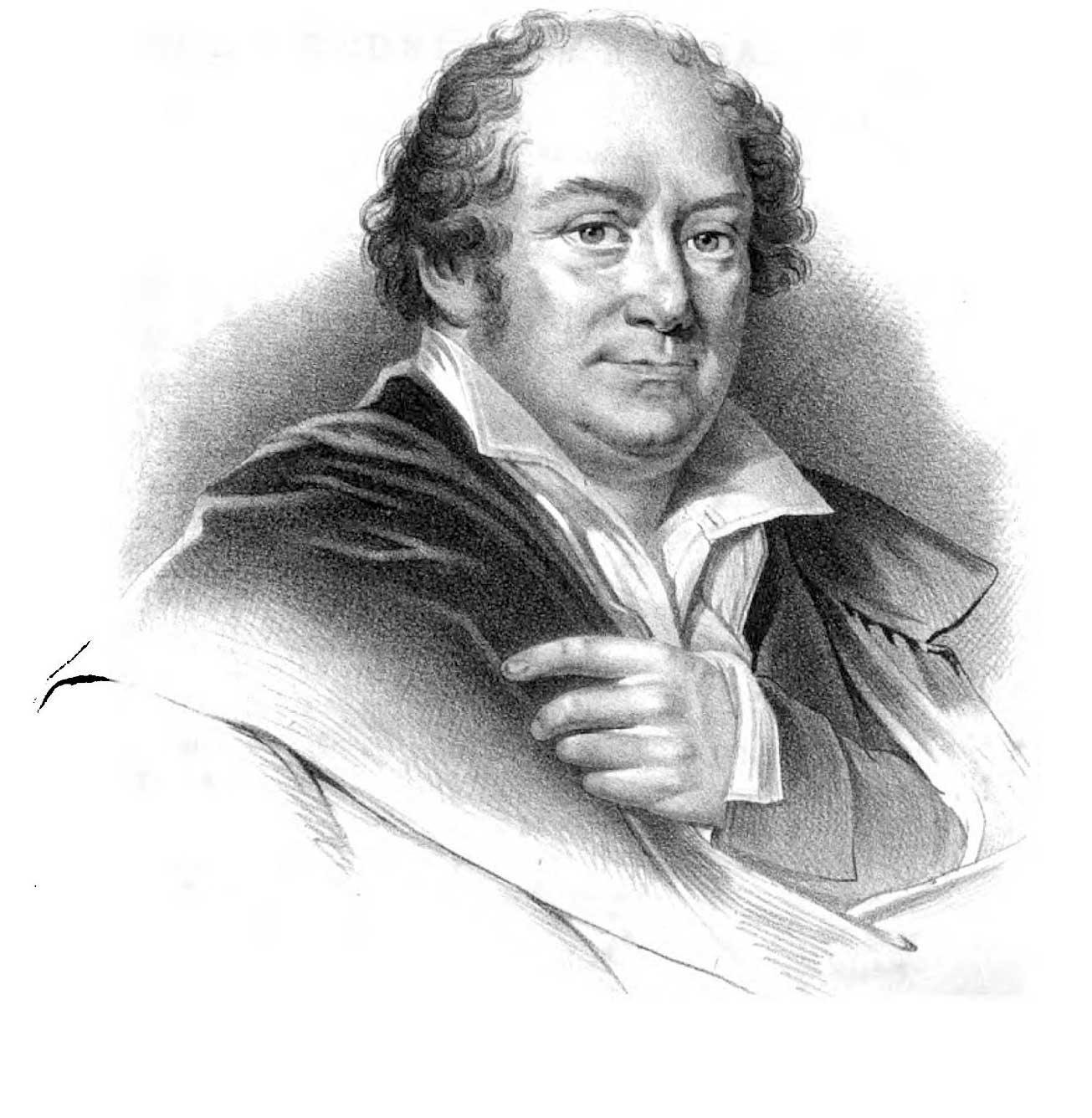
- Lithography by Johan Cardon
- Born: Lars Hjortsberg; 22 November 1772; Stockholm, Sweden
- Died: 8 July 1843 (aged 70); Nyköping, Sweden
- Spouse: Sofia Katarina di Dosmo

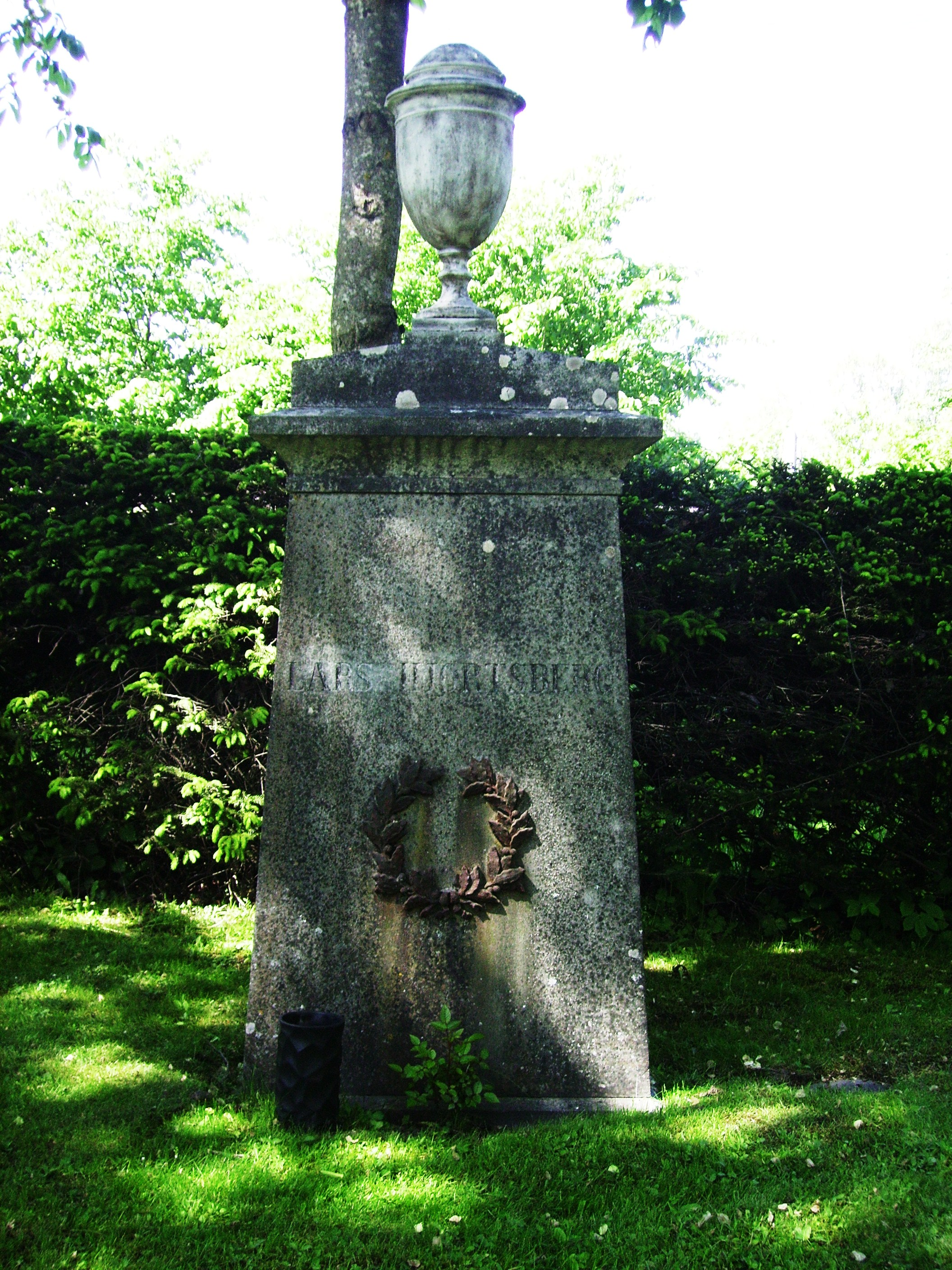
Lars Hjortsberg's grave at Västra kyrkogården, Nyköping.

Lars Hjortsberg (22 November 1772 – 8 July 1843) was a Swedish stage actor. He belonged to the pioneer generation of elite actors of the Royal Dramatic Theatre and has, alongside Emilie Högquist, been referred to as the most famous Swedish actor of the first half of the 19th century.

== Biography ==
Lars Hjortsberg was one of six children to the stonemason Laurentius (Lars) Hjortsberg and the opera singer Maria Lovisa Schützer: he was the brother of the ballerina Hedda Hjortsberg and the actor Magnus Hjortsberg. He married Sofia Katarina di Dosmo, daughter to an Italian employee of the royal stables, and became the father of actor Carl Edvard Hjortsberg (1804–1857) and father-in-law of Fanny Westerdahl. He and his wife where widely known for their hospitality and their home was a center of the social life of the theater world.

=== Court service ===
He was noticed by the theatrically interested King Gustav III of Sweden, who saw a great dramatic talent in him, and hired him at the royal court as a so-called garçon bleu, a common (non noble) page boy, reader and librarian. He kept his position at the royal court until the assassination of the king in 1792, and accompanied the king to the Russo-Swedish War (1788–1790) and to the Austrian Netherlands in 1791. He read to the king on his deathbed to amuse him.

=== Stage career ===
Lars Hjortsberg made his debut at the Royal Swedish Opera at the age of six in 1778, when he played an angel with a couple of lines at the celebration of the birth of the Crown Prince in Athalie. He was engaged at the Opera in 1780. He performed in a mute part as the brother of Cora in Cora och Alonzo by Naumann at the inauguration performance of the new Opera house in 1782. He was a student of Caroline Frederikke Müller in 1783–85, and a student actor of the French Theatre of Bollhuset under Monvel, similar to many other Swedish star actors of his generation such as Fredrique Löwen, Maria Franck and Inga Åberg. In 1787, he was enrolled in the Royal Dramatic Training Academy, and performed in a student play for the king the same year.

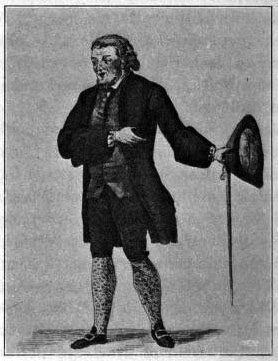
Lars Hjortsberg as The Jew, c. 1800

When the Royal Dramatic Theatre was founded in 1788, he became a member of the theater's board of directors. He was a member of its pioneer generation of actors and counted among its leading members until his retirement. Lars Hjortsberg was very appreciated in comedies, and one of his most popular roles were as Polycarpus in Kronfogdarne. On 24 November 1825, the theater building of the Arsenal Theatre burned down in the midst of a performance. Lars Hjortsberg discovered the fire, interrupted the play and informed the audience from the stage. The building was with narrow passages and only one exit which could have led to many casualties if Hjortsberg had not directed the evacuation with such calmness and efficiency that no one was killed, which made him a hero in the eyes of the public, who greeted him with great applause at his next performance at the building at the Royal Swedish Opera, where the Royal Dramatic Theatre would now also be located.

When the actors board of directors was replaced by an appointed director in 1803, the fame of Hjortsberg forced the management to accept criticism from him, and he was therefore somewhat of a spokesperson for the actors against the management, who was generally very strict.

He retired after the failed second strike of Ulrik Torsslow and Sara Torsslow in 1834, but he soon returned. He gave his last performance in 1842. He died in Nyköping and was buried at Västra kyrkogården.

== Fiction ==
Lars Hjortsberg is portrayed in a novel by Agneta Pleijel, Kungens komediant ( Norstedts : 2007).

== Other sources ==
- Erik Näslund and Elisabeth Sörenson, Kungliga Dramatiska Teatern 1788–1988
- Nordensvan, Georg, Svensk teater och svenska skådespelare från Gustav III till våra dagar. Förra delen, 1772–1842, Bonnier, Stockholm, 1917 ['Swedish theatre and Swedish actors from Gustav III to our days. First book 1772–1842'] (Swedish)
- Svenska män och kvinnor, uppslagsverk
- Klas Åke Heed: Ny svensk teaterhistoria. Teater före 1800, Gidlunds förlag (2007)
