= Ebba Morman =

Swedish actress

Ebba Jeanette Morman (1769 – 9 October 1802) was a Swedish stage actress. She was active at the Royal Dramatic Theatre in 1791–1802 and was popular actress, known for her demonic character portraits.

== Life ==
Ebba Morman married cleric Johan Peter Brolin in 1788, but was divorced by 1792, when she signed a contract with the name Ebba Jeanette de Morman. She had a relationship with the actor Carl Schylander from 1792 to her death from tuberculosis in 1802. They married shortly before her death.

=== Career ===
Morman debuted at the Royal Dramatic Theatre in 1791. She performed at the Royal Swedish Opera before she was contracted at the Royal Dramatic Theatre in 1792. She was a valued member of the Royal Dramatic Theatre and had the position to refuse to be a replacement for any actors than the two female stars, Fredrique Löwen and Marie Louise Marcadet. She also performed as a guest actor at the Stenborg Theatre.

She was a tragedienne, but she is foremost remembered as a star within "diabolical" female parts. She played witches, murderers and other "demonical" roles, and reached such fame within her interpretations of negative characters that "the audience loved and hated her" She was described as: ”Tall and thin, with a long face, sharp chin and black eyes, emanating a gloomy fire. The pale skin was as if pasted on her cheeks. Her appearance answered completely to her genre, which was the diabolical one Her ability was said to be: "Terrific within coquettish, heinous woman roles, poison makers, tyrants etc."
