= Julie Alix de la Fay =

French ballerina and choreographer (1748–1826)

Léonne-Julie Alix de la Fay, also known as Julianne Bournonville and Madame Alix (14 December 1748 – 14 March 1826), was a French ballet dancer and dance instructor. She played an important part in the development of the Royal Swedish Ballet. She was the sister of the famous ballet dancer Antoine Bournonville and the aunt of August Bournonville.

== Life and career ==
She was born Léonne-Julie Bournonville in Brussels, Austrian Netherlands, on 12 December 1748, as the child of the French actors Louis-Amable Bournonville and Jeanne Evrard, members of the theatre troupe of Charles-Simon Favart.

She accompanied her parents to Lyon in the troupe of Noverre in 1759-60 and debuted in La Ciaconne by Jean Dupré in Vienne in 1765. She performed at the Mariinsky Theatre in Saint Petersburg under Gasparo Angiolini, and in Cassel in 1772–81.

She arrived in Sweden in 1782, where she joined the Royal Swedish Ballet at the Royal Swedish Opera in Stockholm. In 1783, she was made premier dancer. On 8 February that same year, she married Claude Alix de la Faye, the French dentist of the queen - in contrast with many other contemporary female dancers who married men with a different profession to their own, she continued to be active in her profession after her marriage. She was commonly known as "Madame Alix".

She gave her last performance in 1798, in the opera Cora och Alonzo (Cora and Alonzo), and was granted retirement with a pension for life on condition that she continued to be active as a dancing instructor. She had been doing this for years anyway, training students to perform pantomime ballet in a similar way to that of Anne Marie Milan Desguillons, who taught students to perform children's plays, and de la Fay duly continued as an instructor after her retirement.

She died in Stockholm in 1826, aged 77.

== See also ==
- Giovanna Bassi
- Louis Gallodier
