= Sophie Hus =

French actress

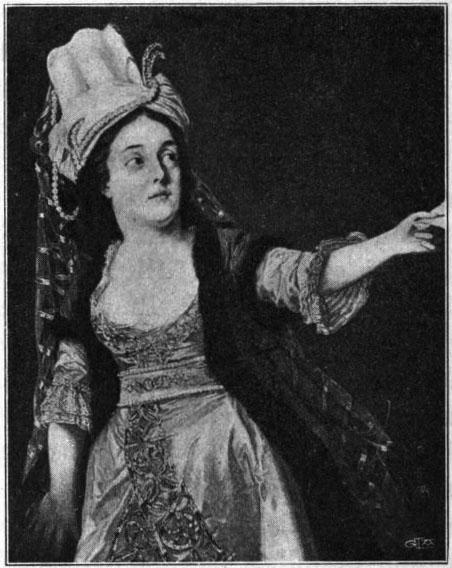
Sophie Hus

Sophie Hus, stage name for Marie-Sophie-Gabrielle Soulier, née Buguet (1758 in Toulon – after 1831, in Saint Petersburg, Russia), was a French stage actress. She was active in the French Theater of Gustav III in Sweden (1784–87), and the French theater in Russia (1787–99).

== Life ==
Sophie Hus was the daughter of Maria Buguet Soulier and Josef Buguet Soulier, a cellist at the theater of Nîmes, and half sister of the musician Jean-Pierre Soulier. In 1781, she married Eugène Hus, but the couple separated in 1783.

Sophie Hus is first noted to have performed as an actress in Lyon 1772–73. In 1784, she was engaged to perform at the French theater in Stockholm by Jacques Marie Boutet de Monvel. She made a success in Sweden, where she was regarded to be the perhaps greatest actress of the French theater, and it was said that many French actresses in Stockholm where compared to Hus long after her departure. Sophie Hus was described as foremost a tragedienne, recommended for her intense impression. She acted in tragedies such as Tancréde et Adelaide de Guesclin by Voltaire, and romantic comedies by Marivaux, Sedaine and Beaumarchais.

During her tenure in Stockholm, Sophie Hus had a relationship with the Russian ambassador to Sweden, Arkady Morkov. When he was recalled in 1786, she wished to accompany him to Russia, but was prevented from doing so because she had not yet fulfilled her term at the French theater in Sweden stipulated in her contract. In July 1786, Morkov arranged for Hus to be smuggled out from her contract in Sweden over the border by his secretary, dressed in male clothing. Hus and her maid were apprehended in Nyköping on their way out of the country and Hus was arrested for intention of breaking her contract with the theater. She demanded to be freed from her contract, and was after negotiations allowed to resign after the 1786–87 season. Her attempted escape attracted much attention, and was the subject of the Swedish comedy play Le Desertice eller Rymmerskan ('The deserter or the Ranaway'), which was published anonymously in 1786 and attributed to Carl Israel Hallman or Gustav III, in which Sophie Hus was called "M.me Superlative".

After having fulfilled the 1786–87 season Sophie Hus left Sweden for Russia, where she was engaged at the French theater in the Mikhailovsky Theatre in 1789-1799. She resumed her relationship with Arkady Morkov, with whom she had a daughter: she is noted to have accompanied him to Paris in 1801. Her year of death is not known, but assumed to have been soon after 1831, the last year in which she is mentioned alive.
