= Marie Louise Marcadet =

Swedish opera singer (1758–1804)

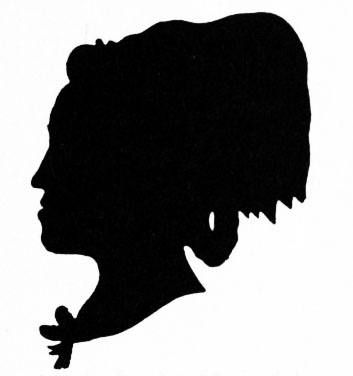
- Marie Louise Marcadet
- Born: Marie Louise Baptiste; 3 December 1758; Stockholm, Sweden
- Died: 28 February 1804 (aged 56); Paris, France
- Other name: Marie Louise Baptiste
- Spouse: Jean Remi Marcadet

Marie Louise Marcadet née Baptiste (3 December 1758 – 28 February 1804) was a Swedish opera singer and a dramatic stage actress of French origin. She was active in the Royal Swedish Opera as a singer, and in the Royal Dramatic Theatre and the French Theater of Gustav III as an actress. She was a member of the Royal Swedish Academy of Music from 1795.

== Life ==
Marie Louise Marcadet was born in Sweden as the daughter of the French actors Marie Baptiste and Jacques Anselme Baptiste. Her parents where both engaged at the French theater in Stockholm, and she was trained as a stage artists by them. The Baptiste family left Sweden in 1771, when the French theater was dissolved by Gustav III of Sweden upon his succession to the throne. She returned to Sweden with her parents in 1776, and performed with some of the French actors of the old theater, which entertained the Swedish royal court in a smaller scale, until a new French theater was established in 1781.

In 1780, she married a French dancer at the Royal Swedish Ballet, Jean-Rémy Marcadet, and was thereafter known under the name Marcadet.

=== Career ===
Marie Louise Marcadet was engaged as an opera singer at the Royal Swedish Opera in 1778-95, and as a dramatic stage actress at the French theater in 1781-92, and at the Royal Dramatic Theatre in 1788-95. She made her debut at the Royal Swedish Opera in Bollhuset in the opéra bouffon Les deux avares by Grétry in the 1777–78 season, and was later the same year acclaimed in Lucile by the same composer. She was also active as a stage actress. When a new French theater was founded in 1781, directed by Monvel, she became a part of their company until their dissolution in 1792.

She had an influential position at the opera. On the occasion of her marriage, she was given the opportunity to stage her own production as a benefit performance, which was somewhat controversial and criticized by Gustaf Johan Ehrensvärd, who noted as criticism toward the opera manager Barnekow, that she: "acted as a director of the performance, which he should have done, disposed of the loges, auctioned them off, so that prime minister riksråd Ulric Scheffer lost his loge for not being the highest bidder... it was given to a cook and a chancellor. Such indecency could not be allowed by anyone but this opera management."

She belonged to the pioneer generation of the Royal Dramatic Theatre. When the first Swedish language Ristell theater (1787–88) went bankrupt and transformed by the king to the Royal Dramatic Theatre in 1788, Marie Louise Marcadet and the other actors formed a board of directors and managed the new theater themselves. This management has been described as stormy, but Marcadet was praised for her judgement in the voting about which plays to stage in the theater. The financial arrangements and employment conditions at the royal theater illustrate that Marie Louise Marcadet and Fredrica Löf was given the highest position of all women actors there.

=== Estimation ===
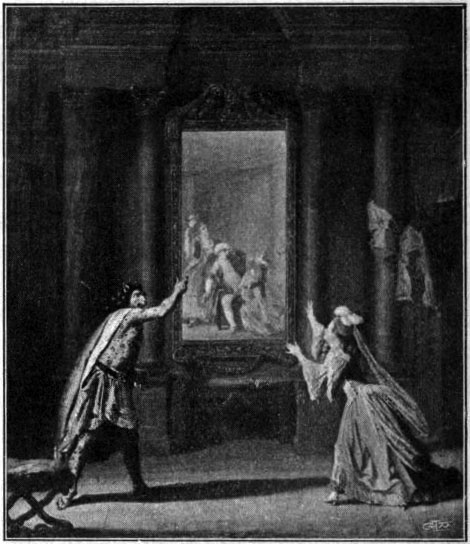
Marie Louise Marcadet in Zemir och Azor by Pehr Hilleström.

Marie Louise Marcadet performed both as an opera singer and a stage actress and was regarded as one of the most noted stage artists in Sweden during her twenty years long career. Marie Louise Marcadet, alongside Jaques Marie Boutet de Monvel, Joseph Sauze Desguillons and Anne Marie Milan Desguillons, has been credited with influence over the development which directed the newly established Swedish national theater to follow a French pattern. She was highly respected as a professional artist, and was referred to as an example of the importance of education by Carl von Fersen in his work Operans och svenska spektaklets förbättrande (1780).

Marcadet was not regarded to be beautiful and described as a very thin woman with a protruding chin to her appearance, but regarded as an competent singer and a marvelous actor. As an opera singer, she was estimated to have a moderately good voice, but handled with such skill that she functioned very well in opera, though she was never counted as belonging to the absolute elite. It was her dramatic talent as a stage actress she was given the highest praise. The critics appreciated that her hard French accent gave her speech power and energy, and she was admired for the impression of passionate strength she eluded. Johan Henric Kellgren called her acting divine, and considered her acting divine, Carl Christoffer Gjörwell wrote of her dramatic ability in the opéra comique Zémire et Azor by Grétry that "her entire soul was created for the Theater."

=== Roles ===
Among her parts was Clytaimnestra, Merope by Voltaire, Jocasta in Oedipe by Adlerbeth, Statira in Olympie by Johan Henric Kellgren, Athalie by Racine and countess Walltron in Der Graf von Walltron by Heinrich Ferdinand Möller.

She played Henriette in Les deux avares (season 1777–78), Arséne in the opera La belle Arsène by Monsigny (with Elisabeth Olin and Christoffer Christian Karsten) and Iphigenie in Iphigénie en Aulide by Gluck (with Carl Stenborg), 1779–80, Cybèle in Atys by Piccinni (with Carl Stenborg and Kristofer Kristian Karsten), 1784–85, Hermione in Andromaque by Grétry (with Franziska Stading), Cecilia av Eka in Gustaf Wasa by Johann Gottlieb Naumann (with Carl Stenborg, Kristofer Kristian Karsten and Caroline Halle-Müller), 1785–86, Ramfrid in Folke Birgersson till Ringstad by Gustav III (with Kristofer Kristian Karsten and Inga Åberg), 1792–93, and Minerva in Alcides inträde i världen (The arrival of Alcide in the world) by Haeffner, 1793–94.

=== Later life ===
She made her last performance on the Stenborg theatre 14 November 1795, in which she had expressed her wish to "receive the encouragement of the public, which she had so beneficially been granted during her career", and made "a startling success by the praise given to her from an overwhelmed audience."

After this farewell performance, Marie Louise Marcadet left Sweden for France, where she died in Paris.

== Legacy ==
Gustav Löwenhielm mentioned her importance in Swedish theater and opera history in the 19th century, during a discussion about the employment of foreign artists, when he pointed out that several of the artists during the foundation of the Royal Swedish Opera and the Royal Dramatic Theatre had been foreigners:

"Is it impossible to engage Mr Berg and Miss Schoultz? - Generally, I can not see how we can elude the employment of half grown foreigners. Gustav III's Swedish national theatre started with the Danish Mrs Müller, the French Mrs Marcadet, the German Mamsell Stading, the German Mrs Augusti and the Polish Mrs Karsten. These ladies occupied our stage and kept it from the foundation of the opera and the premature departure of Mrs Olin in the beginning of the 1780s, until the year of 1800, when the school of Mrs Desguillons had created Mamsell Wässelia cum celeris."
