= Dän Swänska Theatren =

Dän Swänska Theatren ('The Swedish Theatre') was an all-male Swedish Theatre Comedy troupe, active between 1682 and 1691: from 1686 in Stockholm. The company performed in Lejonkulan in 1686-89 and in Bollhuset in 1689–91. They were the first theater company in Sweden composed of Swedish actors and formed the first Swedish language theater in Sweden. However, they were a company formed of student actors from Uppsala University, who did not regard themselves as professional actors and who referred to their activity as temporary, which it also was. Nevertheless, they were pioneers in the history of the Swedish theater.

== Members ==
- Olaus Rudbeck the Younger
- Johan Celsius
- Isaak Börk, the director of the company
- Carl Johan Ollieqvisth
- Andreas Strömbergh
- Georg Törnqvist-Adlercreutz, actor, writer and translator
- Johan Widman
