= French Theater of Gustav III =

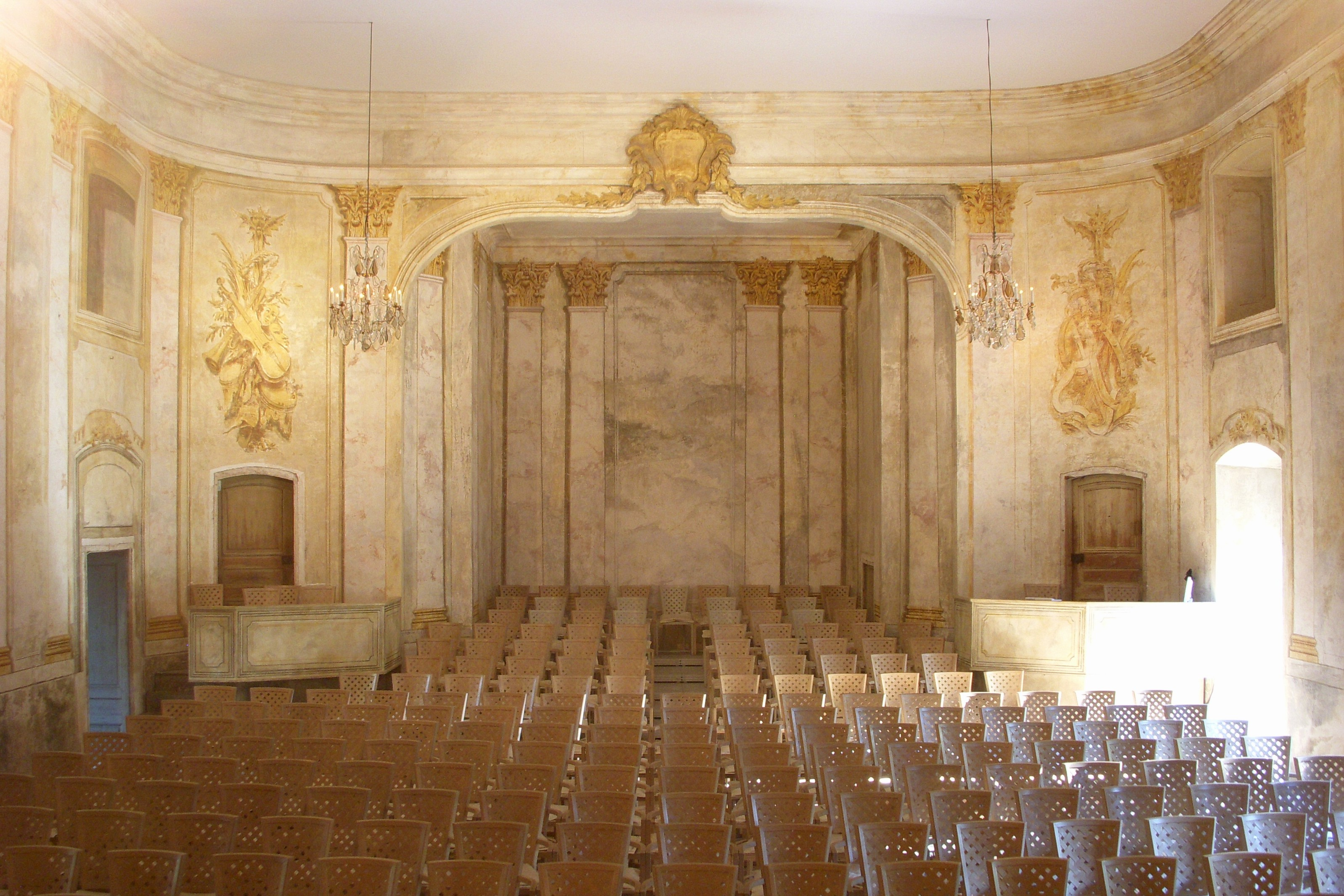
Confidencen

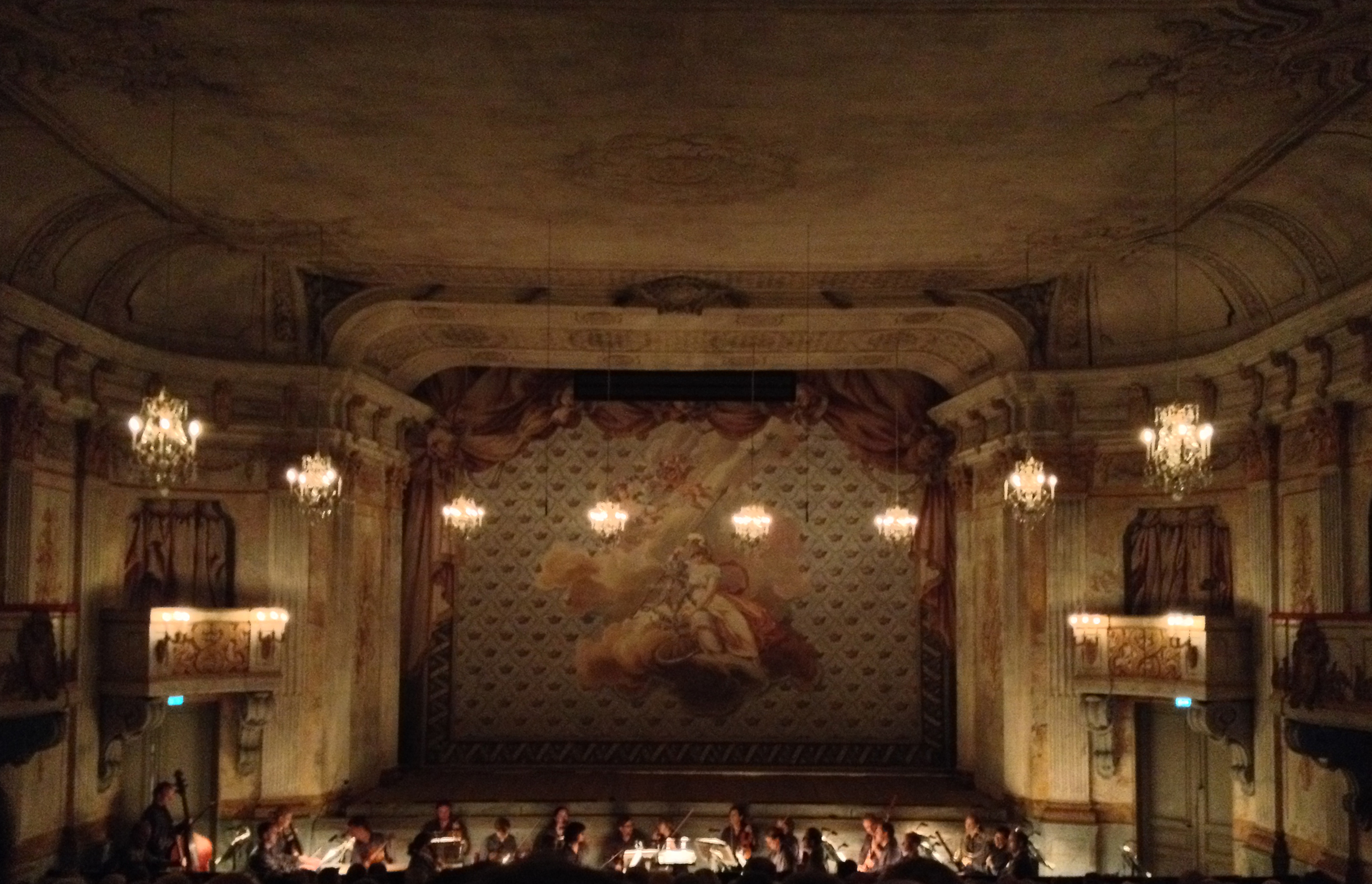
Drottningholms slottsteater, interior view

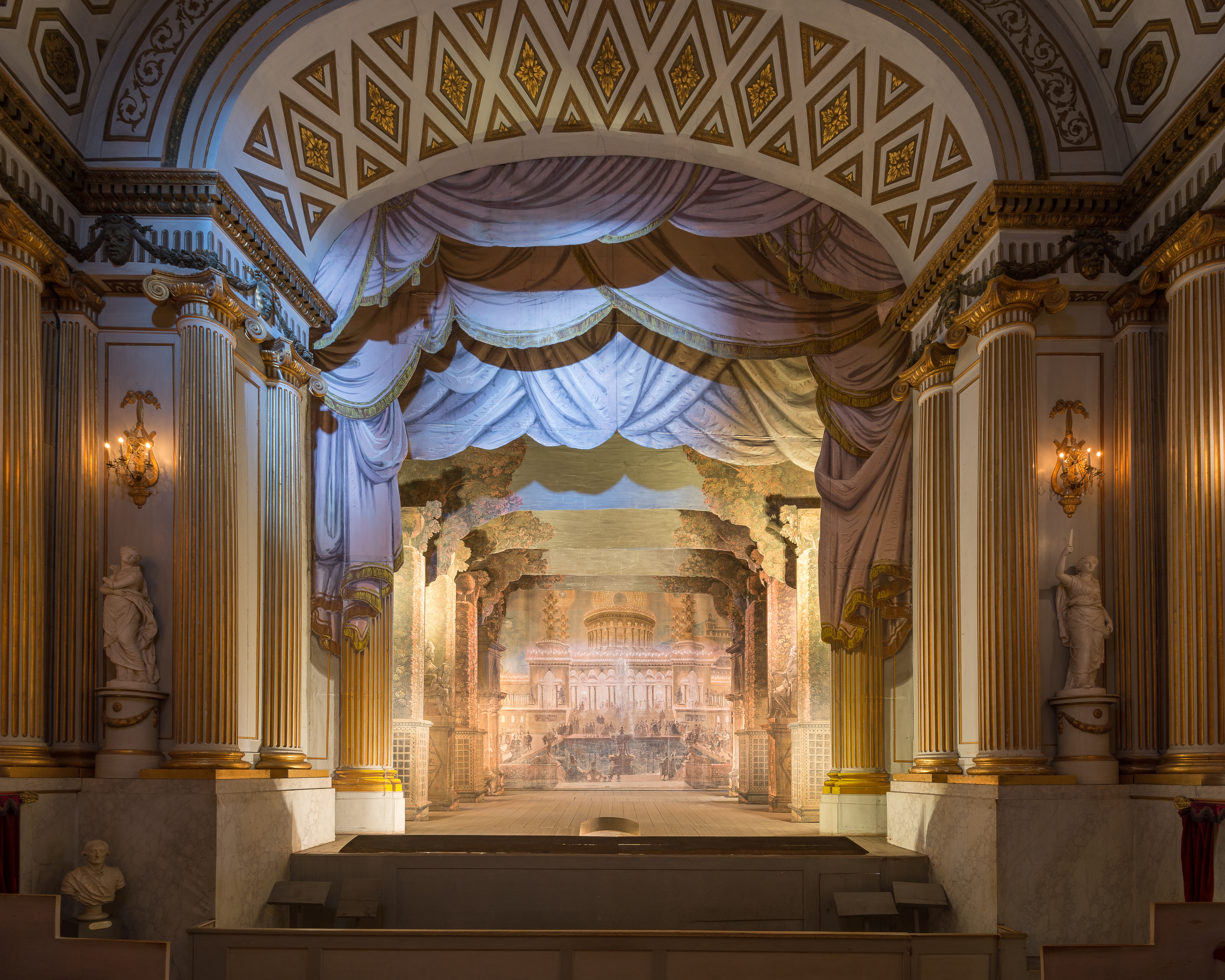
Theatre in Gripsholm Castle

The French Theater of Gustav III was a French language theater active in Sweden between 1781 and 1792. The French theater company performed both before the Swedish royal court in the theaters of the royal palaces, as well as before the Swedish public in Stockholm. It is known to have played a significant part in the education of the pioneer generation of actors at the Royal Dramatic Theatre.

The French theater was composed in Paris by Jacques Marie Boutet de Monvel in 1781, when it was engaged by king Gustav III of Sweden to perform before the Swedish royal court. Initially, they performed exclusively for the royal court in the theaters of the royal residences, such as Drottningholm Palace Theatre and Confidencen.

From 1783 onward, they also performed before the Swedish public at Bollhuset. The public performances were, in practice, normally visited exclusively by the upper classes of Stockholm, who were able to understand the French language. The French Theater appeared before the public at Bollhuset on Wednesdays and Fridays, and at the royal court whenever they were commanded to. The company were considered of high quality, and performed the latest plays from Paris.

They shared Bollhuset with the Royal Dramatic Theatre from 1788, but they performed separately and referred to as the "French Theater" and the "Swedish Theater" respectively. The actors of the French Theater were expected by the king to educate Swedish pupils, and many of the first generation of Swedish actors at the Royal Dramatic Theatre were students of the actors at the French Theater, such as Lars Hjortsberg and Fredrica Löf.

The French Theater were dissolved after the death of Gustav III in 1792.

== Members ==
Actors and singers

- Mademoiselle Baron
- Monsieur Caron
- Francois Chatillon
- Monsieur Clericourt
- Monsieur Cressent
- Monsieur Delaroche
- Madame Delaroche
- Anne Marie Milan Desguillons
- Joseph Sauze Desguillons
- Elise Du Belloi
- Monsieur Dugay
- Madame Dutillier
- Francois Marie Moussé Félix
- Madame Felix
- Adélaïde-Thérèse Feuchère
- Monsieur Feuillet
- Sophie Hus
- Jean-Rémy Marcadet
- Marie Louise Marcadet
- Sidonie de Massat
- Monsieur Michu
- Madame Montrose
- Jacques Marie Boutet de Monvel
- Catherine-Victoire Le Riche de Cléricourt - Monvel
- Monsieur Sainville
- Monsieur Saint-Ange
- Henri O. Dougherthy de la Tour eller Delatour
- Carlo Uttini
- Monsieur Versenil

Dancers

- Charles Didelot, father of Charles-Louis Didelot
- Louis Frossard
- Marie-Renée Frossard

== See also ==
- La troupe du Roi de Suede
- Du Londel Troupe
