= Elisabeth Forsselius =

Swedish opera singer

- Born: Gertrud Elisabeth Forsell; 23 January 1771; Sweden
- Died: 15 February 1850 (age 79); Sweden
- Other names: Elisabeth Haeffner, Elisabeth Fahlgren.
- Spouse(s): Johann Christian Friedrich Haeffner and Johan Jacob Fahlgren.

Gertrud Elisabeth Forsselius née Forsell, also called Forselia, later known as Elisabet Haeffner and Elisabet Fahlgren (23 January 1771 – 15 February 1850), was a Swedish stage actress and opera singer. She belonged to the pioneer generation of the Royal Dramatic Theatre.

== Life ==
Elisabeth Forsselius is believed to have been the daughter of the clerk Jacob Forssell (d. 1807) and Anna Magdalena Schylander (1778-1848). She was the sister of the opera singer Gustava Rebecka Forsselia (1772-?).

She married the composer Johann Christian Friedrich Hæffner in 1787, divorced him in 1807 and remarried the opera singer Johan Jacob Fahlgren (1786-1848), who had previously been the student of her husband and their tenant, the following year.

=== Career ===
Elisabeth Forsselius was active both as an opera singer and an actress, but she had most success as an actress.

She enrolled as a student at the Royal Swedish Opera in 1783, and continued to be active there in a minor capacity until 1810. In 1785-87, she was engaged at the Stenborg Theatre, where she made a favorable debut in a breeches role in a pastoral operetta.

In 1787, she was engaged at the Swedish language Ristell theater at Bollhuset by Adolf Fredrik Ristell. When Ristell when bankrupt and fled the country to escape his creditors the year after, the theater was transformed by king Gustav III of Sweden to Royal Dramatic Theatre, and the actors formed a board of directors, which ruled the theater until 1803. In the rapports of Armfelt, who observed the board meetings as a representative of the Royal Swedish Academy of Arts, Elisabeth Forsselius was described as irresponsible and capricious - however, these sessions where known to be stormy, and if the judgement was correct, she was far from alone in being so.

Elisabeth Forsselius was described as an excellent dramatic actress particularly within comedy. She frequently played breeches roles and soubrette roles, and her appearance allowed her to play teenage boys and girls until her last years on the stage.

Like many of her generation of actors at the Royal Dramatic Theatre, she retired after the 1810-11 season.

=== Roles ===
She played Anna in Siri Brahe och Johan Gyllenstierna by Gustav III in 1788 and 1790 and the title role of Minna von Barnhelm by Lessing in 1793. Among her other parts were Sidonie in Armide by Gluck in the season 1786–1787, Ismene in Elektra (by Hæffner) in 1787–1788, Delia in Les trois sultanes, a play by Favart in 1789–1790, Weakness in Alcides inträde i världen in 1793–1794 and Armide in Renaud (both also by Hæffner) in 1800–1801, and the marchioness in Griselda by Friedrich Halms in 1809–1810.
