= Maria Franck =

Swedish actress and drama teacher (1771–1847)

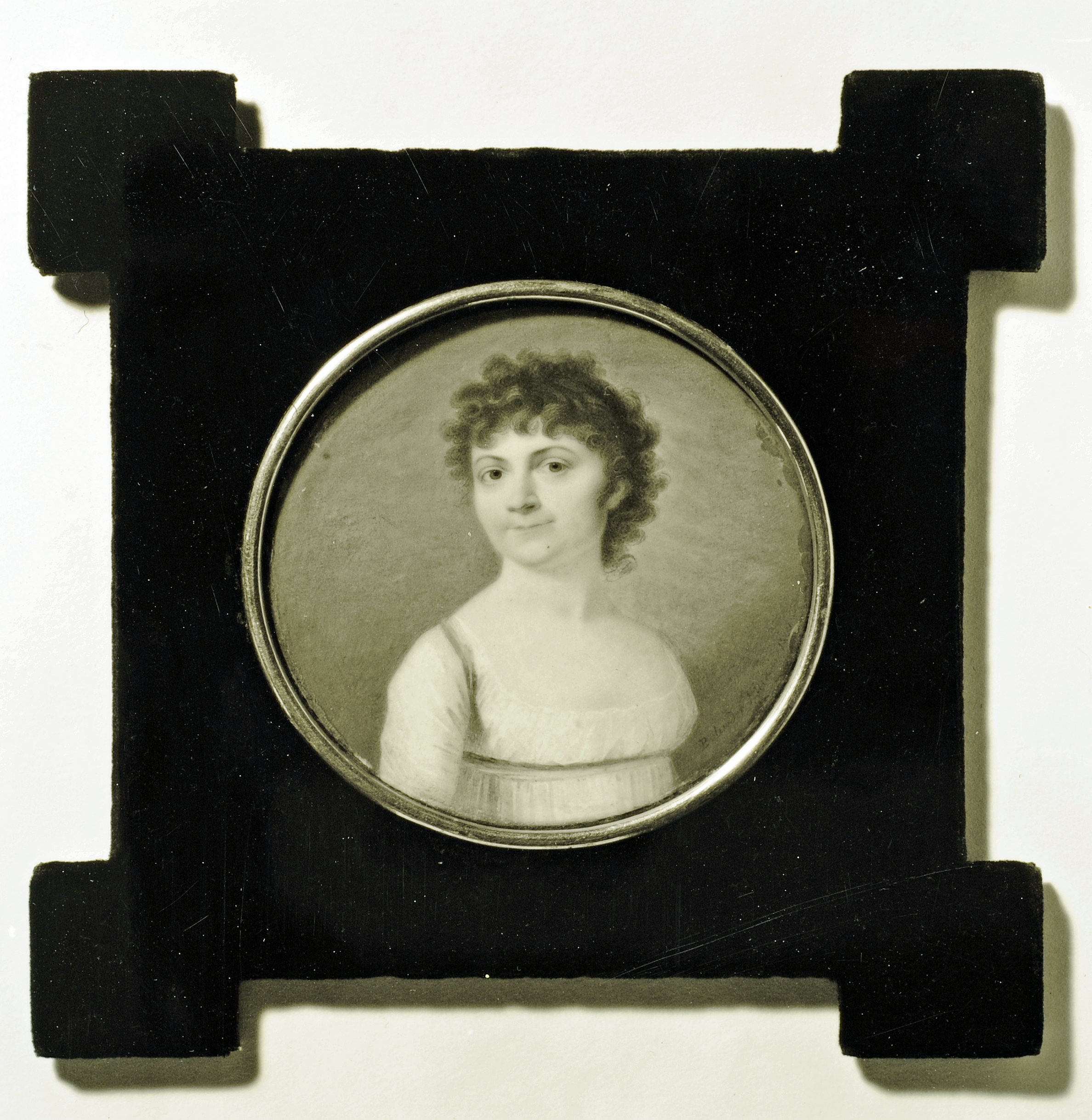
- Portrait by Johan Erik Bolinder
- Born: Maria Kristina Franck; 2 February 1771; Uppsala, Sweden
- Died: 17 April 1847 (aged 76); Stockholm, Sweden
- Other name: Kristina Ruckman (after 1808)
- Spouse: Johan Gustav Ruckman

Maria Kristina Franck (2 February 1771 – 17 April 1847) was a Swedish actress and drama teacher. She was a member of the pioneer generation of the Royal Dramatic Theatre, and belonged to the first stars of the theater. She has been referred to as her country's first native dramatic tragedienne. She was the principal of the Royal Dramatic Training Academy from 1819 to 1823. During her last years on stage, she was known under her name as married, Ruckman.

== Life ==
Maria Franck was the daughter of a bricklayer journeyman, Johan Franck, and Brita Lundström.

In 1784, she was enrolled as a student of the Royal Swedish Opera. Her mentors where Marie Louise Marcadet and Monvel, members of the French theatre. Monvel where reportedly impressed by her talent and she was trained as an actress exclusively for speaking drama and not as a singer of opera.

=== Career ===
In 1788, Maria Franck was contracted as a "First actress" of the Royal Dramatic Theatre, which was founded that year. She was as such also a member of the actors board of directors, which managed the theater until 1803.

Maria Franck achieved great success foremost as a tragedienne, and as such, she has been referred to as the most important link between her mentor, the tragedienne Marie Louise Marcadet, and the famous tragedienne of the 19th-century Swedish theater, Sara Torsslow. She did occasionally play comedy as well, and one of her most acclaimed roles was as Mrs Dorsan in Den svartsjuka hustrun ('Jealous Wife') by Desforges. She also performed an occasional minor singing part at the opera, as the staff of the Royal theaters (the Royal Swedish Opera and the Royal Dramatic Theatre) was formally available for both stages. She is known to have made occasional tours in the country. During the regency government years of Gustav IV Adolf (1792–96), she had risen to become one of the most valuable members of the Royal Dramatic Theatre, which is illustrated by the fact that her income from the theater belonged to the elite of the actresses there. Franck enjoyed great respect as an artist, and the theater director G F Åkerhjelm respectfully noted her "enlightened and experienced judgement" as well as her "excellent ability and her well deserved fame". She reportedly acted with a deep feeling and intensity, and a control over her mimic, which was never melodramatic.

Her career lasted longer than most actors of her generation: most of her generation of actors retired after the 1809–10 season, while she remained until 1818. During her last years on the stage, she was criticized for being to melodramatic in her way of acting; she acted in accordance with the French school, which had by then became unfashionable. In 1818, she retired with a full pension.

Maria Franck had, in parallel with her acting career, given lessons in declamation, and in 1819, the year following her retirement from the stage, she was engaged as the principal of the Royal Dramatic Training Academy, a position she kept until 1823. She is known as the mentor of Sara Torsslow and Charlotta Eriksson.

In 1808, at the age of thirty-nine, Maria Franck married the eleven years younger engraver Johan Gustav Ruckman (1783–1862). Some encyclopedias therefore list her as Kristina Ruckman, as this was her name during the last ten years of her career. She became the mother of the painter Maria Ruckman (1810–1896). In contrast to most actors of her generation, which often had financial problems, Maria Franck was reportedly well off during her retirement, although this may have been in part because of her husband, who was a successful engraver.

=== Roles ===
Among her parts were "One of the pleasures" in Armide by Gluck (season 1786–87), Maria in Gustaf Adolf och Ebba Brahe (Gustaf Adolf and Ebba Brahe) by Gustav III (1787–88), Flattery in Alcides inträde i världen (The arrival of Alcide in to the world) by Haeffner (1793–94), Theodora in De gamla friarna (The old suitors) by Dalayrac (1795–96), Antiope in Renaud by Haeffner (1800–01), Sabina in Den förmente prinsen (The supposed Prince) (1807–08), Madame de Veronne in Ambroise (1812–13), Gertrud in Den Schweiziska familjen (The Swiss family) (1815–16) and the abbess in Nunnorna (The nuns).

Her most noted performances was Thilda in Oden, Celestina and the Abess in Korsfararne (Crusaders) by Kotzebue, and the leading parts in Virginia by Paykull, Johanna af Montfaucon by Kotzebue and Mrs Dorsan in Den svartsjuka hustrun (The jealous wife); the latest one (1808) was considered to be her greatest triumph.
