= Louise Götz =

Swedish actress

Louise Götz (1772 – unknown) was a Swedish stage actress. She was active during the early years of the Royal Dramatic Theatre.

She was the daughter of Louis Götz, a wig maker employed by the Royal Swedish Opera. She married Gabriel Saint-Remy, a servant of the royal court, and was known as Louise Saint-Remy until their divorce, after which she resumed the name Götz.

Like many actors associated with the early Royal Dramatic Theatre, Götz began her career at the theatre of Adolf Fredrik Ristell, founded in 1787. When Ristell's theatre became bankrupt, its company was incorporated into the newly established Royal Dramatic Theatre in 1788.

Contemporary accounts describe Götz as particularly successful in soubrette and breeches role performances. She was among the theatre's higher-paid performers during this period.

In 1803, King Gustav IV Adolf of Sweden engaged a French theatre company to perform in Stockholm. According to contemporary sources, Götz later married a member of that company and left Sweden with the troupe in 1805.
