= Johann Christian Friedrich Hæffner =

German-born Swedish composer

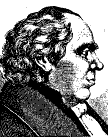

Background information
- Born: March 2, 1759
- Origin: Germany
- Died: May 28, 1833 (aged 74)
- Occupation: Composer

Johann Christian Friedrich Hæffner (2 March 1759 in Oberschönau – 28 May 1833 in Uppsala) was a German-born Swedish composer.

Hæffner received his first musical education with the Schmalkalden organist Johann Gottfried Vierling. He studied in Leipzig from 1776, and then worked as a music conductor in theatres in Frankfurt am Main and Hamburg from 1778 to 1780. He moved to Stockholm, Sweden in 1781 at the invitation of the German congregation there (Tyska kyrkan) to assume the position of organist, which he held until 1793. The same year (1781) he was employed at the Royal Theatre in Stockholm as well as conductor of the orchestra for the Stenborg theatres. In 1786 Hæffner was appointed assistant conductor of the Royal Orchestra (hovkapellet) and from 1795 to 1807 he held the post of hovkapellmästare (Chief conductor of the Royal Orchestra). He was also an instructor at the Royal Dramatic Training Academy. He was married twice, first to the Swedish actress and singer Elisabeth Forsselius.

Since King Gustaf IV Adolf closed the Royal Opera (and its orchestra) in 1807, Hæffner moved to Uppsala, where in 1808 he was appointed Director musices of the university and simultaneously was employed as organist of the cathedral. In Uppsala he organized the studentsång ("Student singing") - four-voice male choir singing. This practice rapidly spread to the other Nordic universities and is still today a coveted tradition, not only among university students, but for the last century also in many (most ?) male choirs all over Sweden. Hæffner's passion and work for this has procured for him the name Studentsångens fader ("Father of 'studentsång'). The starting point of this tradition is usually set to a performance of Under Svea banér (words by P.D.A. Atterbom, music by Hæffner) by a student choir celebrating the war hero Klingspor on 24 October 1808.

Hæffner composed three operas, theatre music, a mass, songs with piano accompaniment, and was responsible for the new Swedish chorale book in 1819. Noteworthy is his oratorio Försonaren på Golgatha ("The Saviour on Golgatha").

Hæffner died in Uppsala on 28 May 1833.

== Works ==
- Den svartsjuke sin egen rival, eller Sängkammareko (The Jealous is his own Rival, or Bed Chamber Echo), theatre music, 1784
- Electra, opera, Swedish libretto by Adolf Fredrik Ristell after Nicolas François Guillard, 1787
- Alcides' inträde i världen, Opera in one act, Swedish libretto by Abraham Niclas Clewberg-Edelcrantz 1793
- Renaud, Opera, Swedish libretto by N. B. Sparrschöld after Torquato Tasso 1801
- Arias for Äfventyraren by Johan Magnus Lannerstjerna and for Eremiten by August von Kotzebue

== Sources ==
- Nordisk Familjebok 1909
