= Confidencen =

Theatre in Solna, Sweden

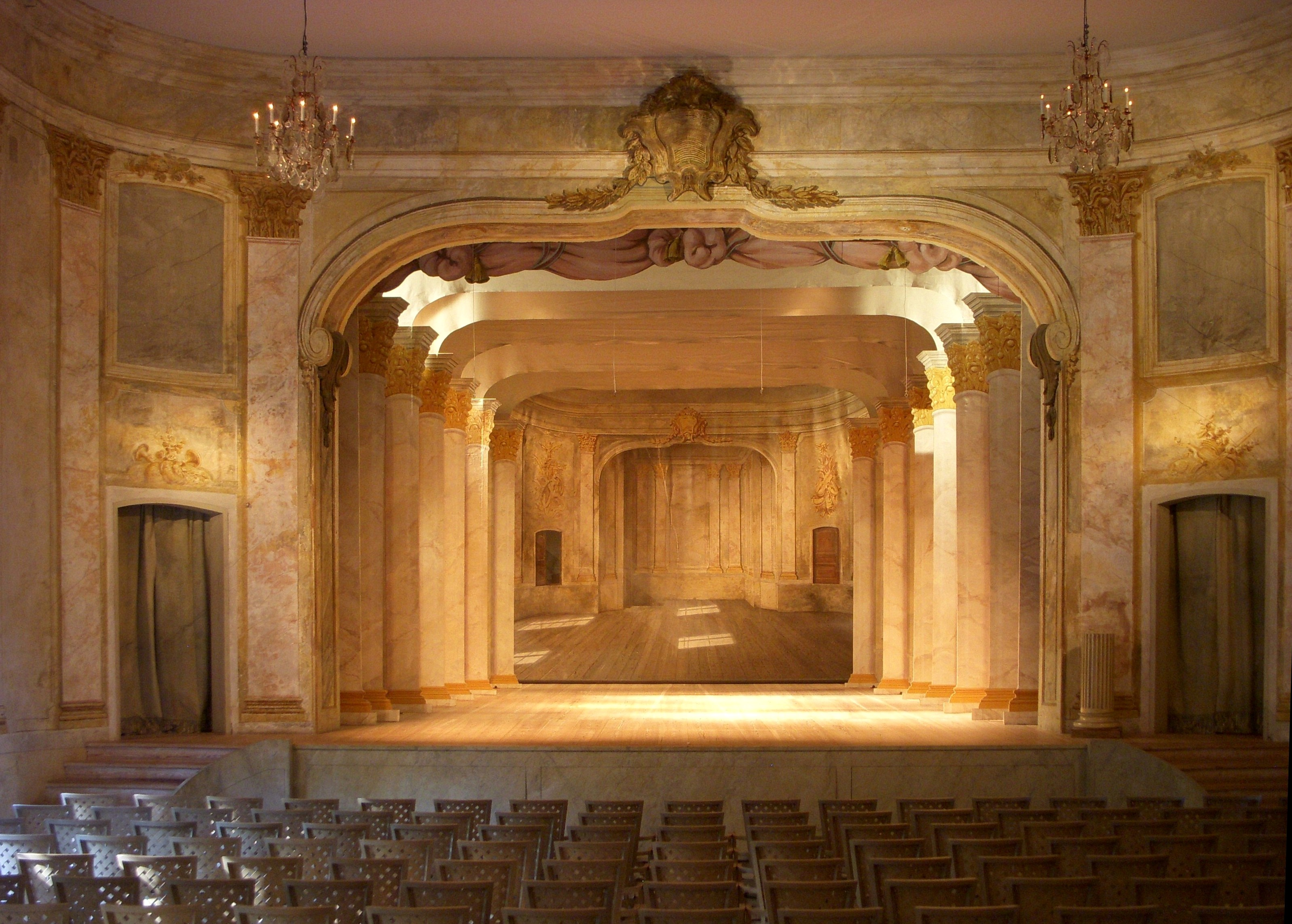
- Auditorium and stage of Confidencen
- Interactive map of Confidencen
- Location: Ulriksdal Palace, Solna, Sweden
- Coordinates: 59°23′10.65″N 18°1′2.35″E
- Event: Theatre

Construction
- Built: 1750s
- Opened: 1753

Confidencen, or Ulriksdal Palace Theatre (Swedish: Ulriksdals slottsteater), is a theatre in the park of Ulriksdal Palace in Solna, in the Swedish capital Stockholm. Built in the 1750s and restored from the late 20th century, it is the oldest Rococo theatre in Sweden.

== History and design ==
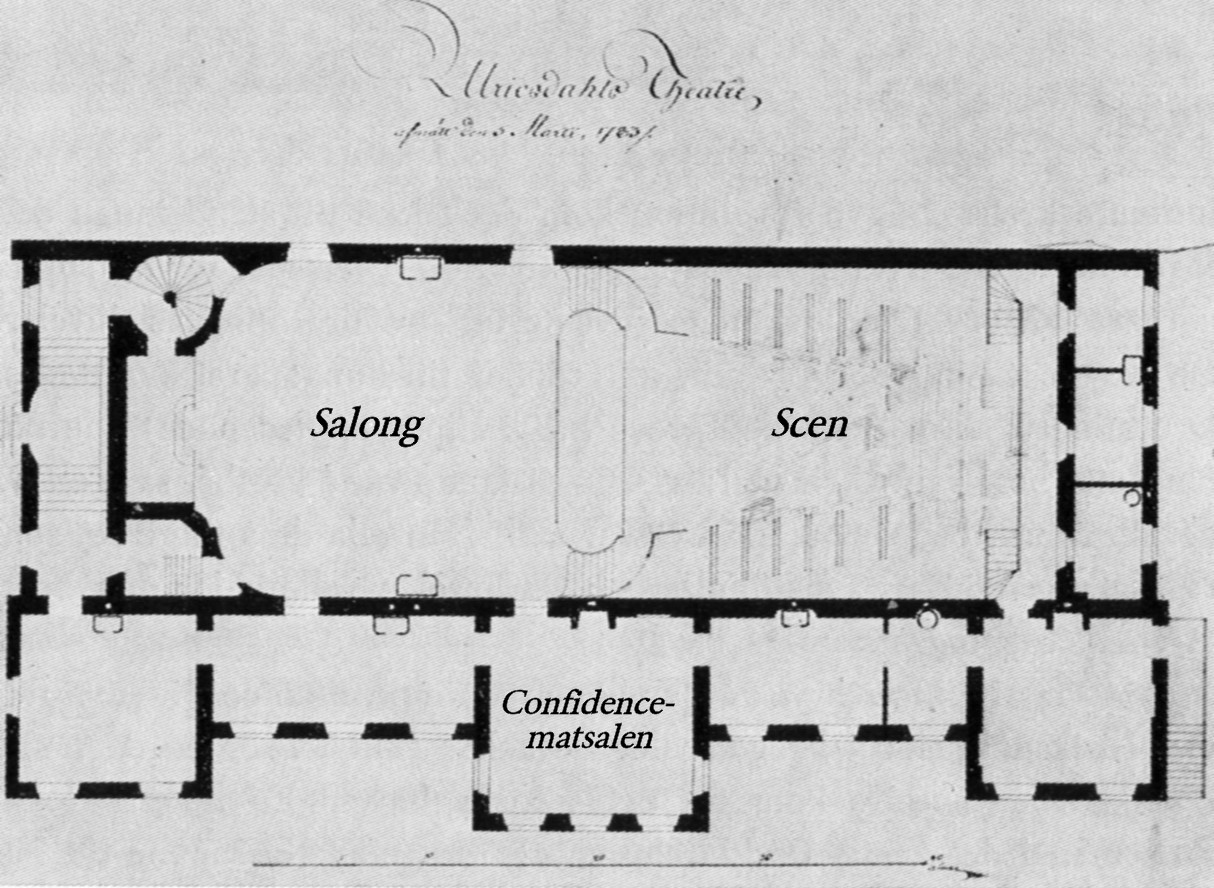
A floor plan of the theatre dated 1783 with indication of rooms superimposed. Salong = auditorium; Scen = stage; Confidencematsalen = The "Confidence Room"

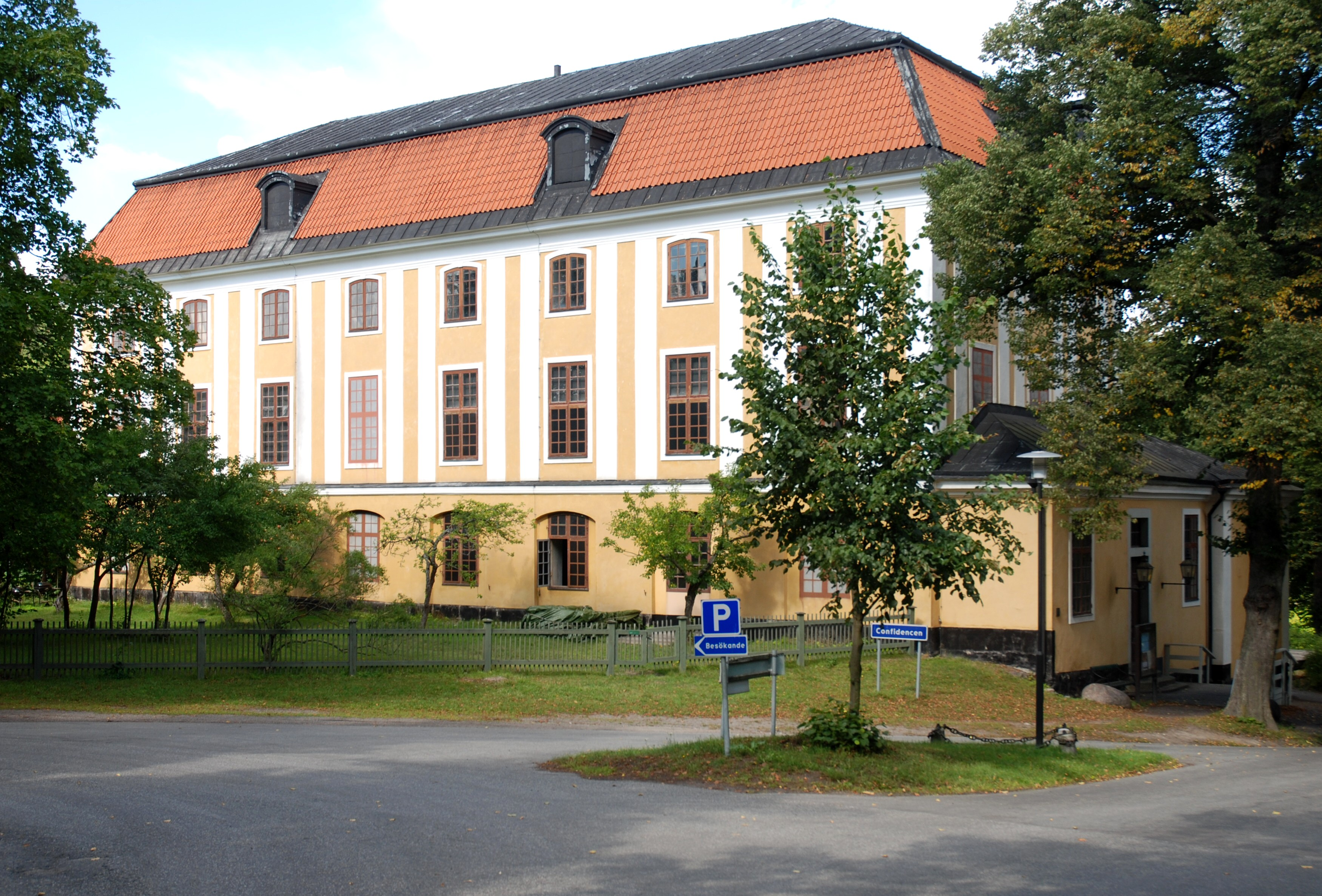
Exterior and main entrance at the gable

The history of the theatre goes back to the 1750s, making it the oldest Rococo theatre in Sweden. In 1751, Louisa Ulrika of Prussia was crowned Queen of Sweden after her marriage to King Adolf Frederick. Ulriksdal Palace was given to her as a gift, and it was at her initiative that the theatre was constructed, inspired by other European palace theatres. For this purpose an already existing building was used, built in the 1670s as a stable and also housing a tavern. A new facade had at that time just been constructed for the building to designs by Carl Hårleman. It is also probably Hårleman who was originally contracted with designing the theatre, but when Hårleman died in 1753 architect Carl Fredrik Adelcrantz was instead commissioned with creating the theatre within the premises of the building. It seems that the construction was carried out with haste in order to have it finished in time for the arrival of a French theatre troupe. He created an intimate theatre room in the large, rectangular room of the former stables. Its layout and decoration are in the style of French Rococo. The rooms of the former tavern were converted into reception rooms with comparatively restrained decorations, and above these the dressing rooms for the actors were located. The reception rooms were equipped with cocklestoves and decorated with silken wallpapers, parquetry floors and decorations made by Johan Pasch. The largest of the reception rooms were more elaborately decorated, notably in a form of Rococo which displays German influences rather than French, and exhibits a number of features not known from any other works by Adelcrantz, indicating that the queen (who was of German origin) may have been personally involved in its design. This room, the so-called "Confidence room", was intended to be used by the royal family as a dining room and lounge area in connection with performances at the theatre, and was equipped with a so-called table à confidence, a table which could be mechanically lowered into a room below. In this way, the family could avoid having servants in the room while they were there and thus speak to each other in confidence - hence the name. Similar rooms exist elsewhere in Europe and also in one of the side pavilions of the Chinese Pavilion at Drottningholm. The plain walls of the auditorium were painted as to imitate colossal pilasters, architraves and cartouches. It was heated by one or possibly two cocklestoves; one of them may have been a dummy.

The new theatre was finished in 1753. The aforementioned French theatre troupe is known to have visited the theatre that same year. The theatre took its name after the unusual table à confidence and it could originally accommodate 200 people.

The theatre was used extensively during the 18th century. Carl Michael Bellman is alleged to have attended the theatre. During the reign of Gustav III, two galleries were added in the auditorium. The play Helmfelt, written by the king himself, was staged here and the play Tillfället gör tjuven by Carl Israel Hallman premiered here in 1782.

The theatre fell into disuse after the assassination of Gustav III in 1792. In the 1860s, the machinery for the scenery was dismantled. Reconstruction works for the auditorium were also started with the aim of transforming it into a hunting lodge for Charles XV to designs in a Renaissance Revival style. The work was aborted with the death of the king in 1872, but the room had already been significantly altered by then. It went on to serve multiple different uses including a school classroom, a military barracks and a telegraphic station. Attention was turned to the disused theatre in 1920 in connection with the re-opening of the similar Drottningholm Palace Theatre. In 1935 it was declared a protected cultural heritage and an association was formed in 1965 with the aim of restoring the theatre.

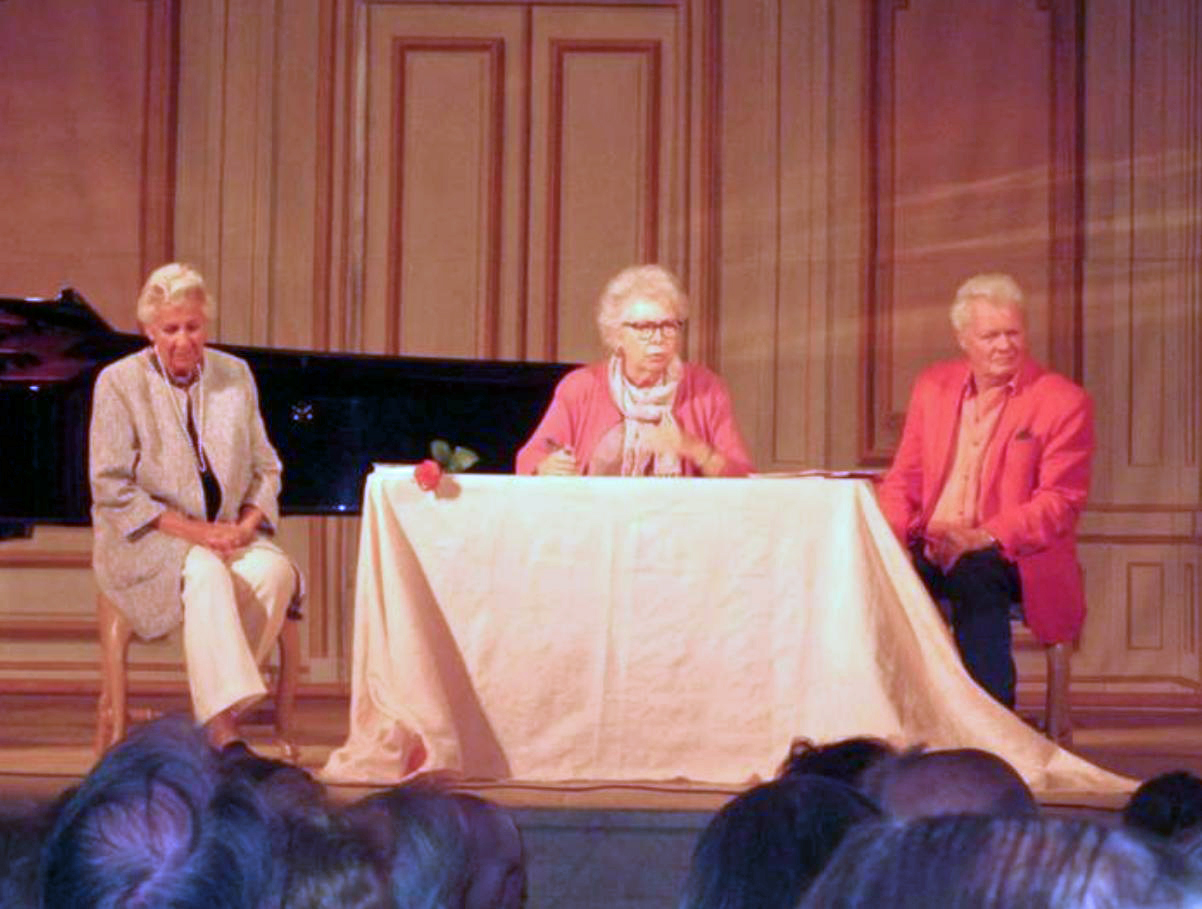
Chairman Christina Magnuson, with Dellert and her husband ballet master Nils-Åke Häggbom, presides over the 2016 annual membership meeting of the theatre's friendship society

In 1976 Kjerstin Dellert became engaged in restoring and managing the theatre and since then worked to gather support for its restoration, which has taken place gradually. The Confidence room and the table à confidence were restored in 1994-1997 and the scene and the machinery were restored in 2003-2004 after comparisons with the 18th-century palace theatres at Drottningholm Palace and Gripsholm Castle as well as with the help of the original blueprints and designs. While reconstructing the historical machinery and keeping the historical ambiance, the lighting system was modernised and other practical changes made in order to make the backstage more comfortable and user-friendly. The work was carried out with the help of private donations, sponsorship and volunteer work. Kjerstin Dellert managed the theatre until her death in 2018.

== Contemporary use ==
The theatre building is used during the summer to host concerts, theatre performances and operas; live candles are used as illumination of the auditorium. In addition, guided tours are given of the premises when there is no performance. It is part of the European Route of Historic Theatres.

== Location ==
Confidencen is part of the Ulriksdal Palace park, one of the official residences of the Swedish Royal Family. It lies within the Royal National City Park.
