= Wendla Åberg =

Swedish actress and dancer (1791–1864)

Wendla Åberg (1791–1864), was a Swedish stage actress and ballet dancer. She was a star attraction of the Gothenburg theatre and one of the most celebrated stage actors outside of the provincial theatre in her time.

Wendla Åberg was the daughter of the opera singer Inga Åberg and the nobleman Carl Gustaf von Stockenström. She was engaged at the Comediehuset in Gothenburg in 1812–16, and then at its successor stage of Segerlindska teatern in 1816–23; first under Johan Anton Lindqvist and (from 1820) under Gustaf Åbergsson. She was a star attraction of the theatre during the period in which Gothenburg had a permanent theatre, the only one outside of Stockholm.

Åberg was not only a stage actor, but also a trained dancer. As such she provided dance when ballet was offered by the theatre, and highly respected for this art. She was equally popular as an actor, and considered to be one of the three most distinguished women of the Swedeish provincial theatre of her time:

... one can say that our stage has never, at least not for quite some time, possessed such skillfull actresses as Mrs Åbergsson and the mamsell's Haglund and Åberg;

In 1823, the Gothenburg Theatre was dissolved as a permanent stage and Åberg was engaged at the theatre company of Carl Wildner. Wendla Åberg discontinued her stage career in 1825, and settled in Gothenburg with her mother, where she became a dance instructor. She was very successful in this regard and became a famous local profile of her time: for forty years, she instructed the high society debutants of Gothenburg prior to their social debut ball.
