= 1787 in Sweden =

- Years in Sweden: 1784 1785 1786 1787 1788 1789 1790
- Centuries: 17th century · 18th century · 19th century
- Decades: 1750s 1760s 1770s 1780s 1790s 1800s 1810s
- Years: 1784 1785 1786 1787 1788 1789 1790

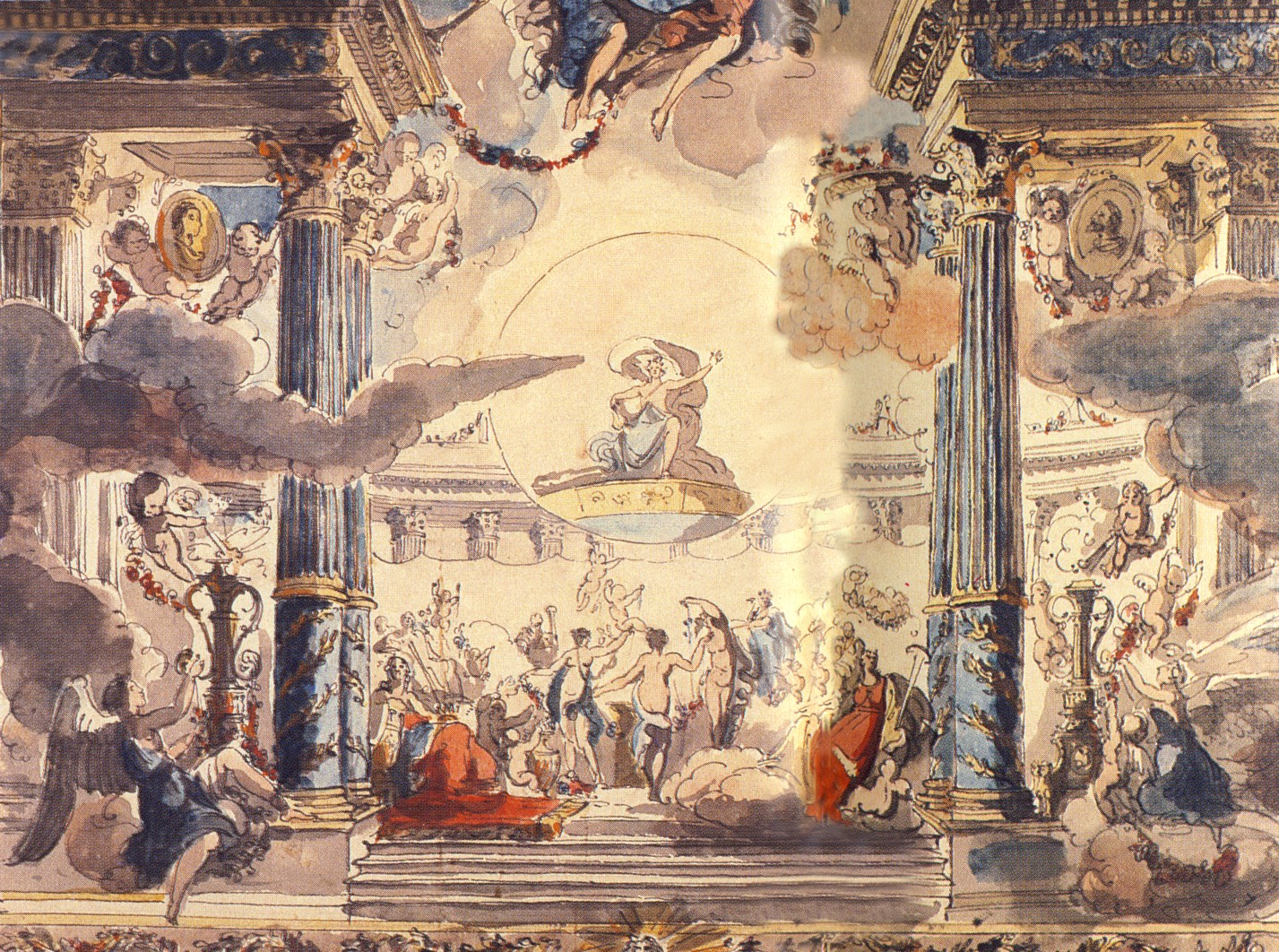
Stora Bollhuset

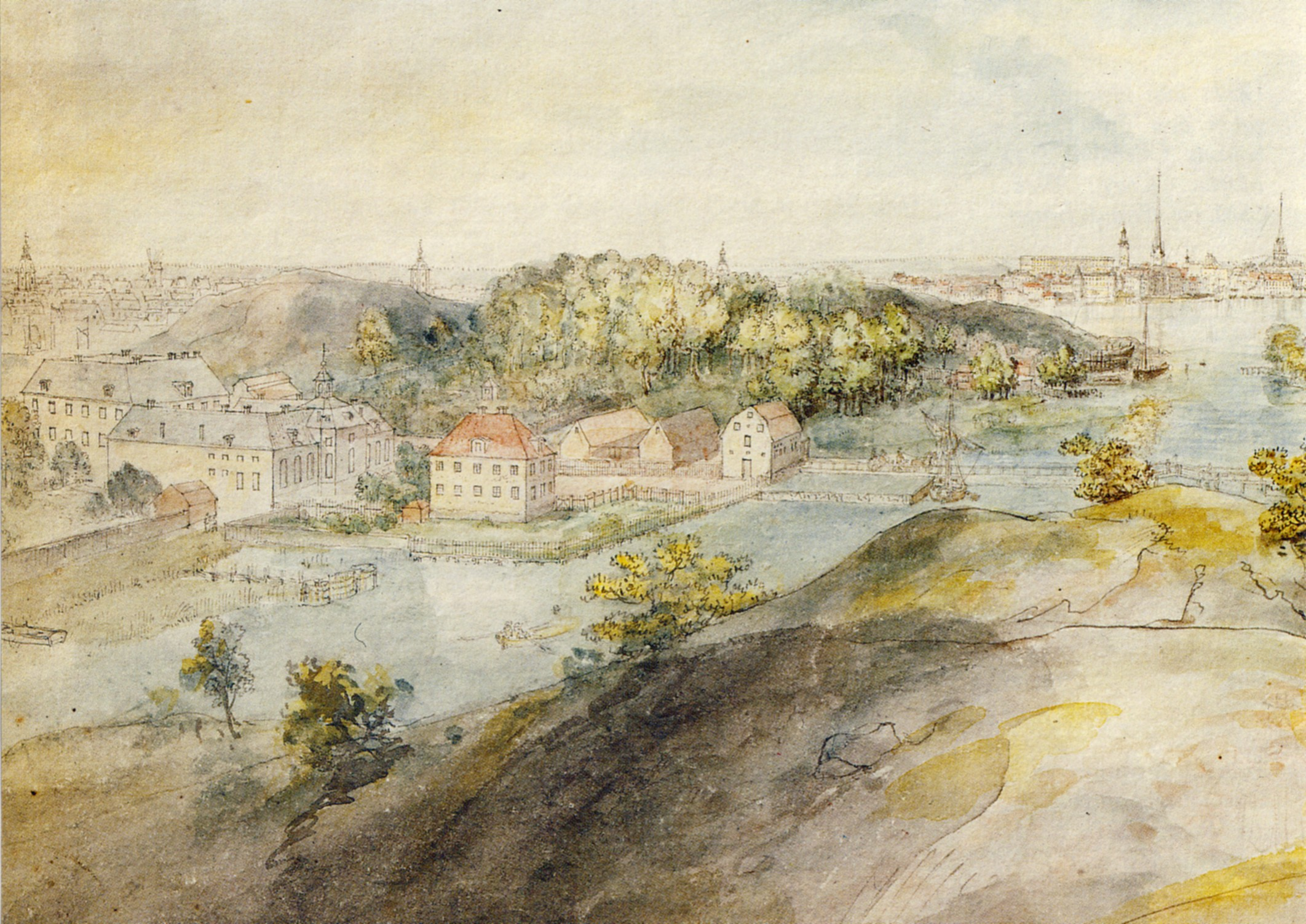
Långholmen 1787, Elias Martin

Events from the year 1787 in Sweden

== Incumbents ==
- Monarch – Gustav III

== Events ==
- 24 January – Hamlet is played for the first time in Sweden by Andreas Widerberg at the Comediehuset in Gothenburg.
- A private Swedish language theater are founded in Bollhuset in Stockholm by Adolf Fredrik Ristell.
- The Royal Dramatic Training Academy is founded.
- The art of circus is introduced for the first time in Sweden through the Price Circus Company of Rosalia Price, Peter Price (1761-1790) and James Price (1761-1805), who tour Sweden.

== Births ==
- 22 February – Erik Djurström, stage actor (died 1841)
- 26 April – Elisabet Charlotta Piper, court official (died 1860)
- 4 December – Johan Fredrik Berwald, violinist, conductor and composer (died 1861)
- Catharina Torenberg, violinist (died 1866)

== Deaths ==
- Agatha Lovisa de la Myle, poet (born 1724)
