= Sophie Haglund =

Swedish stage actress

Sophie Haglund (fl. 1830), was a Swedish stage actress. She was the star attraction of the Gothenburg theatre and one of the most celebrated stage actors outside of the capital of Stockholm in her time.

Her background is not known, which was not uncommon for actors of the time. Sophie Haglund was engaged at the Comediehuset in Gothenburg in 1810-16, and then, when it was replaced, at the new theatre of Segerlindska teatern in 1816-23; first under Johan Anton Lindqvist and (from 1820) under Gustaf Åbergsson. She was a star attraction of the theatre during the period in which Gothenburg had a permanent theatre, the only one outside of Stockholm.

Among her roles where the title role of Louise och Wallborn by Lafontaine, Marianne in Tartuffe by Molière, the title role in Hittebarnet by Castelli, Margareta Kurl in Schiller's Mary Stuart, Rose in En natt i skogen by Dalayrac, and Jules d'Harancourt in Abbé de l'Epée.

Haglund was generally given good reviews. After her role in Hittebarnet, it was said:

Having seen her acting in this play, as well as that of Korsfararne, one can say that our stage has never, at least not for quite some time, possessed such skillfull actresses as Mrs Åbergsson and the mamsell's Haglund and Åberg;

Haglund was highly regarded particularly for her ability within tragedy, which was at that time given the highest status among the genres of acting:

...she is our only tragedienne, which was clearly demonstrated in »Korsfararne» and »Hittebarnet». She owns the youthful weakness, the mild grace, the tender, almost melancholic expression, which belonged to the tragic actress.

In 1823, the Gothenburg Theatre was dissolved as a permanent stage and Sophie Haglund was engaged at the theatre company of Carl Wildner. As such she is noted to have performed at her old stage in Gothenburg again in 1830, when the city was visited by the Wildner company.
