= Inga Åberg =

Swedish actress and opera singer (1773–1837)

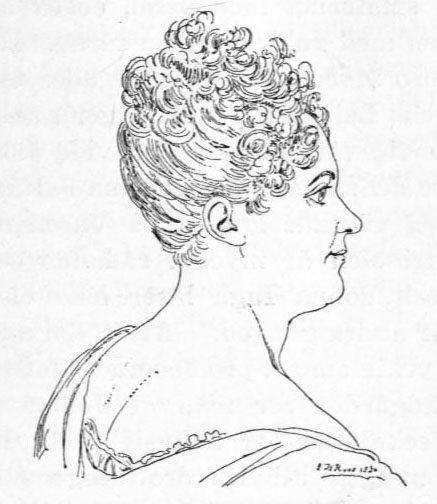
- Born: Ingeborg Elisabeth Åberg; 1773; Stockholm, Sweden
- Died: 1837 (aged c. 64 ) Sweden

Inga Åberg (Ingeborg Elisabeth; 1773–1837) was a Swedish actress and opera singer. She was engaged as an opera singer at the Royal Swedish Opera, and as a stage actress at the Royal Dramatic Theatre, between 1787 and 1810.

== Life ==
=== Early life ===
Inga Åberg was the daughter of Jonas Åberg, a footman at the Royal Palace and Fredrika Maria Svahn. It is likely that her paternal grandmother was Beata Sabina Straas, the first professional native stage actress: Straas had been employed as a chambermaid of the royal household prior to her stage career, and after she married Anders Åberg and retired from the stage, both she and her spouse was employed in the royal household, but it is not confirmed that Jonas Åberg was their son.

Both Inga and her brother Gustav Åbergsson where described as beautiful and placed as students in the French Theater of Gustav III, where she was enrolled from 1781 to 1787. Many later famed Swedish of stage artists of her generation was trained by the French actors of the French Theatre in Bollhuset under Monvel, among them Maria Franck, Lars Hjortsberg, and as such, they also performed as child actors in the productions.

=== Career at the Royal theatres ===
Inga Åberg debuted as an opera singer at the age of fourteen on 31 May 1787 at the Royal Swedish Opera in the role of Yngve in Frigga. Her following performance in Gustav Adolf and Ebba Brahe by King Gustav III of Sweden, she was favorably noted by the King (also the author of the play) and formally engaged at the opera.

The same year, she was in parallel engaged as a stage actress at the newly founded Swedish-language Ristell Theatre in Bollhuset. When the Ristell theater was transformed to become the Royal Dramatic Theatre (1788), she became a member of its pioneer generation. It was not uncommon in the late 18th century for stage artists to be employed at both the opera as singers and at the theater as stage actors, providing that they had the ability to perform in both capacities.

Inga Åberg was referred to as one of the more noted stage artists of her generation in Sweden. As an opera singer, she was later given the recognition of being the only native female opera singer of any note between the retirement of Elisabeth Olin in 1784 and the breakthrough of Jeanette Wässelius in 1800, when the opera stars where mainly of foreign origin, such as Caroline Müller, Franziska Stading and Sophie Stebnowska. A critic stated that she "completely acquire the character of the person she plays", and she was praised for her versatility, her "energy and finesse", her grace and her "seductive gracefullness." In the first decade of the 19th century, she was one of few actors of her generation which was not deemed as outdated by the harsh critic Klas Livijn.

Her beauty attracted great attention, but was also regarded to have had a negative effect on her career. According to critics, she did have great natural talent, but neglected to develop it fully because she had been told that her beauty would be enough, and therefore never reached her full potential. A contemporary writer stated that Inga Åberg: "... would have become a great singer and an excellent actress, if her unusual beauty and not been an obstacle for her artistic studies, and she had been enticed to regard it as a source of income, richer but in the long term no more secure than art." She was often used in ornamental roles, widely reputed to be a courtesan and was later referred to as a bad role model for aspiring female actors and singers. Her brother and colleague Gustav Åbergsson, himself known for his beauty and often used in the part of lover, changed his name from Åberg to Åbergsson to avoid any connection to "his notorious sister's name."

=== Roles ===
Inga Åberg and Euphrosyne Löf were among the first named Swedish actresses at the Royal Opera to play breeches roles when they had the two leading male parts in August and Theodor eller De bägge kammarpagerna (August and Theodor or The Two Valets), by Kexel inspired by a French theatre comedy, in the 1794–95 season. She made a success in Olof Åhlström's Tanddoktorn (The Dentist) with Lars Hjortsberg in 1800, and played the leading part in the opera Le calife de Bagdad by Boieldieu with her brother Gustav Åbergsson and Jeanette Wässelius in 1806. In 1796, she played opposite famous singers such as Christoffer Christian Karsten, Caroline Halle-Müller, Louis Deland and Carl Stenborg in the opera La caravane du Caire by Grétry, which was held to celebrate that the young king had been declared of legal majority. In 1810, she launched the opera buffa Markis Tulipano (Marquess Tulipano) by Gourbillon translated by Carl Magnus Envallsson with music by Giovanni Paisiello, in her benefit performance at the Opera.

Among her other parts were "a spirit" in Armide by Gluck and Yngve in Frigga by Gustav III composed by Olof Åhlström (season 1786–87), Carl in Folke Birgersson till Ringstad (Folke Birgersson of Ringstad) by Kexel after a work by Monvel (1792–93), Carl Sjöcrona in Det farliga förtroendet (The dangerous trust) by Grétry (1793–94), Gustafva in De gamla friarna (The old/two suitors) by Dalayrac (1795–96), Agarenne in Panurge dans l'île des lanternes by Grétry (1799–1800), and Madame de Brillon in Monsieur Des Chalumeaux by Pierre Gaveaux (1807–08).

=== Later life ===
Inga Åberg was the subject of a great scandal when the merchant millionaire Hall from Gothenburg, one of the richest men in Sweden, placed his teenage son John Hall under her tutelage with the task of correcting his behavior by instructing him in "the way of the world". This arrangement was considered very peculiar by contemporary society and attracted great notorious attention. Inga Åberg accepted the offer: she gave Hall large bills to pay during the time when his son was in her care, which Hall, far from opposing, instead considered as proof of the high quality care she gave his son. She then left Sweden and her career at the opera for Saint Petersburg in Russia with her young pupil John Hall. John Hall eventually returned to Sweden alone and referred to Åberg as "a cunning adventuress".

After her return to Sweden from Russia and her retirement from the Royal Swedish Opera and the Royal Dramatic Theatre, Inga Åberg was active in various travelling theater companies touring Sweden and Finland. Among them where the theater company of her brother. In 1816–17, she and her daughter are noted to have been members of is noted to have been a member of the Johan Anton Lindqvist theater company, where she was still given good critic as a tragedienne and described as having a "Fresh and jolly nature". In 1825, she is noted to have performed the part of Elizabeth opposite Maria Sylvan in Mary Stuart by Schiller in Åbo in Finland. She spent her last years with her daughter in Gothenburg, where she gave dance lessons to the children of the city burgher upper class.

Inga Åberg never married but had a daughter, Wendla Åberg, with the nobleman and courtier Carl Gustaf von Stockenström. Her daughter was educated in dancing and was a star dancer of the Gothenburg theater Comediehuset and the foremost fashionable dancing instructor of the city well in to the 1850s.
