= Anna Catharina Widerberg =

Swedish actress and singer

Anna Catharina Widerberg née Widebäck or Widebeck (1765-1824), was a Swedish stage actress and singer.

She was engaged at the Comediehuset in Gothenburg, which was the only permanent theater stage in 18th-century Sweden outside of the capital of Stockholm, in 1782-90.

She was a star actor and alongside Andreas Widerberg one of the theater's main attractions. Not just an actress but also a singer, it was reportedly she and Andreas Widerberg which made it possible for the director Johan von Blanc to stage opera at the theater, otherwise at that point only possible in Stockholm. In 1783, she and Andreas Widerberg starred in the French operetta Annette et Lubin by Jean-François Marmontel, which introduced opera at the Gothenburg stage with great success, and the same season, Anna Catharina and Andreas Widerberg announced their engagement in the press to the audience with a poem, in which it was stated that the income from the performance had been granted them as a wedding gift.

In 1790, Anna Catharina Widerberg accompanied her spouse to Stockholm after he had been engaged there at the Royal Dramatic Theatre, but does not seem to have been active as an actor herself after this. The couple divorced in 1806. She was the mother of several children, most notably Henriette Widerberg.
