= Haglund =

Haglund is a Swedish surname. Notable people with the surname include:

- A. J. Haglund (born 1983), American football player
- Carl Haglund, Finnish politician
- Carl Haglund (real estate), American landlord and real estate developer
- Dean Haglund, Canadian actor
- Hallie Haglund, American comedian
- Ivar Haglund (1905–1985), American folk singer and founder of Ivar's seafood restaurant in Seattle
- Karl Haglund, Swedish track and field athlete
- Kerstin Haglund, Swedish orienteering competitor
- Kirsten Haglund (born 1988), Miss America winner
- Lars Haglund, Swedish discus thrower
- Linda Haglund, Swedish Olympic sprinter
- Maria Haglund, Swedish sprint canoer
- Philip Haglund, Swedish footballer
- Sophie Haglund, Swedish actress
- Tommie Haglund (born 1959), Swedish composer

== See also ==
- Haglund's deformity, bony enlargement on the back of the heel
- Hägglund (disambiguation)
