= Margaretha Christina Åbergsson =

Swedish ballet dancer

Margaretha Christina Åbergsson (née Hallongren; died autumn 1810), was a Swedish ballet dancer. She was regarded as one of the elite members of the Royal Swedish Ballet in 1790–1810.

She became a student of Giovanna Bassi at the Royal Swedish Ballet in 1785, made her debut as a solo dancer in 1790, was made second dancer in 1795 and premier dancer (ballerina) from 1804.

She belonged to the elite of her profession and was described as "an excellent dancer" and "a particularly eminent artist of her department [...] Her features where perhaps not entirely regular, but graceful by the youthful cheerfulness, which animated them."

Among her performances was the ballet Venus och Adonis by Louis Deland with H. Björkman, Ludovico Casagli, Giovanni Battista Ambrosiani and Hedda Hjortsberg the 1801–02 season. In 1799, she performed in the ballet of the opera performance Panurge dans l'île des lanternes by André Ernest Modeste Grétry, translated by Johan David Valerius with music by Federico Nadi Terrade, which as performed in honor of the birth of the heir to the throne.

She married the actor Gustav Åbergsson in 1793, with whom she had several children. She reportedly died at Schönberg near Hamburg, after a long period of chest pains.
