= Euphrosyne Löf =

Swedish actor and ballerina

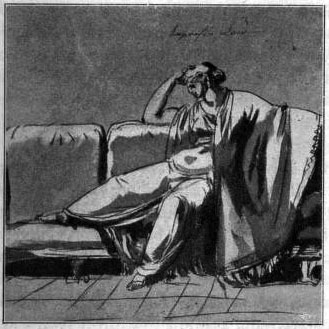
039-Eufrosyne Löf-Svenska teatern 2

Euphrosyne (Euphrosina) Löf (Stockholm, 1772 – Stockholm, 1 July 1828) was a Swedish ballet dancer and stage actress, best known for her affair with Prince Frederick Adolf of Sweden from 1795 to 1800, after his relationship with Sophie Hagman. Euphrosyne Löf acted as his hostess at Tullgarn.

== Life ==
She was the daughter of a servant at the royal court, the taffeltäckare Johan Gottfrid Löf, and Catharina Charlotta Stålhammar, and the sister of the actress Fredrique Löwen. Like her seven sisters, she was early known as a part of the Stockholm demi-monde of high class prostitutes

=== Stage career ===
Euphrosyne made a successful stage debut on the Royal Dramatic Theatre in 1791, and she also took part in ballets at the Opera. She was among the first Swedish actresses known by name to have performed in breeches role; in 1794, she and Inga Åberg did the two male leading parts of August and Theodor in the play De begge kammarpagerna (The Two Valets) by Kexel. For comparison, the first confirmed time a Swedish male actor played a female part was Kjell Waltman as Mother Bobi in 1781, though the all-male student troupe of 1686–1691 must have performed female parts as well. She appeared in Gustav III's plays, in Iphigénie by Gluck, as Märta Banér and as Ebba Brahe in Gustav Adolf och Ebba Brahe (1794) by Gustav III.

=== Royal mistress ===
In 1793, she became the mistress of Prince Charles, at that point regent during the minority of his nephew. Löf was believed to have influence on his decision to ban coffee, and when he banned silk for the public, she was mentioned in political debate: "In Stockholm it was widely said, that as long as the mamselle's Löf and Slottsberg (the duke's mistresses) wore silk and all sorts of finery, such things should not be banned" She became the lover of Prince Frederick Adolf after his relationship with Sophie Hagman ended in 1795. She was not liked and described as nasty, a "harlot who sold herself to anyone", who showed no gratitude toward all the gifts she was given and who is said to infected Frederick with venereal diseases and the relationship was criticized within the court who considered Löf "unworthy".

In 1800, Frederick ended the relationship because of her reportedly "bad behavior" and the opposition against it and granted her a pension until she entered into a new official relationship Apparently, Frederick ended the relationship because Löf had acquired an additional lover.

=== Later life ===
Euphrosyne Löf is reported to have lived a comfortable life in Stockholm until her death, and was during the 1820s observed wearing fashionable clothes. She left her fortune in her will to three of her sisters, Baroness Lovisa von Stedink, Sara "in Russia" and Sophia "in Södertälje", but it was still confiscated by the official Carl Wilhelm Broberg.
