= Ulrika Åberg =

Swedish ballerina

Ulrika Åberg (1771–1852) was a Swedish ballerina. She was active in the Royal Swedish Ballet in 1782–95. She was one of the first native ballet dancers in the Royal Swedish Ballet.

== Life ==
Ulrika Åberg was engaged as a Coryfé in the Royal Swedish Ballet in 1782–85, as a second dancer in 1785–87, and as a premier ballerina in 1787–95.

She was a student of the star ballerina of the Gustavian ballet, the Italian ballerina Giovanna Bassi, from the age of twelve. She was educated in the Italian style of ballet dancing by Bassi, and followed her mentor in her style and parts. She was considered as one of her country's first native ballet dancers.

Her most popular part was in the ballet Tillfälle för Tjuven, where she made a success. Among her other well known parts were Lise in La Rosére de Salency by Jean Marcadet with Giovanna Bassi, Anna Sofia Lind, Antoine Bournonville and Joseph Saint-Fauraux Raimond the season of 1786–87, and Mirza in Mirza och Lindor by Maximilian Gardel with Carlo Caspare Simone Uttini, Louis Deland and Jean Marcadet (1792–93).

In 1795, Ulrika Åberg married and retired from the stage, only one year after her mentor Giovanna Bassi had done the same. She is mentioned as one of the first professional Swedish dancers. In practice, native professional dancers where active already at the Bollhuset theater in 1738, but she was one of the first Swedish ballet dancers educated and active in the Swedish Royal Ballet.
