= Hedda Hjortsberg =

Swedish ballerina (1777-1867)

- Born: Hedvig Katarina Hjortsberg; 15 June 1777; Stockholm, Sweden
- Died: 3 October 1867 (aged 90); Västerås, Sweden
- Other name: Hedda Koersner
- Spouse(s): Erik Samuel Koersner, Abraham Abrahamsson Hülphers

Hedvig "Hedda" Katarina Hjortsberg also known as Hedda Koersner (15 June 1777 – 3 October 1867) was a Swedish ballerina who starred for the Royal Swedish Ballet. She was the sister of the Swedish actor Lars Hjortsberg.

== Life ==
Hedda Hjortsberg was one of six children to the stonemason Laurentius "Lars" Hjortsberg and the opera singer Maria Lovisa Schützer. Of their six children, four where employed at the Royal Swedish Opera or the Royal Dramatic Theatre, and two became famous: Lars Hjortsberg as an actor, and Hedda Hjortsberg as a ballerina.

=== Career ===
Hedda Hjortsberg was enrolled as a pupil of the French ballet master Louis Gallodier of the Royal Swedish Ballet at the Royal Swedish Opera in 1786, at the age of nine.

She made her official debut at the Royal Swedish Opera in the season of 1790–91, in the part of Lucile in the pantomime ballet Det dubbla giftermålet by Jean-Rémy Marcadet starring Margaretha Christina Hallongren, Carl Dahlén, Joseph Saint-Fauraux Raimond and Carlo Caspare Simone Uttini.

She was engaged as a premier ballerina in the Royal Swedish Ballet between 1791 and 1806, and was by her retirement referred to as "The most excellent dancer of the Swedish stage." The writer Marianne Ehrenström called her the delightful darling of the audience, and describe her as gracious as a nymph: "une taille de nymphe, pétrie de graces, Terpsicore soulovée par les Zephirs."

In 1804, she married businessman Erik Samuel Koersner, but was widowed soon after. In 1806, the Royal Swedish Opera was (temporarily) closed and remained so for three years. When it was reopened in the season of 1809–10, Hedda Hjortsberg performed with her five-year-old daughter in the ballet Dansvurmen on its inauguration. She also performed the part of Honor in Gustavs dröm.

In 1811, she married the mine manager Abraham Abrahamsson Hülphers (1777–1839) in 1811, and after that, she performed only as a guest artist.

=== Roles ===
She danced the parts of Lucile in the pantomime ballet Det dubbla giftermålet by Jean Marcadet with Margaretha Christina Hallongren, Carl Dahlén, Joseph Saint-Fauraux Raimond and Carlo Uttini the season of 1790–91, Leonore in Enleveringen by Louis Deland with him, Hallongren, Uttini, Luigi Taglioni and Charles Jean Ambrosiani and Diana in Diana och Kärleken by Deland with Johan Fredrik Björkstrand, Deland, Hallongren, Casagli and Hedvig Elisabeth Casagli in 1800–01; she also did the part of Venus in Venus och Adonis by Deland with H. Björkman, Casagli, Giovanni Battitsta Ambrosiani and Hallongren 1801–02, and as Frosine in Dansvurmen (Dance Craze) by Gardel with Deland, Filippo Taglioni, Anna Christina Löfborg, Anders Ekholm, Raimond and Ambrosiani the season 1803–04.
