= Jean Sandberg =

Swedish actor (1852–1917)

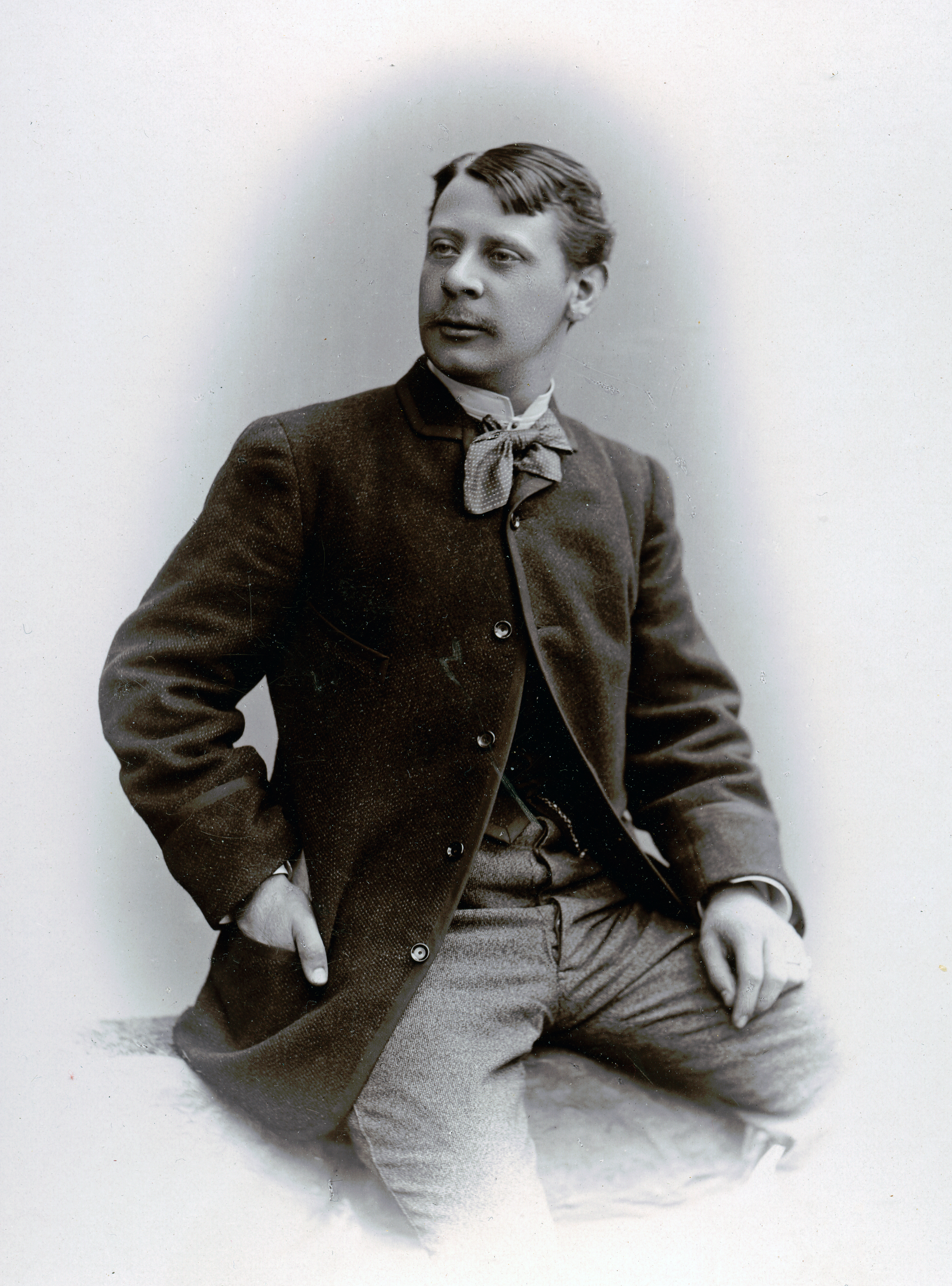
- Born: 4 August 1852; Stockholm, Sweden
- Died: 5 December 1917 (aged 65)
- Occupations: Actor; artist

Jean Sandberg (4 August 1852 in Stockholm – 5 December 1917) was a Swedish actor and artist.

Sandberg worked at Stora teatern for about ten years. He had roles in plays like Föreningsfesten, Visitlådan, Sköna Helena and Nya garnisonen. During the 1890s he worked at the Albert Ranfts theaters until he retired in May 1897.

Sandber was also an artist.
