= Lovisa Simson =

Lovisa Concordia Simson, née Kliecnik or Lindström (1746 – 26 February 1808), was a Swedish theater director. She was the managing director of the theater Comediehuset in Gothenburg between 1787 and 1792. She was the first female theater director over a permanent theater (rather than a travelling theater company) in her country.

== Biography ==
Lovisa Simson's background is unknown. Lovisa Simson was married to Johan Gustaf Simson (1756–1787), who succeeded Johan von Blanc as managing director of the Comediehuset in Gothenburg 1786–87. They had had two children.

Johan Ludvig Simson worked as a violinist and as conductor at opera performances. He performed at Sillgatan at Västra Nordstaden in Gothenburg. Johan Ludvig Simson died in November 1787, only 34 years old. When her husband died, she took over his post and managed the finances and administration of the theater, while she left the artistic work and the supervision to the actors Andreas Widerberg (until 1788) and Johan Petersson. Dramas, operas and comedies were performed. When she retired in 1792, the grand day of the theater was regarded to be over as it lost a permanent staff and was only used by travelling companies. She died during 1808 in Gothenburg.

== Other sources ==
- Forser Tomas, Heed Sven Åke, red (2007). Ny svensk teaterhistoria. 1, Teater före 1800. Hedemora: Gidlund. Libris 10415996. ISBN 978-91-7844-739-8
- Levertin, Oscar (1920). Samlade skrifter. D. 17, Teater och drama under Gustaf III : litteraturhistorisk studie (4. uppl.). Stockholm: Bonnier. Libris 284702
