= Frederick of Sweden (disambiguation) =

Frederick of Sweden - ; Swedish also: Fredrik - may refer to:

- Frederick, King of Sweden 1720
- Frederick, Prince of Sweden 1685, son of King Carl XI (died in infancy)
- Frederick Adolph, Prince of Sweden 1750
- Adolph Frederick, King of Sweden 1751
