= Sophie Hagman =

Swedish ballerina and official royal mistress (1758–1826)

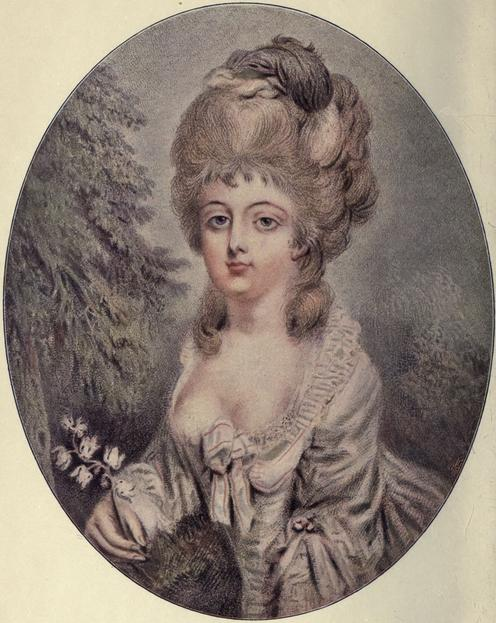
- Hagman, circa 1780s
- Born: 31 December 1758; Eskilstuna
- Died: 8 May 1826 (aged 67); Stockholm, Sweden
- Other names: Anna Stina Hagman
- Occupation: Ballet dancer
- Children: Sophia Frederica

Notes
- Royal mistress

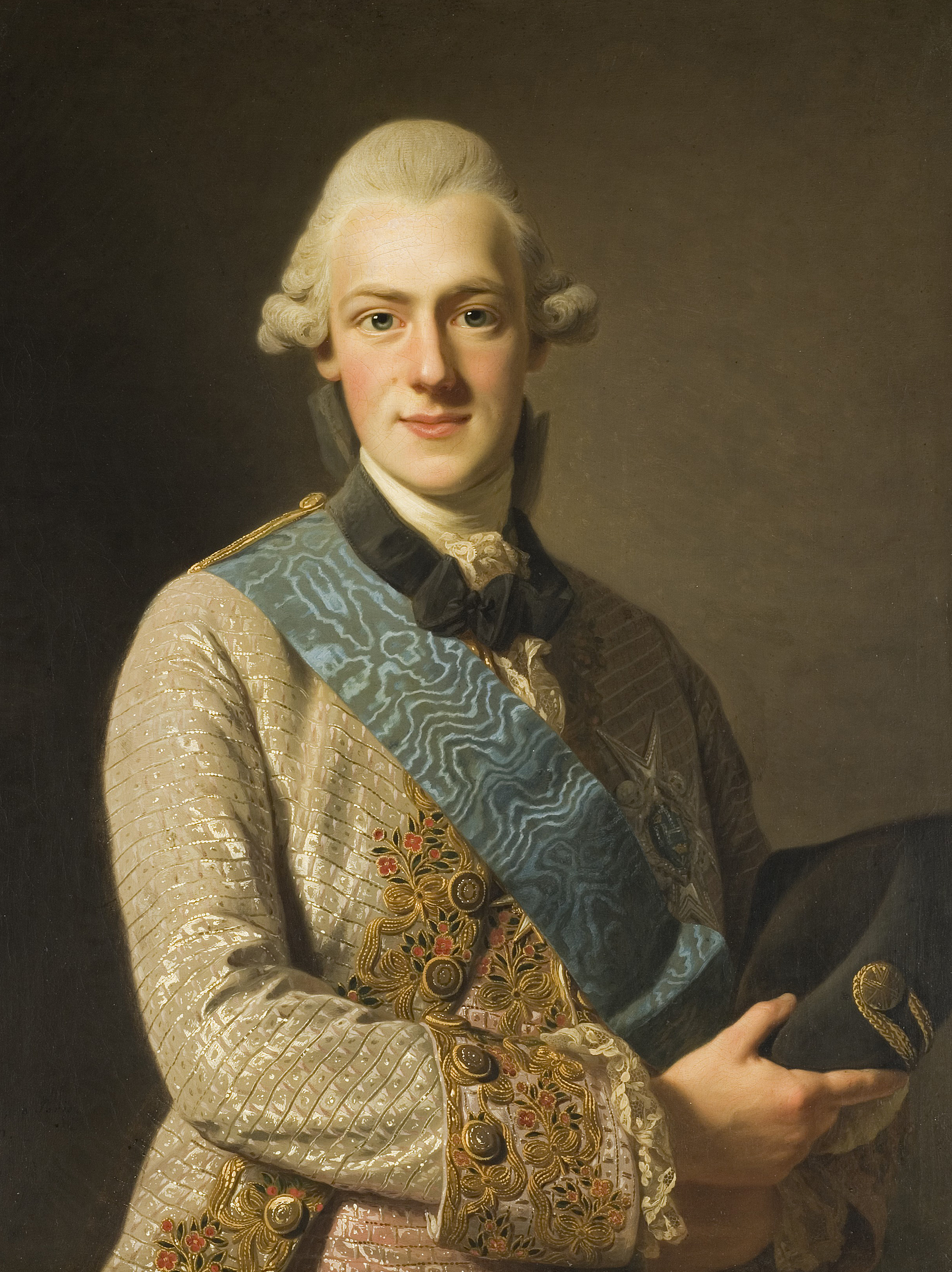
Prince Frederick Adolph of Sweden, lover of Sophie Hagman from 1778 to 1793.

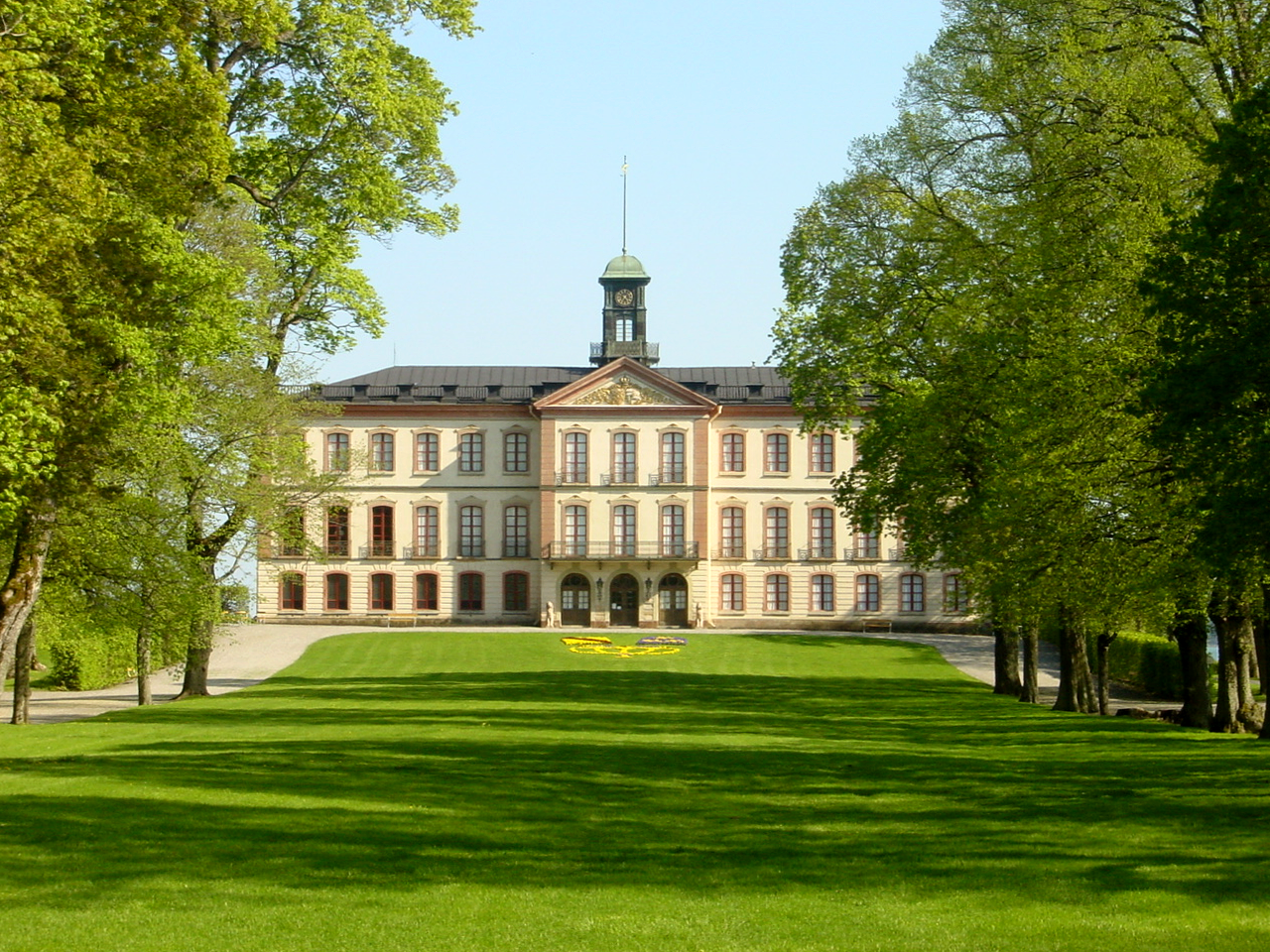
Tullgarn Palace, where Sophie Hagman lived with Frederick Adolf from 1778 to 1793.

Anna Sophia "Sophie" Hagman, née Anna Kristina "Stina" Hagman (31 December 1758, in Eskilstuna, Södermanland, Sweden – 6 May 1826, in Stockholm, Sweden), was a Swedish ballet dancer. She was the official royal mistress to Prince Frederick Adolf of Sweden from 1778 to 1793.

== Early life ==
Sophie Hagman was born in Eskilstuna as the daughter of the carpenter Peter Hagman (d. 1772) and Elisabet Hedman (d. 1767). She had two sisters, Christina Catharina and Elisabeth, and at least one brother, Carl Peter Hagman. She may have had another brother: in 1780, Prince Frederick expressed his intention to do something for the soldier Lars Hagman from Strängnäs, who was active in the Södermanland Regiment and previously unknown to him, probably because he was the brother of Sophie Hagman, and it was the custom for soldiers to serve in the same regiment as their fathers.

Her brother-in-law, Anders Erling, was a carpenter in Stockholm. In 1762, she moved to Lovön in Stockholm with her family. After the death of her father in 1772, she was employed to look after the children of Louis Gallodier, dance master of the Royal Swedish Ballet at the Royal Swedish Opera in Stockholm. She was then the maid to the lady-in-waiting Baroness Charlotte Manderström and later served as the maid to lady-in-waiting Hedvig Catharina Piper. During her employment with Piper, according to courtier count Lars von Engeström, she was "a little girl, and everyone laughed at her because she was in love with Duke Frederik." She ended her employment at Piper and entered into a relationship with a young merchant, and brewer, who supported her financially and paid for her education at a sewing school. The Austrian ambassador to Sweden, count Joseph Kaunitz, offered money to both Hagman herself and to her lover to have her for himself, but both her lover and Hagman herself refused because they were mutually in love with each other and because "the brewer was more of a beautiful man than the count." The relationship ended because the man died, and Hagman was forced to end her education to a seamstress. The dates for these events are not clear.

From 1775, Sophie Hagman had a position as a dancer in the Royal Ballet. She never became very known as a ballet dancer and was said to have been more noted for her appearance than her talent; in 1776, she is briefly mentioned as one of the shepherdesses in a ballet. In 1778, Prince Frederick Adolf noticed her during her performance as a pageboy, and after having seduced her, he became genuinely in love with her. The year after, 1779, she is no longer recorded as employed in the ballet and are noted to be living with Frederick.

== Introduction at court ==
After becoming the mistress of Prince Frederick Adolf, Sophie Hagman was said to have studied French and etiquette. She was also given the name Sophie instead of the more common Anna Stina. On 2 January 1780, she was presented at the royal court at Gripsholm Castle as the official lover of Frederick Adolf by permission of king Gustav III of Sweden. It is likely that Gustav III gave his permission because of his admiration for the French court, where official mistresses were common. The informal presentation was unique, attracted a lot of attention and is related in great detail by courtier Gustaf Johan Ehrensvärd:

Duke Frederick had negotiated for permission from His Majesty to present Mamsell Hagman for the Crown Prince. His Majesty duly agreed to this, as it seemed, starting point for future privileges for her. Everything must happen according to a certain pattern at court. So did this. The Duke had instructed Count Leijonstedt to escort her from his apartments to that of the Crown Prince, where they Duke was already present, and announced to Countess Rosen that he had been given the permission of His Majesty to have her presented to the Crown Prince. When Leijonstedt announced himself as the escort of this beauty, the Duke himself left the room, received her and escorted her into the room of the Crown Prince, stepped forward and performed a presentation. Mamsell Hagman kissed his hand and started to converse the ladies, to whom she was also presented. Her conversation was relaxed and pleasant; she displayed much modesty and respect but no shyness or submission. The Duke did not sit, making it necessary for the ladies to remain standing, so that his Mamsell would not have to remain the only one standing. It would not have been possible for her to sit down in the presence of the Crown Prince. Countess Rosen, who noticed this, asked the Duke to sit, but he pretended not to hear, continued his conversation, and after the visit had passed one half hour, both the Duke and the beauty retired, satisfied and full of relief over this first step. The ladies of the Crown Prince, initially somewhat scandalised over this visit, soon found themselves content and spoke much to the advantage of Mamsell Hagman. The Duke had since long planned this and made himself the friend of all the ladies of the court.

To be presented for the female members of the court, was a sign that she was accepted, as it was socially acceptable to present a mistress for male nobles, but not for female ones.

== Official mistress ==
Sophie Hagman appeared openly with the prince at court, which together with Hedvig Taube made her one of only two official royal mistresses in the history of Sweden. She was called: "My little daughter-in-law" by the Queen Dowager and "Dearest Sister-in-law" by the king. The Poet Bellman called her an image of beauty: "Her entire being was a fest to my eyes", and the King once embraced her as a sister-in-law at Gripsholm Castle. The female courtiers was initially very snobby toward her, but Sophie Hagman understood how to make herself liked by most. Eventually, even Count Axel von Fersen the Elder, known as a strict moralist and highly disproving of all extramarital sexuality, acknowledges her quality and admitted that she had made a good impression on everyone. It was said that: "She differed from other royal mistresses in that she never abused her position by enriching herself".

In 1780, the relationship was temporarily broken because of Frederick Adolf's infatuation and marriage plans with Countess Margareta Lovisa Wrangel. Sophie Hagman was met with great sympathy at court because of the good impression she had made and because she was now without means to support herself, and Gustav III therefore promised her a pension. When the marriage negotiations with Wrangel failed and Frederick Adolf lost interest in her in 1781, he returned to Hagman and resumed the relationship with her. She was to have explained to him that she could no longer love him after he had hurt her, and after this, Frederick Adolf was never known to have been unfaithful to her.

Sophie Hagman was given rooms at the Royal Palace, Stockholm, and became the hostess at Tullgarn Palace, the private residence of Prince Frederick Adolf. Her relationship with the prince is described as a union of mutual love and happiness, and she never asked for any financial favours from him or from any other connections she made through him. Though she apparently never asked for anything, she was given many gifts without having asked for them. She was given three country estates by Frederick Adolf, a pension of 2.000 riksdaler by Gustav III to be paid annually as an insurance if her relationship to the prince was ever to end, and promised the title of Countess by Gustav III if she and Frederick Adolf was ever to have a son.

Sophie Hagman made a lasting impression of being unselfish. Count Adolf Ludvig Hamilton said about her: "It was impossible for anyone in her place to have been more noble" and described one episode in detail. At one occasion, the prince bought her an expensive Jewelry (a ring) on credit without paying for it, and the jeweler, who was in a difficult economic position, was waiting in the chamber of the prince day after day. Hagman noticed him, and when he described the situation, she said: "The prince are at present not in the possession of money, I can all too well live without this ornament, but not without your welfare," after which she returned the jewel to the jeweler in return for his promise to say nothing of the episode. Nevertheless, this story became well known and contributed to her good reputation.

In 1784, Axel von Fersen the Elder reported that Prince Frederick Adolf lived a quite private life with Sophie Hagman in a circle of close friends, and in 1786, Princess Hedvig Elisabeth Charlotte confirms that the prince isolated himself with Hagman at his estate, completely taken by her beauty. Sophie Hagman followed him to the royal palaces and to his official tasks.

About Sophie Hagman as the hostess of Tullgarn Palace she was described by Ehrensvärd:

"Mamsell Hagman was quite like a lady of the court. Her conversation was relaxed and pleasant. She displayed modesty and respect but no shyness or submission. The ladies showed her utmost respect. The gentlemen counted themselves lucky if the gave them but a minute"; she handled her role as a hostess: "Not with the arrogant pride of a Princess, but with the natural politeness of the middle class. And such a hostess this was! The appearance of a Venus, the manners of a Juno, the virtues of a Hebe."

This was later referred to this as "The Golden Age of Miss Sophie Hagman". There are a lot of episodes about the period of Sophie Hagman at Tullgarn, referred to as "Tullgarnsminnerna" ("Tullgarn memories"). Frederick Adolf was an eager hunter, and Hagman participated in the hunt with his male hunting friends. A poem was published about one of these hunts in 1847, named "Hertig Fredrik, Mamsell Hagman och gamla Margaretha" ("Duke Frederick, Mamsell Hagman and old Margaretha"), where the male hunting party was to have directed their attention to her rather than to the hunt itself, and during which Hagman met a beggar, old Margaretha, which she helped in the way with was associated with her; this episode was to have happened in 1791.

The 20 February 1787, a baby girl was baptised to Sophia Fredrica with Frederick Adolf and Sophie Hagman as godparents. The other godparents was Count Adolf Piper, Count Carl Posse, the nobles Pehr Reinhold Tersmeden and Pehr Sparre and professor Schulzenheim. The records states that "The parents shall remain unrecorded", but she is believed to have been the daughter of Frederick Adolf and Sophie Hagman. There are no more information about Sophia Fredrica.

During the Russo-Swedish War (1788–1790), Frederick Adolf came in conflict with the King, refused to serve under his brother Charles and left the army in December 1788. Both Gustav III, Princess Hedvig Elisabeth Charlotte and Princess Sophie Albertine of Sweden recommended that they should ask for Hagman's intervention, but there are no mention whether they actually did. During the absence of Frederick Adolf in Finland during the war, Sophie Hagman was courted by Anders Hahr (1764–1845), "a handsome young landlord", and when Frederick Adolf returned, she was pregnant by Hahr. Both Sophie Hagman and Ander Hahr expressed themselves willing to marry each other, but the prince refused to end his relationship with her. Frederick Adolf later returned to the war. While leaving for his permission in 1789, Gustav III uttered: "I expect he has left to attend to his Hares." Despite the fact that Sophie Hagman was said to have been pregnant at several occasions, there are no information which confirms that she had any children.

== Later life ==
The relationship between Sophie Hagman and Frederick Adolf ended amiable in 1793, as it seems by mutual consent, after which they both had other relationships. Frederick Adolf replaced her with the actress Euphrosyne Löf, while Sophie Hagman entered into a relationship with the singer and composer Edvard du Puy. The relationship with Du Puy was to have led to the birth of a child, though there is no information of a child. The relationship ended when Du Puy left on a trip for Germany, where she followed him only to be refused.

Hagman visited Copenhagen in 1795 and a second time in the early 19th century. The second time she was in the company of Du Puy under the name "Mrs Hedengrahn". The first time, she was in the company of a "Mrs Jouffrouy", the wife of Prince Frederick Adolf's economy minister, and met the poet and bishop Franz Michael Franzén, who wrote a description of their encounter. He described her as still beautiful and worthy of respect for never having abused her influence over the Duke. At this point, she apparently had the responsibility of her brother's children, as she told Franzén that she contemplated to arrange a place for her nephew on an East India ship, but there is no more information of that.

In 1796 and 1802, she made pleasure trips to Paris under the name "Madame Hedengrahn" in the company of Captain Carl Christian Ehrenhoff. In 1801, she apparently had plans to marry Ehrenhoff, but the plans were never effectuated. Sophie Hagman lived the last years of her life "admired for her still preserved beauty, her lovable, pleasant being and her good heart", and was a popular hostess, giving small balls and suppers for people such as the sculptor Johan Tobias Sergel.

She spent the winters in Stockholm and her summers at the villa Lilla Kina near Drottningholm Palace. She lived with her sister, Elisabeth Bjurström, who was a widow after an officer, and her two nieces Sophie Bjurström and Augusta Bjurström and nephew Pehr Bjurström.

After her relationship to Prince Frederick Adolf ended, Sophie Hagman lived on a royal pension. When Frederick Adolf died, she received a second pension from the state. These pensions was, among others granted from the royal house, exposed to critic from Baron Stael von Holstein on Riddarhuset in 1809. Sophie Hagman died in 1826 and willed her property to her sister's children and to her close friend Jeanette Stenström.

== Sources ==
- Carin Österberg: Svenska Kvinnor. Föregångare, pionjärer (Swedish women: Predecessors, pioneers) (in Swedish)
- Carl Forsstrand (in Swedish): Sophie Hagman och hennes samtida. Några anteckningar från det gustavianska Stockholm. (English: Sophie Hagman and her contemporaries. Notes from Stockholm during the Gustavian age") Second edition. Wahlström & Widstrand, Stockholm (1911)
- Andersson, Ingvar (red.), Gustavianskt: [1771-1810] : en bokfilm, [Ny utg.], Wahlström & Widstrand, Stockholm, 1979
- (in Swedish)
- (in Swedish)
- Svenskt biografiskt lexikon (Swedish Biographical Dictionary) (in Swedish)
- Svenska folket underbara öden, Carl G. Rimberg (in Swedish)
- Anteckningar om svenska qvinnor (in Swedish)
