= Giovanna Bassi =

Italian-Swedish ballerina (1762–1834)

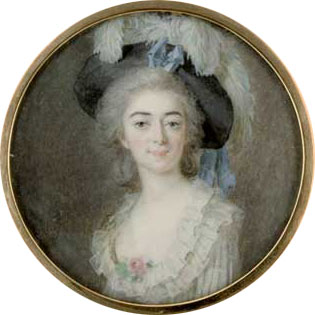
Giovanna Bassi. Miniature by Cornelius Høyer

Silhouette of Giovanna Bassi.

Giovanna Bassi (1762–1834) was an Italian ballerina who spent the majority of her career in Sweden. She was regarded as the prima donna of the Swedish Ballet during the Gustavian age.

== Biography ==
Giovanna Bassi was born in Italy as the daughter of the Italian ballet dancer Angela Bassi. She was the sister of the architect Charles (Carlo) Bassi (1772–1840), who lived in Sweden and Finland, where he had been raised since the age of eleven. She was the student of Jean Dauberval and debuted on the stage of the opera in Paris in France.

=== Career in the Royal Swedish Ballet ===
In 1783, she was employed at the Royal Swedish Ballet in the Royal Swedish Opera in Sweden, where she was to spend the rest of her career.

Bassi is mentioned in the famous diary of Hedwig Elizabeth Charlotte of Holstein-Gottorp. Her technique was entirely according to the classic Italian style of ballet, and she was capable of performing the hardest movements within this style. At her debut in Stockholm, the applause was loud enough "to outdo the thunder", and caused what was to be referred to as the "Bassi fever".

Bassi was described as a proud person with a "noble" manner and admired for her beautiful, black hair and her strong, limber body. Among her parts were Cecile in La Rosiere de Salency by Jean Marcadet with Antoine Bournonville, Judith Christina Brelin and Jean Marcadet, Ninette a la Tour by M. Gardel in the 1786–87 season, and Nadine in Le Triomphe de la Constance by Jean Marcadet with Giuseppe Bartolomei, Antoine Bournonville, Jean Marcadet and Carlo Caspare Simone Uttini (1787–88).

She took pupils and was the mentor of many Swedish dancers, notably Ulrika Åberg and Margaretha Christina Åbergsson. She also gave dancing classes for girls from the upper classes. She occasionally performed as an actor at the French Theatre. Giovanna Bassi became wealthy: initially with a salary of 9,000 livres, she had a fortune of 30,000 riksdaler at the time of her retirement.

=== Private life ===
Bassi had a daughter, Johanna Fredrika (1787–1810), presumed to be fathered by Count Adolf Fredrik Munck af Fulkila, with whom she had a relationship at the time. By persistent rumours, the count was said to be the true father of Gustav IV Adolf of Sweden, and Bassi's daughter was said to have a strong resemblance to the King, who might have been her half-brother. Bassi's daughter was further said to be the role model for the character Tintomara in the famous novel Drottningens juvelsmycke by Carl Jonas Love Almquist. In that novel, Tintomara is portrayed as the half-sibling of King Gustav IV Adolf and the issue of Count Adolf Fredrik Munck af Fulkila.

When Count Adolf Fredrik Munck af Fulkila was exiled in 1792, Bassi left the ballet and followed him to Rome, where she expected him to formally acknowledge their daughter and marry her. He refused on both accounts, however, which she regarded as a grave insult. When Munck later made her daughter a beneficiary in his will, she refused to accept it and denied the intended inheritance in her daughter's name. During her stay in Italy, she also received large sums of money from the Swedish de facto regent, Gustaf Adolf Reuterholm, for whom she acted as a secret agent with the task of providing evidence and conducting inquiries against the exiled Gustaf Mauritz Armfelt. She returned to Sweden in 1794 and reentered the Swedish Ballet, but she was only to remain there for a short while.

=== Later life ===
In 1794, Bassi married the German-Swedish merchant Peter Hinrik Schön (1765–1821). She made her last performance in De två Savojarderna (The Two Savoyards) in June 1794. In her marriage contract, Giovanna Bassi stipulated that her spouse should acknowledge her daughter with Munck as his, and that her great fortune should remain her personal and sole property. Schön was bankrupt at the time of the marriage, but was afterwards able to buy Ekholmsnäs Manor at Lidingö. Bassi spent the rest of her life as a businesswoman, attending to her manor, a brick factory and a snus factory. She lived with her mother and her friend, the actress Elise Dubelloi from the French Theatre in Sweden, and she also had three sons with Schön. She converted to Lutheranism in 1815.
