= Hägglund =

Hägglund is a Swedish surname. Notable people with the surname include:

- Alvar Hägglund, Swedish cross-country skier
- Bengt Hägglund, Swedish theologian
- Göran Hägglund, Swedish politician
- Gustav Hägglund, Finnish general
- Joel Emmanuel Hägglund, birth name of Swedish-born American labor organiser Joe Hill
- Jenna Hagglund (born 1989), American volleyball player
- Johan Hägglund (1866–1956), Swedish furniture maker and founder of the Hägglund & Söner engineering company
- Jöran Hägglund, Swedish politician
- Martin Hägglund, Swedish literary theorist and philosopher
- Roger Hägglund, Swedish hockey player
- Woldemar Hägglund, Finnish general

== See also ==
- Hägglund & Söner, a former Swedish engineering company
- Hägglunds (disambiguation)
- Haglund (disambiguation)
