= Rosalia Price =

British circus performer

Rosalia Price née Masson (fl. 1790), also known as Rosalia Masson-Price and Madame Price, was a British circus artist (acrobat and pantomime artist). She is not to be confused with her sister-in-law Hanne Tott, also called Madame Price.

She was active in Sweden in 1787–1790. Together with her spouse, the acrobat Peter Price (1761-1790), she founded the first circus in Stockholm, Sweden and Scandinavia, and as such has an important place in the history of the circus in Sweden and Scandinavia. Alongside Antonio Bartolomeo Spinacuta, Price are counted as one of two of all of the foreign artists during the Gustavian age who made a lasting effect on the cultural development in Sweden.

== Life ==
Rosalia Masson was married to her colleague Peter Price from London, with whom she had three children. Together with her brother-in-law James Price (1761-1805), they founded a circus company, where they mainly performed with acrobats and pantomime artists by horse. After having applied for a permission to perform in Denmark without success, they were granted such a permission for Sweden, and in October 1787, they founded a circus in Stockholm.

Though an individual horse acrobat, Jacob Bates, had performed in Stockholm in 1770, the Price circus was the first circus company in Sweden, and thereby the introduction of the circus in Scandinavia: her brother-in-law James and his spouse Hanne Tott was to introduce the circus in Denmark and Norway in the 1790s.

The Price circus were successful in Stockholm, where Rosalia was apparently the main attraction as she was frequently mentioned first when the circus was mentioned; she focused on acrobatics on horse while Peter Price acted in pantomime and displayed his strength.

They also toured the Swedish countryside. At an incident at Comediehuset in Gothenburg, Rosalia Price threatened the audience with a whip and a gun when they expressed displeasure, which turned a fiasco to a success.

The Price Circus left Sweden in 1790: Peter Price apparently died the same year, as Rosalia Price remarried the horse acrobat Christoph de Bach the same year and followed him to Vienna.
