= Hägglunds (disambiguation) =

Hägglund & Söner is a former Swedish engineering company.

Hägglunds or Hagglunds may also refer to:

== Companies ==
- Alvis Hägglunds, a subsidiary of Alvis that acquired Hägglund & Söner's military vehicles business in 1997
- BAE Systems Hägglunds, a subsidiary of BAE Systems that acquired Alvis Hagglunds in 2004

== Products ==
- Hägglunds Bv 206, an all-terrain vehicle designed by Hägglund & Söner and now manufactured by BAE Systems Hägglunds
- Hägglunds BvS 10, an all-terrain vehicle designed and manufactured by BAE Systems Hägglunds
- Hägglunds Drive Systems, a range of hydraulic motors designed by Hägglund & Söner and now manufactured by Bosch Rexroth

== Other uses ==
- Hägglunds Arena, an indoor sporting arena located in Örnsköldsvik, Sweden

== See also ==
- Hägglund (disambiguation)
