= Carolina Kuhlman =

Swedish opera singer

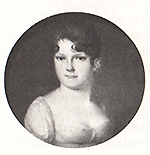
- Carolina Kuhlman
- Born: Carolina Ottilia Kuhlman; 15 November 1778; Stockholm, Sweden
- Died: 12 April 1866 (aged 87–88); Stockholm, Sweden
- Other names: Carolina Deland and Carolina Åbergsson
- Spouse(s): Louis Deland (first spouse) and Gustav Åbergsson (second spouse)

Ottilia Carolina Kuhlman (15 November 1778 – 12 April 1866) was a Swedish stage actress. She was an elite member of the Royal Dramatic Theatre, where she was considered the leading lady in the early 19th-century. She was an instructor and deputy principal of the Royal Dramatic Training Academy. She was also known as Carolina Deland and Carolina Åbergsson.

== Life ==
Carolina Kuhlman was the daughter of Julius K. Kuhlman, Oboe player at the Hovkapellet, and Andrika Hallar. In 1791, she was enrolled at the Royal Dramatic Training Academy, and became the student of Anne Marie Milan Desguillons in 1793. As such, she participated a student actress at the Royal Dramatic Theatre.

=== Career ===
Carolina Kuhlman was contracted as First Premier Actress at the Royal Dramatic Theatre in 1800, a position she kept until 1833. She made a pause in her career at the royal stage in 1820–23, when her husband was director of the Segerlind theatre in Gothenburg and she joined him as an actress there. She was an instructor of declamation and deputy principal of the Royal Dramatic Training Academy in 1829–31.

Kuhlman belonged to the most successful actors of the Royal Dramatic Theatre during her tenure there. She was generally given good reviews and praised for her realism, her grace and her well balanced mimic. She successfully played the leading women's roles of soubrette and ingenue for many years, and continued to the category of mere noble after 1823, in which she was also appreciated for her dignity and style. She was however not considered to be very good in tragedies.

In 1803, Clas Livijn described her role as Hildegard in Johanna von Montfaucon by Kotzebue: "You should see her act! I am completely taken by her person in this ancient costume: the language she spoke, everything draw a portrait of one of the innocent girls of past times [...] Yes, her action was to remarkable, that I doubt anyone in Sweden can be compared to her."

In 1819, she and her second spouse acted in the main roles of Romeo and Juliet in its premiere at the royal stage.

=== Roles ===
Her most known parts was Emma in Korsfararne (The Crusaders) by Koetzebue, Hildegard in Joahnna av Montfaucon by Kotzebue, Cherubin in The marriage of Figaro, the deaf and mute boy Jules in Abbe del'Épée by Bouilly, Mrs Dorsan in Den ondsinta hustrun, (The Evil Wife) Elvira in Tartuffe. She played Ophelia in Hamlet with her own husband in 1819; this was the first time this play had been performed in Stockholm. She played "a French woman " in Karavanen (The Caravane) by Gretry and Wilhelm in Musikvurmen (Music Craze) by Grenier (season 1796–97), Isabella in Den talande tavlan (The speaking painting) by Gretry (1798–99), Zemire in Panurge på lanterneön (Panurge on the lantern island) by Gretry and Cecile in Hemligheten (The Secret) by Solié (1799–1800), Alexandrine in En fjärdedels timmes tystnad (A quarter of an hour's silence) (1809–10), Regina in De löjliga möterna (Redicoulous encounters) by Isouard (1813–14), Madame Durandiére in Världshuset i Bagniéres (The Inn at Bagnieres) (1817–18) and Barbara in Oxmenuetten (The Ox-menuette) by Haydn (1825–26).

=== Private life ===
Carolina Kuhlman married the dancer Louis Deland in 1799 and divorced him in 1802. After her divorce, she called herself Mrs Kuhlman. She seems to have made a certain precedence. Divorce became quite accepted among actors after her divorce and it also became common for actresses to follow her example in regard to their name and title after divorce, and retake their birth name, but keep the title of Mrs: something known for example Charlotta Eriksson and Elise Frösslind.

In 1815, she married her lover, the actor Gustav Åbergsson. Carolina Kuhlman and Gustav Åbergsson were known to have a relationship for years prior to their marriage. In 1811, she made a study trip to Paris to study the French theater with her lover (likely first time an actress of the Royal Dramatic Theatre made such a trip) which was mentioned by Anders Fredrik Skjöldebrand: "An actor of the higher comedy, Mr Åbergsson, had in the company of his mistress, an excellent actress in her own right, who were later to become his wife, went to Paris to develop himself in his profession", and on their return brought with them the play Cendrillon by Nicolo Isouard, the main women's role of which Åbergsson demanded to be given to Kuhlman.
