= Hanne Tott =

Danish circus performer (1771–1826)

Hanne Tott or Tod, also called Price and Kuhn (14 February 1771 - August 15, 1826), was a Danish circus artist and circus manager. She and her family played an important part in the history of the circus in Scandinavia. She is not to be confused with her sister-in-law Rosalia Price, also called Madame Price.

She was born to Stephen and Hanne Todd and married in 1791 to the British circus manager James Price (1761-1805) and became the mother of the performers James Price (1801-1865), Carl Price (1803-?) and Adolph Price (1805-1890).

She and her spouse toured Scandinavia, Denmark, Sweden and Norway with their circus. In 1793-94, they performed at Stenborg Theatre in Stockholm. From 1795, they regularly performed in Copenhagen during the summer and toured Denmark and Norway during the winter. They were permitted to found a permanent stage in Copenhagen in 1801.

She became manager after the death of her spouse in 1805. In 1810, she married Frantz Joseph Kuhn (1783-1832), with whom she shared her position as manager.
