= Catharina Torenberg =

Finnish violinist

Catharina Margareta Torenberg, also referred to as Katariina Torenberg-Annell (1787–1866), was a Finnish violinist.

She was the daughter of the organist builder Karl Torenberg. She debuted in Åbo (Turku) in 1802 and was active as a concert violinist there until she moved to Sweden in 1805. She was the first professional female violinist in Finland. A student of Erik Ferling, she attracted attention for her talent. She discontinued her career after her marriage with the vicar Johan Annell of Strängnäs in Sweden, because contemporary norm did not regard it suitable for a married woman of her class to perform in public, and then performed only before her friends in private. She returned to Åbo in 1865.
