= Taffeltäckare =

Designation for court employees in the Royal Court of Sweden

Taffeltäckare (literally table coverer) is a designation for court employees in the Royal Court of Sweden with responsibility for laying out the royal table for meals and banquets.
