= Tullgarn Palace =

Coordinates: 58°57′05″N 17°34′40″E

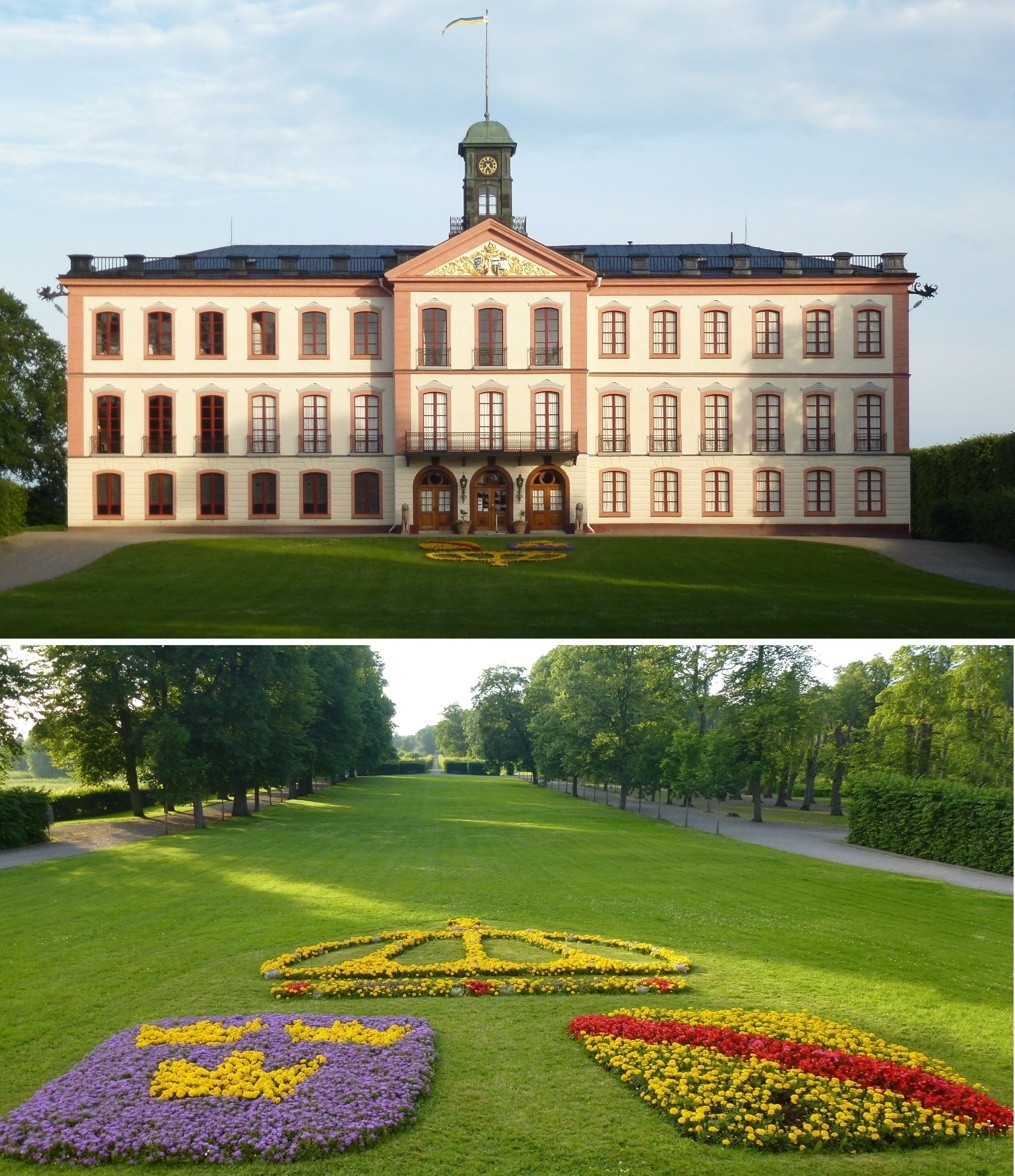
- Interactive map of the Tullgarn Palace area

General information
- Type: Palace
- Location: Södertälje Municipality, Stockholm County, Sweden
- Owner: Government of Sweden

Tullgarn Palace (Swedish: Tullgarns slott) is a royal summer palace in the province of Södermanland, south of Stockholm, Sweden. Built in the 1720s, the palace offers a mixture of rococo, Gustavian and Victorian styles. The interior design is regarded as one of Sweden's finest.

Tullgarn Palace is mainly associated with King Gustaf V and Queen Victoria, who spent their summers here at the end of the 19th century and beginning of the 20th century. However, the palace was originally built for Duke Fredrik Adolf in the 1770s. Since Tullgarn was a popular summer palace amongst Swedish royalty, the palace houses fine examples of interiors from different epochs and personal styles, such as the small drawing room, decorated in the 1790s, the breakfast room in southern German Renaissance style from the 1890s and Gustaf V's cigar room, which has remained largely untouched since his death in 1950.

== History ==
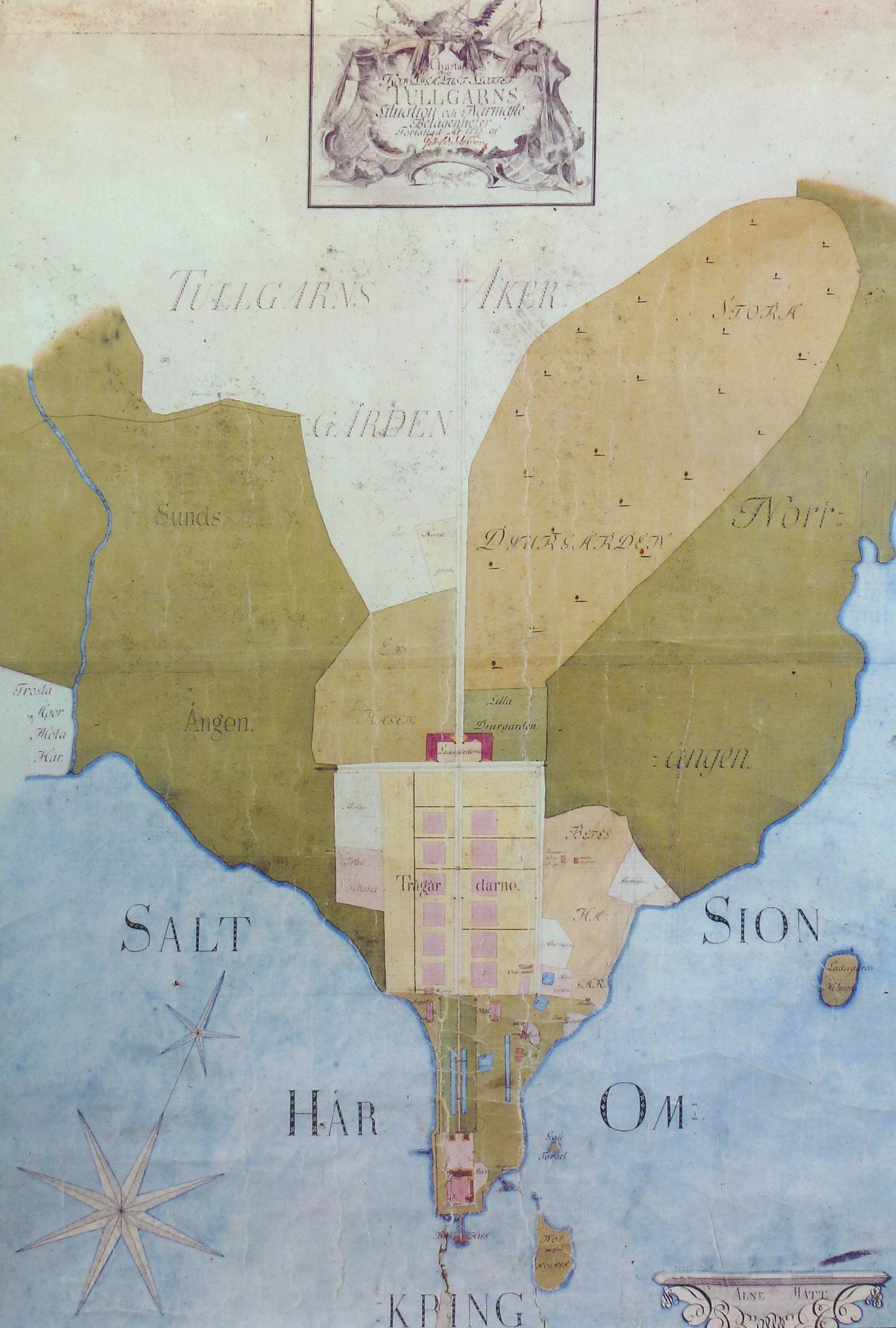
A map of the palace and its surroundings, dated 1773

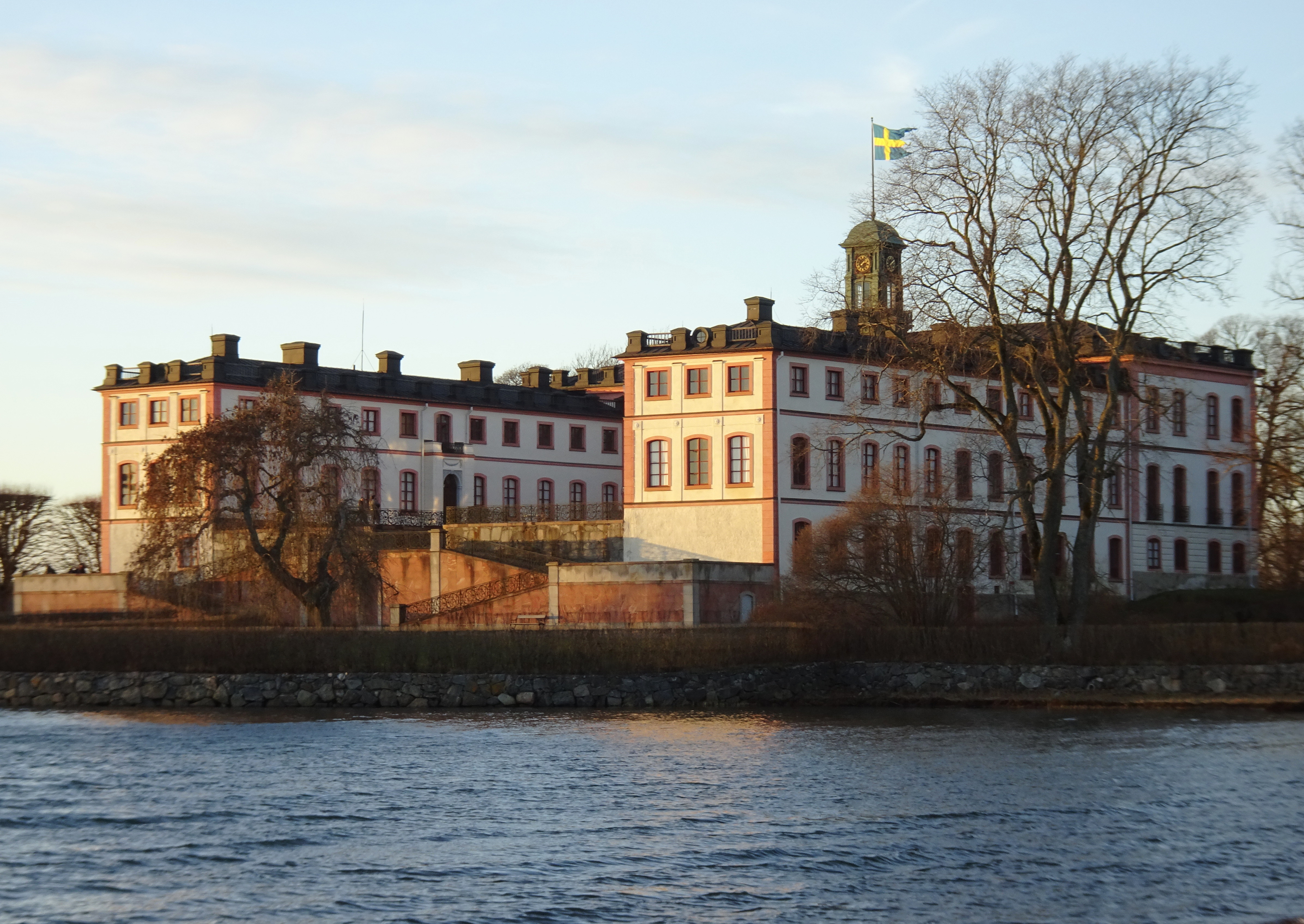
Tullgarn Palace

In 1719, the old Renaissance castle from the late 16th century was demolished. The newly appointed Privy Councillor Magnus Julius De la Gardie, who was in possession of a great fortune through his marriage to Hedvig Catharina Lillie, commissioned architect Joseph Gabriel Destain to design the present palace, built between 1720 and 1727. The courtyard is open to the sea and took on its present appearance in the 1820s. It was modelled on the garden of Logården at the Stockholm Palace.

In 1772, Tullgarn was acquired by the crown and became a royal residence. Occupancy was granted to Duke Fredrik Adolf, youngest brother of King Gustav III. Between 1778 and 1793, Frederick Adolf resided there with his lover Sophie Hagman, and many episodes from this period are preserved as the Tullgarnsmminnena, The Tullgarn memories. Frederick Adolf modernized the palace in neoclassical style, adding another storey to the wings, giving the palace a flat Italian-style roof. Fredrik Adolf's interiors are some of the finest examples of Gustavian style in Sweden. Among the designers involved were Louis Masreliez, Jean Baptiste Masreliez, Per Ljung and Ernst Philip Thoman. Many of the interiors created at that time remain today in their original form.

After the death of Frederick Adolf, it was granted to his sister, Princess Sophia Albertina, who spent all her summers her until her death in 1829. The following year, it was granted to the heir to the throne, the future Oscar I of Sweden, and served as the summer residence of the Swedish royal court during his reign.

King Gustaf V (then crown prince) took over Tullgarn in 1881 and together with his consort Victoria, implemented extensive changes. The main building was decorated more like a modern functional summer home than a royal pleasure palace. Much of the present interior dates from the time of King Gustaf V and Queen Victoria, including the vestibule, whose walls are covered in hand-painted Dutch tiles. The breakfast room is furnished like a south German Bierstube, possibly reflecting the fact that Queen Victoria came from Baden in Southern Germany. The royal couple used the palace as their summer residence. In 1924, Ethiopian Crown Prince Ras Tafari (later Emperor Haile Selassie) stayed at Tullgarn while touring Europe.

== Literature ==
- Bedoire, Fredric (2006), Svenska slott och herrgårdar (in Swedish), Stockholm: Bonnier, ISBN 91-0-010577-5
