= Andreas Widerberg =

Swedish translator and actor (1766–1810)

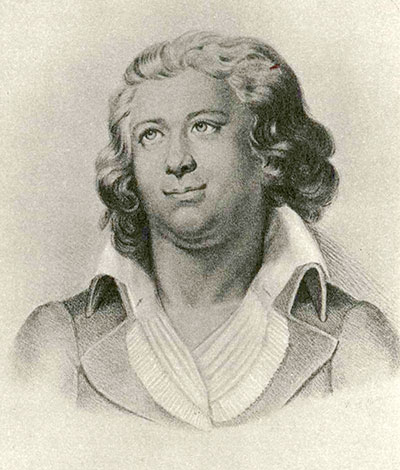
Andreas Widerberg

Andreas Widerberg (28 October 1766- 25 April 1810) was a Swedish stage actor. He belonged to the elite of the pioneer generation actors of the Royal Dramatic Theatre. He was famous for his roles as hero and lover and noticed for his attractive looks.

Andreas Widerberg was the son of a bookkeeper in Gothenburg. He was a star actor of the comedy house Comediehuset in Gothenburg in 1780-90. He was its artistic director under the supervision of Lovisa Simson (1746–1808) from 1786-90. In 1790, he attracted the attention of King Gustav III of Sweden and was engaged at the Royal Dramatic Theatre in Stockholm.

He was married to the actress Anna Catharina Widebäck (1765-1824) and the father of Henriette Widerberg (1796–1872).

== Other sources ==
- Nordensvan, Georg, Svensk teater och svenska skådespelare från Gustav III till våra dagar. Förra delen, 1772-1842, Bonnier, Stockholm, 1917
