= Prince Frederick Adolf, Duke of Östergötland =

Swedish prince (1750–1803)

Prince Frederick Adolf
- Duke of Östergötland
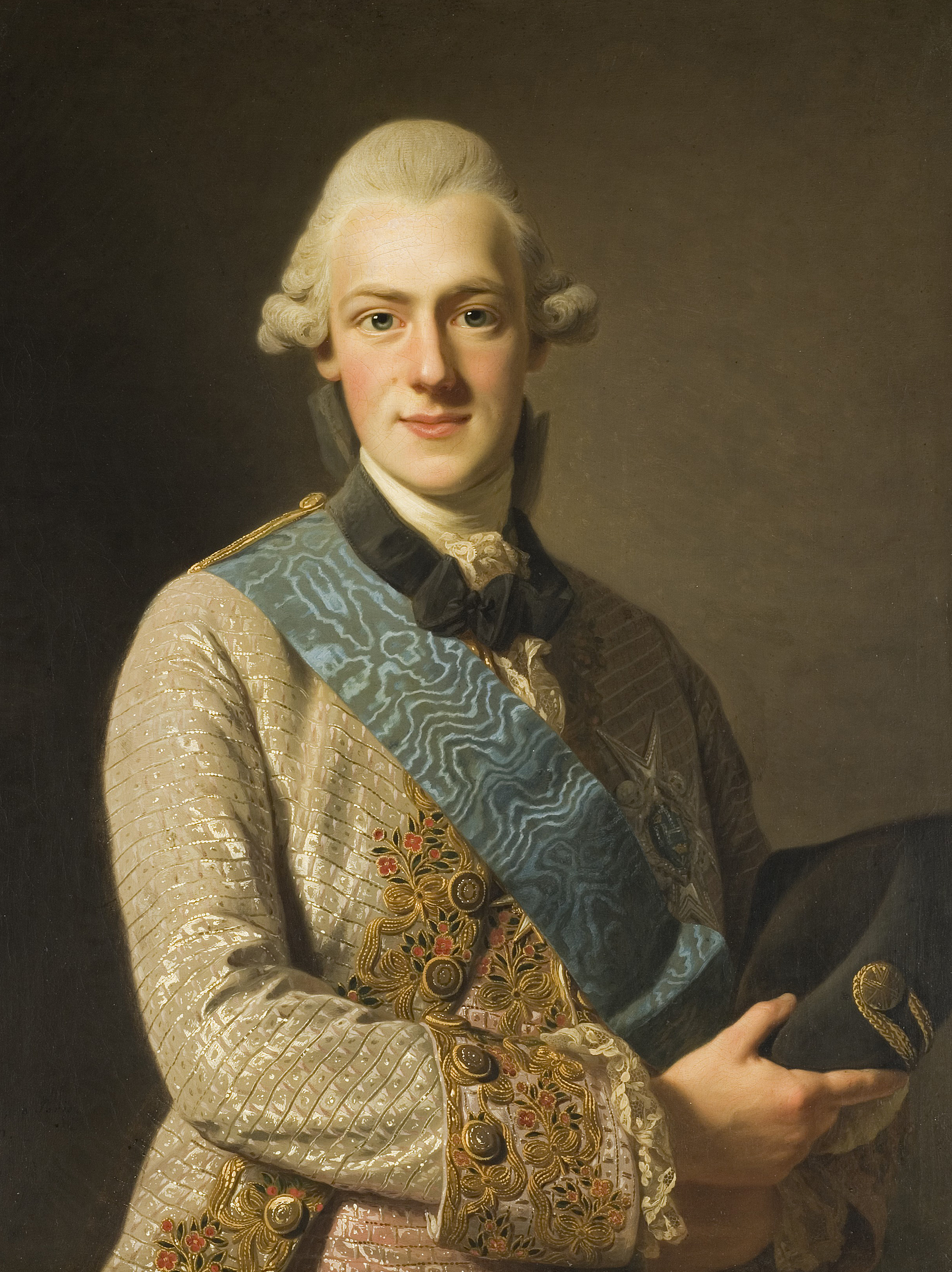
- Portrait by Alexander Roslin, c. 1770
- Born: 18 July 1750; Drottningholm, Sweden
- Died: 12 December 1803 (aged 53); Montpellier, France
- Burial: Riddarholmen Church
- House: Holstein-Gottorp
- Father: Adolf Frederick of Sweden
- Mother: Louisa Ulrika of Prussia

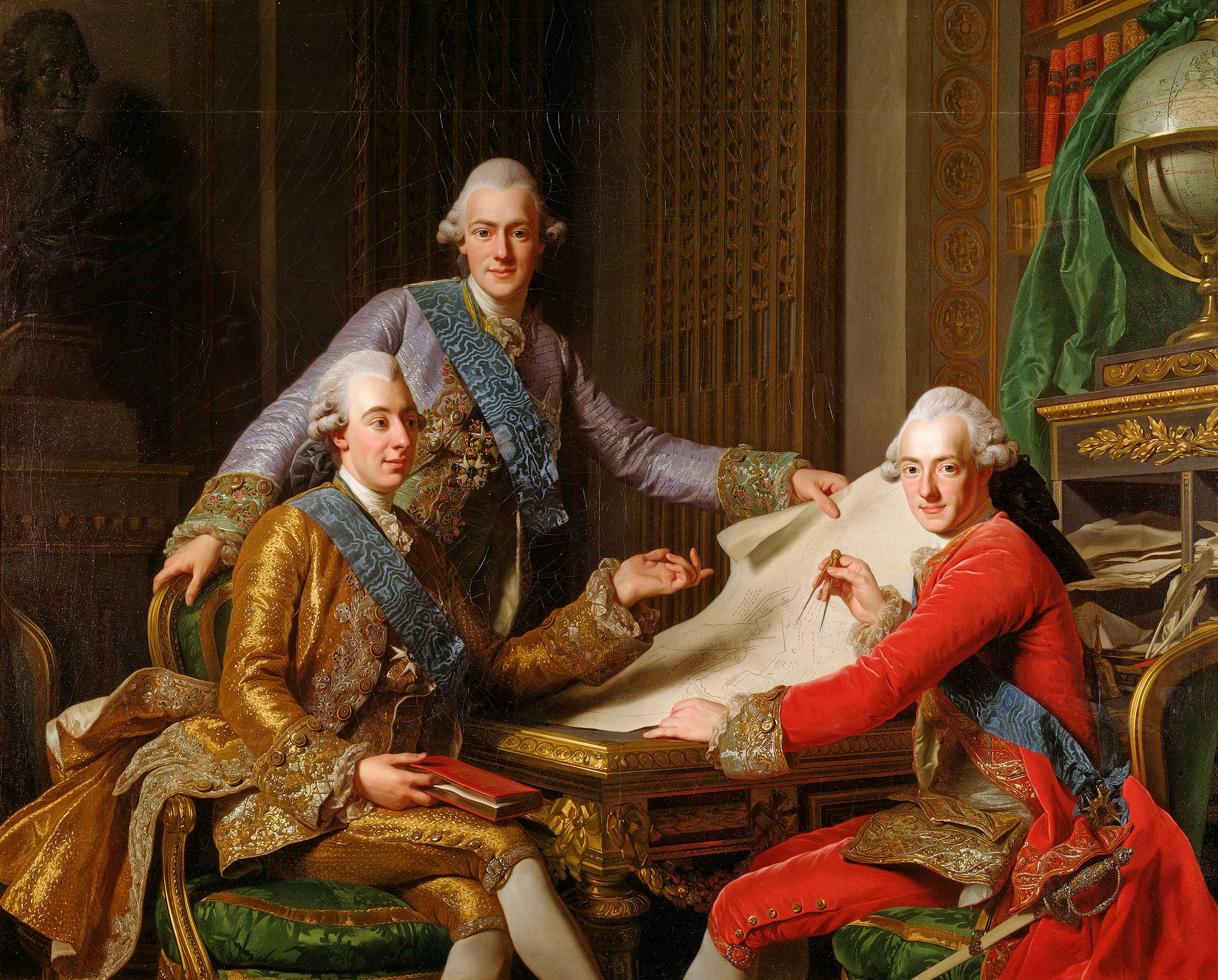
Duke Frederick Adolf with his older brothers King Gustav III of Sweden (sitting, left) and Duke Charles of Södermanland (sitting, right), by Alexander Roslin 1771.

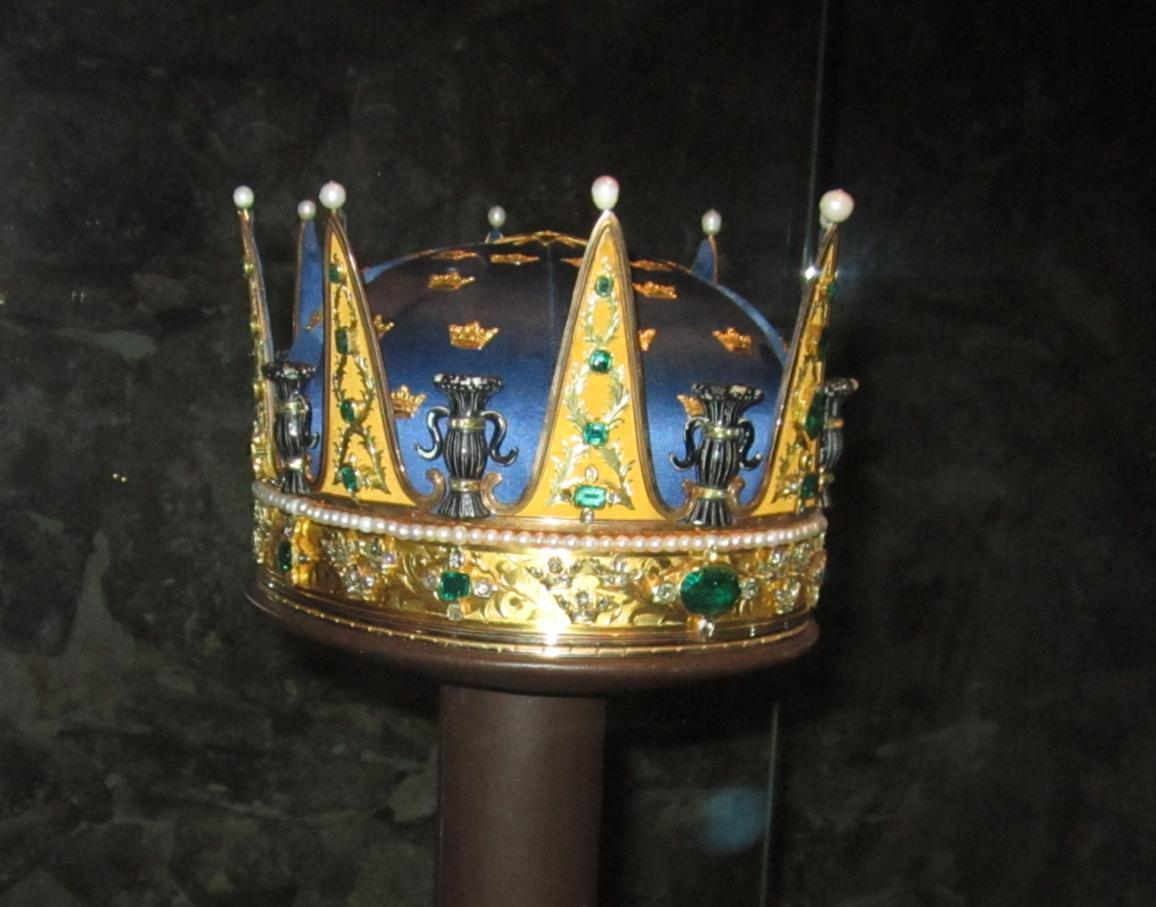
Coronet created for Prince Frederick Adolf and worn at his brother Gustav's coronation in 1772.

Prince Frederick Adolf, Duke of Östergötland (Swedish: Fredrik Adolf; 18 July 1750 – 12 December 1803) was a Swedish Prince, youngest son of King Adolf Frederick of Sweden and Louisa Ulrika of Prussia, a sister of Frederick the Great, King of Prussia. He was given the title Duke of Östergötland.

== Life ==
During his childhood, Frederick Adolf was under the tutelage of Ulrica Schönström. The Duke was described as "the most beautiful Prince in Europe" and was described as sensitive and spoiled by his mother. He and his sister, Sophia Albertina, were their mother's favourites and also devoted to each other. During family conflicts, such as the famous succession scandal regarding the questioned legitimacy of the Crown Prince in 1778, he and his sister were on their mother's side against that of their brothers Charles and Gustav. As a child, he had a weak health and a fierce temperament. His education became somewhat lacking.

Frederik was made colonel in 1762, general major in 1768, general lieutenant in 1774, commander of the Västmanland Regiment in 1775 and field marshal in 1792. He was given a minor role in the Revolution of 1772 of his brother Gustav III, who gave him the task of agitating in Södermanland and Östergötland.

=== Reign of Gustav III ===
He was given the title Duke of Östergötland on 8 September 1772 and the Tullgarn Palace as his residence.

During the great succession scandal, the so-called Munck Affair in 1778, when the queen dowager Louisa Ulrika questioned the legitimacy of the Crown prince in reference to the rumors that Gustav III had convinced Adolf Fredrik Munck to impregnate the queen, Sophia Magdalena of Denmark, Frederick sided with his mother and defended her before the king by pointing out that these rumors had not been invented by their mother but were in fact widespread rumors, and he reportedly said to his brother the king: "The entire city is talking of it, and it is commonly believed that You are not altogether man, and that it is because of this reason, that You have enticed the Queen to it to have an heir to the Kingdom." It was Frederick who convinced Louisa Ulrika to receive Gustav III on her deathbed in 1782, thereby accomplishing peace between them.

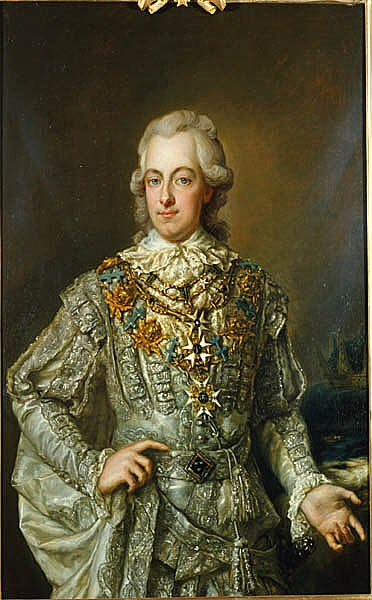
Prince Frederick Adolf, portrayed in princely attire as he appeared at the coronation of his brother, Gustav III, in 1772. Artist unknown. His crown can be seen behind him on the right.

His sister-in-law, Hedwig Elizabeth Charlotte of Holstein-Gottorp, describes him as beautiful, with expressive eyes, an easygoing temper, and very handsome when he dresses properly, though often badly dressed in his private life, and gives the estimation that he would have been a greater social success, if he did not say so many suggestive things and had such a filthy mouth [that is to say, he used a sexually suggestive language], which he acquired because he had spent too much time with men, and had such a weakness for women and sex. He had no tasks in his life other than the ceremonial, and spent his life wasting money and involving himself in love affairs. Gustav III reportedly had no high opinion of his intellectual capacity. Frederick was an honorary member of the Swedish Royal Academy of Fine Arts, and he did occasionally show a genuine interest in the affairs of the academy, as well as in the management of the Västmanland regiment. He devoted much time to country life on his estate, Tullgarn. His economic affairs were in bad shape, and in 1791 he was finally declared bankrupt and placed under administration until 1802.

Frederick served in the Russo-Swedish War in Finland in 1788. During the Battle of Hogland, Frederick wished to send reinforcements by fleet to aid his brother, Duke Charles. This was prevented, and Frederick left the army in protest to Gustav III, whom he referred to as a tyrant. He thereby came to belong to the opposition, and he also became involved in the planned coup by his sister-in-law to depose the monarch; the 1789 Conspiracy. In the autumn of 1789, Hedvig Elisabeth Charlotte prepared to depose Gustav III and place her husband Duke Charles upon the throne. Her ideal was the Swedish Constitution of 1772, which she saw as a good tool for an enlightened aristocracy, and the war and the Union and Security Act had made her a leading part of the opposition. She cooperated with Prince Frederick Adolf and Gustaf Adolf Reuterholm. The plan was to force Charles to act as a symbol of the opposition to the Union and Security Act when the time was right. When the time arrived to make Charles act, however, he refused, which effectively discontinued the coup.

=== Reign of Gustav IV Adolf ===
In July 1793, he was given the position to chair the government during the journey of the king and the regent in the southern provinces, but nothing whatsoever was apparently accomplished during his tenure, and during a similar journey in 1794, he was not entrusted again.

In 1800, Frederick Adolf left Sweden for health reasons and travelled to Germany and then to France. He died in Montpellier in France in 1803.

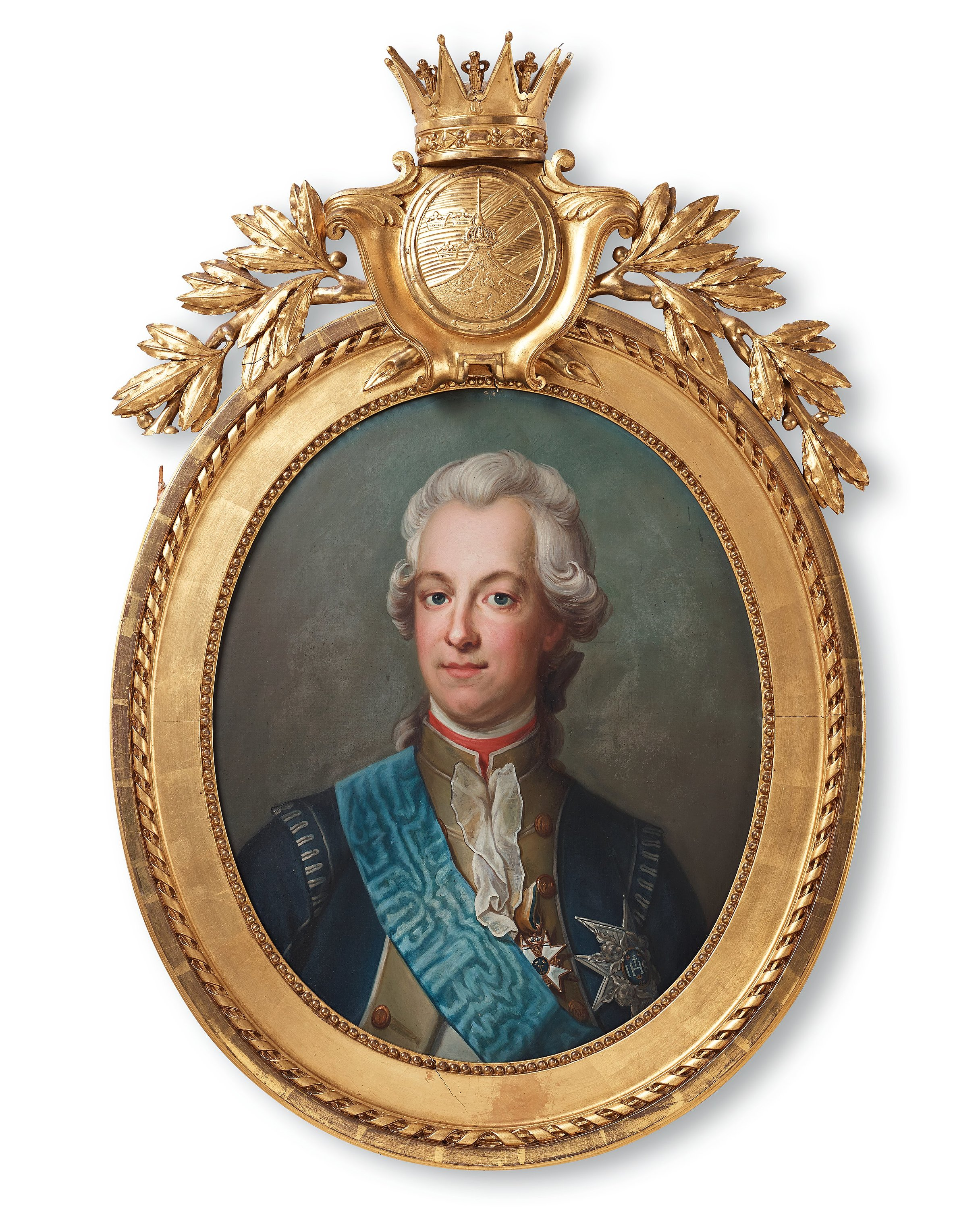
Duke Frederick Adolf wearing uniform m/1779 for the Västmanland Regiment. Over the shoulder the ribbon of the Order of the Seraphim, and on the chest its badge. He also wears the Order of the Sword badge. The frame is adorned with the ducal crown and the coat of arms of Östergötland, when Frederick Adolf was Duke of Östergötland. Painting from the 1780s, and attributed to Jakob Björck.

=== Private life ===
Prince Fredrick Adolf is in fact most known in history for his love life. He was never married, and the ceremonial duties of his consort were performed by his sister Sophia Albertina. He had several plans to marry, but none of them was realised. His first proposal was to the Countess Ulla von Höpken, but she was married quickly to another, and he accompanied his brother Gustav to France in 1770 to forget her.

In 1774, he proposed to the cousin of his former love, Countess Sophie von Fersen, daughter of Axel von Fersen the Elder and sister of Axel von Fersen the Younger, the alleged lover of Marie Antoinette. She and her father refused, as they were afraid that she would be badly treated by his brother and mother, who were reluctant to give their consent, and because she was already engaged, and Frederick Adolf was sent to Italy in 1776 until she was married.

He lived from 1778 to 1795, in a happy relationship at the Tullgarn Palace with the ballet dancer Sophie Hagman, who was well liked at court, and had a daughter, Sophia Frederica, with her in 1787. In 1780, he temporarily ended his relationship with Hagman and proposed to the noble Margaretha Lovisa Wrangel, with whom he became informally engaged. The King gave his permission to the marriage with the condition that it was postponed for a year, during which Wrangel was sent to Scania, with the thought that his brother would change his mind when the time was up. This was also the case, and Frederick Adolf returned to Hagman in 1781.

After his relationship with Hagman ended, he proposed to Princess Augusta Sophia of the United Kingdom in 1797, and after his relationship with Euphrosyne Löf ended, he proposed to Dorothea von Medem, dowager duchess of Courland in 1801, but none of the marriages was realized.

== Ancestry ==
Ancestors of Prince Frederick Adolf, Duke of Östergötland

16. Frederick III, Duke of Holstein-Gottorp
8. Christian Albert, Duke of Holstein-Gottorp
17. Marie Elisabeth of Saxony
4. Christian August of Holstein-Gottorp, Prince of Eutin
18. Frederick III of Denmark
9. Frederikke Amalie of Denmark
19. Sophie Amalie of Brunswick-Lüneburg
2. Adolf Frederick of Sweden
20. Friedrich VI, Margrave of Baden-Durlach
10. Frederick VII, Margrave of Baden-Durlach
21. Christine Magdalen of Zweibrücken
5. Albertina Frederica of Baden-Durlach
22. Frederick III, Duke of Holstein-Gottorp (= 16)
11. Auguste Marie of Holstein-Gottorp
23. Marie Elisabeth of Saxony (= 17)
1. Prince Frederick Adolf of Sweden
24. Frederick William, Elector of Brandenburg
12. Frederick I of Prussia
25. Louise Henriette of Orange-Nassau
6. Frederick William I of Prussia
26. Ernest Augustus, Elector of Hanover
13. Sophia Charlotte of Hanover
27. Sophia, Countess Palatine of Simmern
3. Louisa Ulrika of Prussia
28. Ernest Augustus, Elector of Hanover (= 26)
14. George I of Great Britain
29. Sophia, Countess Palatine of Simmern (= 27)
7. Sophia Dorothea of Hanover
30. George William, Duke of Brunswick-Lüneburg
15. Sophia Dorothea of Celle
31. Eleonore d'Esmier d'Olbreuse
