= Tommie Haglund =

Swedish composer (born 1959)

Tommie Haglund (born 15 January 1959) is a Swedish composer. He has composed chamber, choral, and orchestral music. His awards include the Christ Johnson Prize and H. M. The King's Medal.

== Biography ==
=== Early years ===
Haglund became interested in music during a long hospital stay at the age of seven in his hometown of Kalmar. Three years later he began studying harmony and music theory at the municipal music school in Kalmar. At that time the influence of Mozart was strong.

At the age of eleven, Haglund began composing a piece for harpsichord, strings and oboe. At the age of nineteen he moved to Halmstad, where he began studying music and composition with the guitar teacher Bo Strömberg. Through Strömberg, Haglund also discovered the composer John Dowland.

A few years later Haglund moved to England, where he was able to study with John Mills and Eric Fenby. During this time, his music began to be influenced by Frederick Delius.

=== Career ===
A stay in Denmark – at the Aarhus Conservatory of Music – ended with Haglund moving back to Halmstad. At this time he supported himself by working at Studiefrämjandet, where he led guitar study groups.

Around 1987 Haglund began a more extensive career as a composer. The following year, Haglund had something of a public breakthrough, through the performance of Intensio animi commissioned by Skandinaviska Swedenborgsällskapet (Scandinavian Swedenborg Society, Stockholm) to mark Emanuel Swedenborg's 300th birthday.

He has also taken composition lessons with Sven-Eric Johanson in Gothenburg.

The Tommie Haglund Festival has been held in Halmstad on three occasions, 2016, 2018 and 2022, focusing on Haglund's music.

In 2023, his first symphony was performed in Stockholm, in conjunction with The Composer's Weekend at the Stockholm Concert Hall. In connection with the commission for the Royal Philharmonic Orchestra, Haglund reunited with his old teacher Claes-Göran Bjerding from the music school in Kalmar, and his death shortly thereafter led to Haglund's creation and dedication of the symphony to him and Eric Fenby.

Haglund was the subject of an extended interview volume published in 2022 as the Swedish-language book Ögonblickets oändlighet: Samtal med Tommie Haglund [The Infinity of the Moment: Conversations with Tommie Haglund]. An English-language edition, Listening to Eternity: The Music, Spirituality, and Creative World of Composer Tommie Haglund, was published in 2025.

=== Recognition ===
Haglund has received, among other things, the Great Christ Johnson Prize and the H. M. The King's Medal. He has been described by the Stockholm Concert Hall and Royal Philharmonic Orchestra as "one of Scandinavia's most distinctive and visionary composers."

In a review for Seen and Heard International, Nick Barnard wrote of the performers at the 2018 Haglund Festival in Halmstad, saying, "The common link with all these performers was an admiration for Haglund’s unique and deeply personal music and their own exceptional musicianship and technical skills – two attributes absolutely vital to be able play these complex and ferociously demanding works."

== Work ==
=== Symphonies ===
- Symphony (2023, Gehrmans Musikförlag)

=== Concertos ===
- Cello Concerto, Flaminis Aura (2001, Gehrmans Musikförlag)
- Violin Concerto, Hymnen an die Nacht (2005, Gehrmans Musikförlag)
- Piano Concerto, Sempre la Luce (2026, Gehrmans Musikförlag)

=== Orchestra ===
- A Human in Paradise (2026)

=== Chamber orchestra ===
- Voces (Voices) for string orchestra, horns and percussion (1990)
- Elif for string orchestra (1992)
- Serenata per Diotima (Serenade for Diotima) for string orchestra (2014, Gehrmans Musikförlag)

=== Choir ===
- Min själ (My Soul) for chamber choir (1994)
- Kärlekshjärtan (Love Hearts), double canon for children's choir, string orchestra, piano and percussion (1996)
- Själens Helgedom (Sanctuary of the Soul), for mixed choir (2010)
- Auf Beethoven's schreibtishe mixed choir (2026)

=== Chamber music ===
- Notturno (Nocturne) for flute and guitar (1987)
- Voces (Voices) for Deceit (1990)
- Mirraggio (Mirage) for coloratura, violin, cello and piano (1992, Gehrmans Musikförlag)
- To the Sunset Breeze, in Memory of Frederick Delius for guitar, harp and string quartet (1997, Gehrmans Musikförlag)
- Il Regno degli Spiriti (Land of Souls) for string quartet (2001, Gehrmans Musikförlag)
- Stabat Mater Röstens dotter (Daughter of the Voice) for two sopranos, violin, cello, clarinet, harp, piano and percussion, commissioned for the 700th anniversary of Saint Bridget of Sweden (2003, Gehrmans Musikförlag)
- Voices of Light for octet (2006)
- Fragment for violin, clarinet and piano (2008)
- Sollievo (dopo la tempesta) (Solace After the Storm) for string trio (2013, Gehrmans Musikförlag)

=== Duos ===
- Intensio animi (Intensity of the Soul) for cello and piano (1988, Gehrmans Musikförlag)
- Fiori (Flowers) for cello and piano (1989)
- Inim-inim for violin and piano (1995)
- Fragile for flute and percussion (1996)
- Morgongåva (Morning Gift) for tenor and piano (2000)
- Varsamt Victoria sover (Gently, Victoria Is Sleeping) for flute and percussion (2001)
- Acedia for cello and double bass (2002)
- Stillhet (Stillness) for soprano and cello (2004)
- La Rosa Profunda for soprano and piano (2007)

=== Solo works ===
- Meditation for piano
- Meditation for organ (1990, Gehrmans Musikförlag)
- Meditation for viola or cello (1990, Gehrmans Musikförlag)
- L'infinito (Infinity) for violin (1991, Gehrmans Musikförlag)
- Spirarae celourum (Breathing of Heaven) for clavicino (1996)
- Arcana-Lacrimae (Secret of Tears) for piano (1998, Gehrmans Musikförlag)
- Insomnia for flute (2002)
- Bortom avsked (Beyond Farewell) for guitar (2004, Gehrmans Musikförlag)
- Cielo Notturno (Night Sky) for cello (2010, Gehrmans Musikförlag)
- Epilog till hymnen an die Nacht for solo violin (2010, Gehrmans Musikförlag)
- Passio Tessuto di sogni for organ (2015, Gehrmans Musikförlag)
- Fantasia - Raspberries in the Rain for piano (2025)

== Awards and honors ==
- 2003 – Swedish Music Association named Röstens dotter (Daughter of the Voice) the most significant serious work of the year
- 2014 – Stora Christ Johnson-priset (Christ Johnson Prize) for Flaminis Aura for cello and orchestra
- 2015 – H. M. The King's Medal of eighth size on a deep blue ribbon
