= Federico Nadi Terrade =

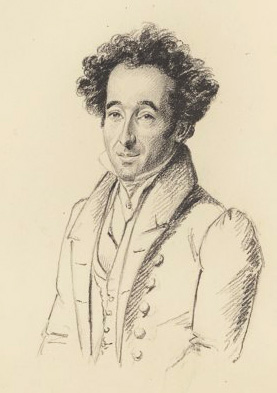
Federico Nadi Terrade. Drawing by Maria Röhl from 1834.

Federico Nadi Terrade (1740-1824) was an Italian ballet dancer. He was a ballet master of the Royal Swedish Ballet on the Royal Swedish Opera in Stockholm from 1804 to 1806.

| Preceded by Filippo Taglioni | Director of the Royal Swedish Ballet; 1804–1806 | Succeeded by Louis Deland |
