= Gustaf Åbergsson =

Swedish stage director and actor (1775–1852)

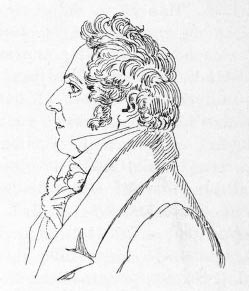
- Died: 20 July 1852; Jakob and Johannes parish
- Resting place: Norra begravningsplatsen
- Spouse(s): Carolina Kuhlman

Gustaf Fredrik Åbergsson née Åberg (27 March 1775 – 20 July 1852) was a Swedish stage actor, theatre director and principal of the Royal Dramatic Training Academy. He is one of the leading actors in Swedish theatre history.

== Background ==
Gustav Åbergsson was born to Jonas Åberg, footman at the royal court, and Fredrika Maria Svahn. His father is thought to have been the son of Beata Sabina Straas, the first professional native actress in Sweden to perform on a public stage in 1737, although this is unconfirmed.

=== Stage career ===
He was a student at the French Theatre of Gustav III in Bollhuset in 1786, as was his sister Inga According to popular legend, King Gustav III of Sweden originally placed him as a student in the Opera after having seen him in the park of Drottningholm Palace: after discovering that they shared the same name, the king asked him to sing a song. Gustav did so and blew kisses to the audience after, and the king had kissed him on his forehead.

He made his debut on the Royal Dramatic Theatre in 1788, but performed on the Stenborg Theatre until he was finally given a contract at the royal theatre in 1798. He changed his surname from Åberg to Åbergsson, because he wanted to avoid being connected to his sister, actress and opera singer, Inga Åberg (1773–1837).

Gustav Åbergsson was described as beautiful, with a fine figure, posture and grace and an easy manner, and was often given hero- and lover parts: "roles, which demands a beautiful body and pleasantness". He had an easy and refined way of acting and reportedly pleased the audience "By his attractive figure, his true way of acting and his refined manners."

He made many study trips to Paris. In 1812, he was made prefect of the dramatic stage.

In 1819, he and his spouse played the leading parts in Romeo and Juliet, the first time this play was performed in Stockholm (though it had been performed in Norrköping in 1776).

In 1820–1823, he was director of the Segerlind Theatre in Gothenburg. After this, he was instructor, and from 1828–1831, headmaster of the Royal Dramatic Training Academy. He retired in 1834.

=== Private life ===
He was married to the ballet dancer Margaretha Christina Hallongren (d. 1810) in 1793, and had a relationship with the star actress Carolina Kuhlman (1778–1866) for several years before they married in 1815. Åbergsson was buried at Norra begravningsplatsen outside Stockholm.

== Other sources ==
- Nordensvan, Georg, Svensk teater och svenska skådespelare från Gustav III till våra dagar. Förra delen, 1772-1842, Bonnier, Stockholm, 1917 ['Swedish theatre and Swedish actors from Gustav III to our days. First book 1772–1842'] (in Swedish)
- Torsten Dahl, Svenska män och kvinnor, nr 8
