= Stora Teatern =

Musical theatre in Gothenburg, Sweden

Coordinates: 57°42′9″N 11°58′14″E

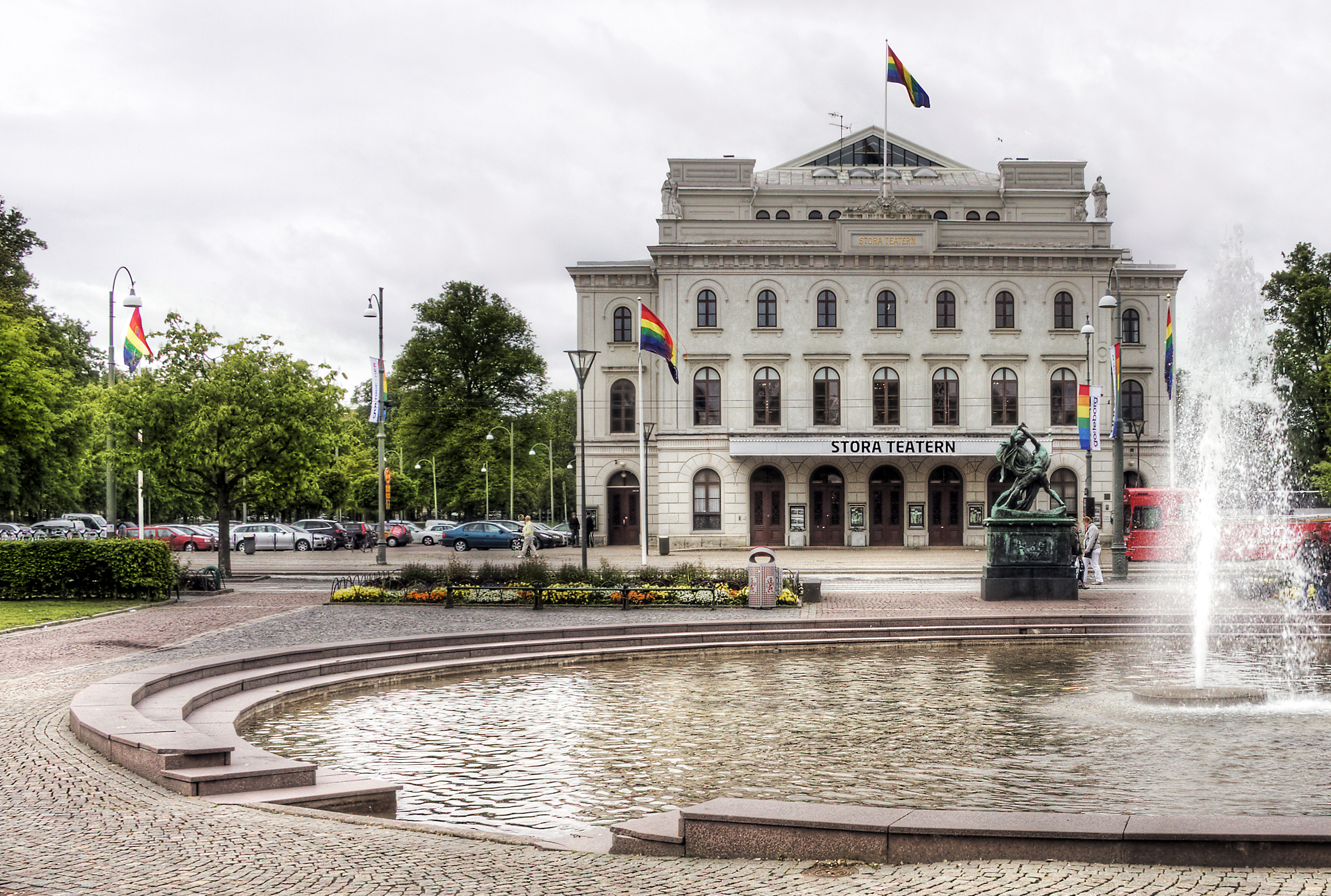
Stora Teatern

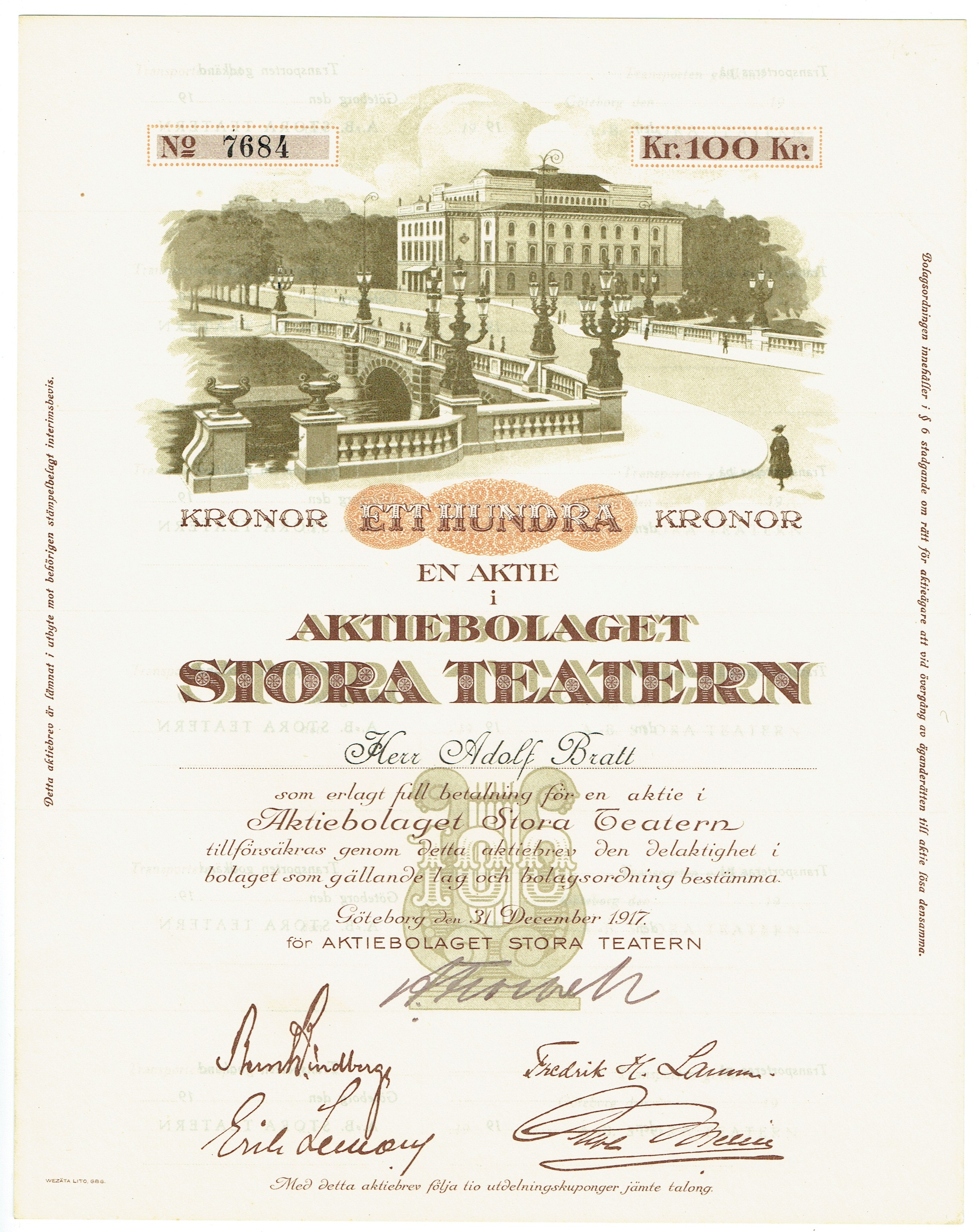
Share of the AB Stora Teatern, issued 31 December 1917

Stora Teatern (popularly known as Storan) is a musical theater in the Lorensberg district of Gothenburg, Sweden. Inaugurated in 1859, it is situated in Kungsparken park south of Kungsportsplatsen.

== History ==
The theater was originally founded to replace the Segerlindska teatern, and as such was known as Nya Theatern ('New Theatre') until 1880. The thirty-meter-high theater was inaugurated on September 15, 1859. During the first 60 years, this was mainly a dramatic theater featuring opera and operetta. In 1916, Stora Teatern became primarily a lyrical theater.

On 17 March 2003, a lease agreement was signed between KIGAB (a company in the Higab group) and the Swedish Artists' and Musicians' Association (SAMI), which gradually extended until 2023, with the possibility of extension. KIGAB had the interior of the building renovated for SEK 60 million and created a number of concert, party and conference rooms as well as a restaurant which since 2008 has been known as Grill Del Mundo. During the renovation, the building was also equipped with a recording studio, named Top Floor Studios, home to engineer and producer Jakob Herrmann. The studio can record live performances from two of Storan's three stages. Since its reopening in 2003, SAMI has been running concert, conference and restaurant activities in the building.

== Other sources ==
- Pettersson, Åke (1992) Teaterliv i Göteborg (Göteborg: Göteborgs-Posten) ISBN 91-7029-102-0
- Persson, Jörgen; Rising Anders (1993) Göteborg bakom fasaderna (Stockholm: Svenska turistfören) ISBN 91-7156-114-5
- Rosen, Astrid von (2008) Poul Kanneworff och modernismen på Stora teatern i Göteborg (Göteborg: Göteborgs stadsmuseum) ISBN 978-91-85488-96-4
