= Johan von Blanc =

French actor in Sweden

Johan von Blanc, born Michel Le Blanc (1738 in France – 21 January 1796 in Karlskrona, Sweden), was a French actor and acrobat active in Sweden. He was the leader of the travelling theater Gemenasiska Sällskapet ('Gemenasian Company'), and the director of the first permanent theater in Gothenburg, Comediehuset, between 1780-86. He played a major role in the history of Gothenburg as well as the theater in Sweden outside Stockholm.
