= Segerlindska teatern =

Segerlind Theatre
- Segerlindska teatern
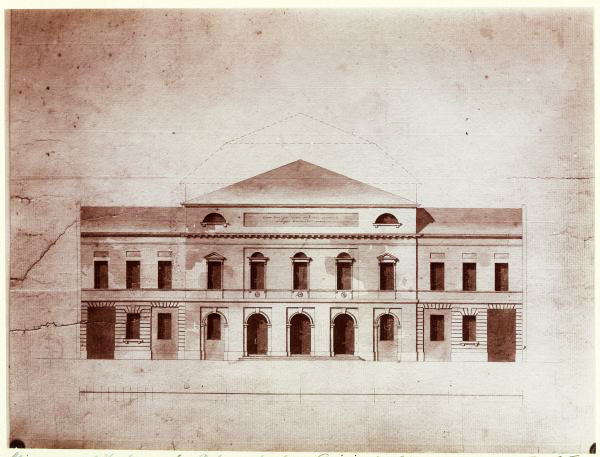
- Drawing of the theatre, circa 1814
- Former names: Nya teatern, Stora teatern, Mindre teatern
- Alternative names: Teatern vid Södra Hamngatan

General information
- Architectural style: Empire
- Location: Gothenburg, Västra Götaland, Sweden
- Completed: 1816
- Demolished: 1892; 134 years ago
- Owner: Laurentius Segerlind

Technical details
- Material: Brick, plaster

Design and construction
- Architect: Jonas Hagberg

Segerlindska teatern ('Segerlind Theatre') was a theater in Gothenburg, active between 1816 and 1892. It was also known as Nya teatern ('New Theatre'), Stora teatern ('Grand Theatre') and (after the foundation of the Grand Theatre) as Mindre teatern ('Little Theatre').

The theatre was constructed as a replacement of the old Comediehuset, which was by then considered too decrepit. It was financed by the wealthy Laurentius Segerlind and designed by Jonas Hagberg. Influenced by the building of the Royal Swedish Opera in Stockholm, it had was situated by the street Södra Hamngatan and had room for 1 269 spectators. The theatre was inaugurated on 12 August 1816 by the theater company of Johan Anton Lindqvist, which had moved there from the Comediehuset. The theatre was mostly used by travelling theatre companies rather than having a permanent staff. Attempts were made to create a permanent theatre by Johan Anton Lindqvist (1816-20) and Gustaf Åbergsson (1820-23). By 1859, the building was considered to old and the Grand Theatre was built to replace it. The building was used as a concert house until 1864, when it was again inaugurated as a theatre. This time, however, it had been redesigned and was reduced, with room for only 500 spectators. The theatre was burnt down in 1892.
