= Johan Anton Lindqvist =

Swedish stage actor and theater director

Johan Anton Lindqvist (25 December 1759 - 17 September 1833) was a Swedish stage actor and theater director.

== Biography ==
Lindqvist was born at Ystad, Sweden. He was active in the theater party of Carl Seuerling in 1788. He was the director of the Lindqvist theater Company in 1793-1820. He played an important role in Swedish theater life outside of Stockholm, being the leader of one of the largest theater companies in Sweden. Lindqvist and his company maintained the operations of the theatres in Gothenburg. He was the director of the theatres Comediehuset (1796-1800 and 1810–16) and Segerlindska teatern (1816–20) during the attempts to make them permanent theatres. He died in Gothenburg in 1833.

== Other sources ==
- Schöldström, Birger (1889). Seuerling och hans "comædietroupp" : ett blad ur svenska landsortsteaterns historia. Stockholm. Libris 281714
- Wilhelm Berg: Anteckningar om Göteborgs äldre teatrar / Band 1. 1690-1794 (1896-1900)
- Wilhelm Berg: Anteckningar om Göteborgs äldre teatrar / Band 2. 1794-1816 (1896-1900)
