= Louis Deland =

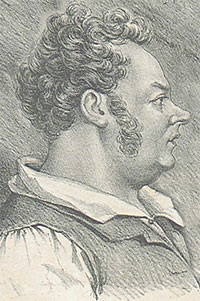
Louis Deland

Louis Joseph Marie Deland (25 April 1772 – 15 April 1823) was a Swedish ballet dancer, singer, actor, choreographer and ballet master in the Royal Swedish Ballet. He is often considered the first native male star in the Royal Swedish Ballet.

== Life and career ==
Louis Deland was the son of Louise-Antoine Deland from Luxembourg, the hairdresser, parfumeuse, and footman of the Swedish queen, Sophia Magdalena of Denmark. He was the brother of the violinist Jean Pierre Deland.

He debuted on the stage of the Royal Swedish Opera in Stockholm in the ballet to the opera Orphée at the age of ten. He impressed the king Gustav III of Sweden, who sent him to be educated at the ballet of Paris in France, by the famous Gardel.

=== Career at the Royal Ballet ===
In 1792, he returned to Sweden, where he had his homecoming performance in Armide 9 January, and was hired as premier dancer at the Royal Swedish Opera and at the Royal Dramatic Theatre.

He was soon considered the most notable male dancer in the country. He also had a beautiful voice and was considered very good in comical parts, and his interaction in the plays with Lars Hjortsberg and Carl Schylander were widely admired. He was considered to be a natural talent, who became one with his part. He was said to have a feeling of "childlike loveliness" to his appearance, which he kept through his life.

Among his parts were Niklas in Tanddoktorn (The Dentist) by Åhlström, Husca in Karavanen (The Caravane) by Gretry, Räfklo in Målaren och modellerna (Painter and Models) by Bouilly, Pierrot in Den talande tavlan (Speaking painting) by Gretry and Crispin in Den föregifna skatten (The Supposed Treasure).

In 1803, he was appointed ballet master of the Royal Swedish Ballet and in 1809 as first dancing master, a position he kept until 1820, with a brief interruption in 1816–1818.

He also composed pantomimeballets, character dances and other entertainments.

Louis Delands retired when at the age of forty, he suffered a condition which made him lose his memory. His place was in many ways filled by Per Erik Sevelin.

=== Private life ===
Deland was married twice, first to the actor Carolina Kuhlman and, after a divorce, to the actor Maria Rebecka Rydberg. He was the father of the feminist Josefina Deland. The Deland family became a well known theatre family. Louis Deland's nephews, Pierre Deland and Fredrik Deland were known actors: the former director of the Deland troupe and Djurgårdsteatern, and Pierre's daughter, was actor Betty Deland, vice principal of the Royal Dramatic Training Academy.

Preceded by Federico Nadi Terrade	Director of the Royal Swedish Ballet; 1806–1816	Succeeded by Filippo Taglioni
Preceded by Filippo Taglioni	Director of the Royal Swedish Ballet; 1818–1820	Succeeded by André Isidore Carey
