= Comediehuset =

Theatre in Gothenburg, Sweden

- Sillgateteatern
- Address: Gothenburg; Sweden
- Designation: Sillgatan

Construction
- Opened: 1779
- Closed: 1833
- Years active: 1779-1833

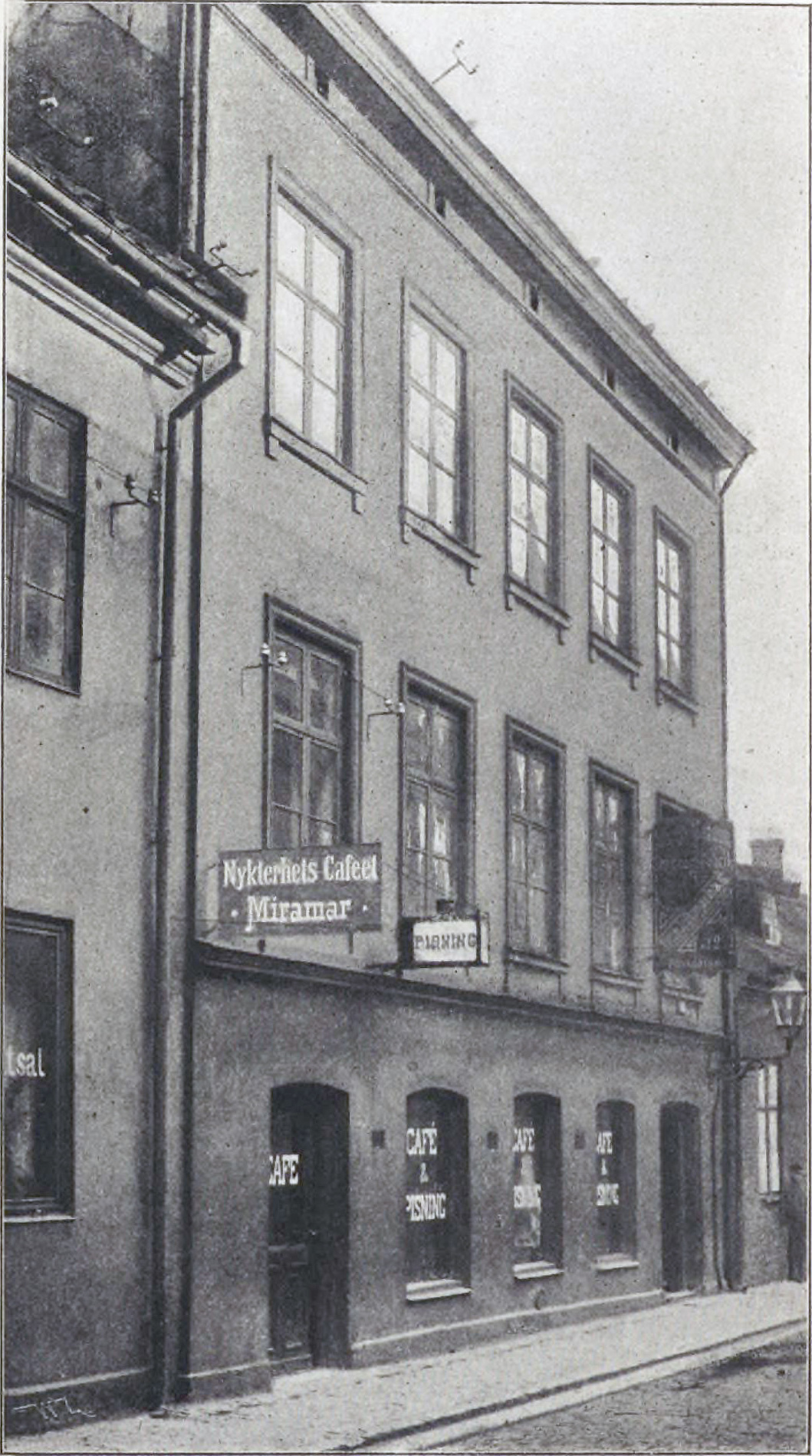
The former Sillgate Theatre building, 1898

Comediehuset (The Comedy House) or Sillgateteatern (The Herring-Street Theatre) was a Swedish theatre, active in Gothenburg from 1779 until 1833. It was the first permanent Public theatre in Gothenburg and the only one until 1816. It was located at the corner of Sillgatan, the Herring-street (now Postgatan) and Nedre Kvarnbergsgatan.

== History ==
=== Background ===
Prior to the foundation of the first theater, travelling theatre companies had visited Gothenburg, the first one being recorded in 1696. They were foreign, usually from Germany, but by the 1750s, the Swedish theater company of Peter Lindahl regularly visited the town. During the 1770s, amateur theater became popular among the wealthy city elite due to the theater interest of Gustav III of Sweden, and the family of Alströmer and Hall staged amateur theater and became patrons of theater.

In about 1775, Patrik Alströmer and his brother Clas Alströmer, had a proper theater building constructed, known as the Comedy House. Originally of wood, it was rebuilt in stone in 1782. This was to become the 4th public theater in Sweden, after Björngårdsteatern (1640) and Bollhuset (1667) in Stockholm, and the second outside of the capital, after Egges teater in Norrköping (1762), and prior to Spektakelhuset in Karlskrona and Spektakelhuset in Gävle (both founded in 1784). This was a part of a great enthusiasm and development of the theatre had begun in the country after King Gustav III of Sweden had founded the Royal Swedish Opera in 1773. Many theaters were founded in smaller cities around Sweden in the 18th-century, but Comediehuset was one of few to have success enough to last past a few years.

=== Permanent theatre ===
It is not exactly known when the theater was first used. Likely, it was used by travelling theater companies from the start. From 1779, however, the building was used by the theater company Gemenasiska sällskapet. It was managed by, in succession, Johan von Blanc (1779-86); Gustaf Simson (1786-87) and finally by Lovisa Simson (1787-92) in companionship with Andreas Widerberg (1786-90).

The standard of the Comediehuset was considered high. The theater's outside the capital was not as closely guarded by the authorities, and controversial plays often had premier sooner in Gothenburg, Karlskrona and Norrköping earlier than in Stockholm. The Marriage of Figaro had its premier in Sweden in Comediehuset in 1786, and Hamlet in 1787, much sooner than in the Royal Dramatic Theatre in Stockholm. Comediehuset also arranged public masquerade balls, concerts, opera and ballet, and had its own restaurant. Travelling guests artists also performed there, often foreign, such as French pantomime artists, Italian Opera and English circus artists.

=== Later history ===
In 1792, the theater was dissolved. However, it continued to be used by travelling theater companies. From 1793 until 1800, it was used by the company of Johan Anton Lindqvist, during which it in effect continued as a permanent theater. The following years, it was temporarily used by a succession of theater companies.

From 1810 until 1816, it was again permanently used by Johan Anton Lindqvist, until the building was deemed unsuitable and Lindqvist moved his theater to the second theater in Gothenburg, the newly established Segerlindska teatern (1816–1892), which was also called Stora teatern and Mindre teatern (from 1864), which in its turn was replaced by Stora Teatern, founded in 1859.

After repairs, Comediehuset was temporarily used for some performances until it was closed in 1833. The empty building burnt down 13 March 1867.
