= Kungliga svenska skådeplatsen =

First Swedish-language theatre company

Kungliga svenska skådeplatsen ('Royal Swedish Stage') or Svenska Komedien ('Swedish Comedy') was a Swedish Theatre, active between 1737 and 1754 and housed in the Stora Bollhuset in Stockholm. It was the first national stage in Sweden, and the first professional Swedish language theater, staffed with professional Swedish language actors, in Sweden. It was the first stage to have performed theater, opera and ballet by Swedish actors, singers and dancers to the public. In 1753, the French language Du Londel Troupe was engaged by the queen, Louisa Ulrika of Prussia, and after having shared the stage for the season of 175s-54, the Swedish language actors where turned out of the building and split in two travelling theater companies, one of whom was the Stenborg Company.

== Members ==
This was the first Swedish troupe; it performed both opera and drama, and it also contained the first Swedish dancers, though the names are sadly often missing.

- Johan Bergholtz (d. 1774)
- Christian Berner, (1702–1773), dancer.
- Johanna Catharina Embeck
- Margareta Maria Fabritz, (1716–1800), one of the first Swedish-speaking actresses, mother of Margareta Seuerling.
- Nils Flodell, (1714–1759).
- Anna Maria Göttling
- Anders Hallberg, (b. 1722)
- Kristian Knöppel, (1717–1800), dramatic.
- Peter Lindahl, (1712–1792), comic and director.
- Johan Ohl, (1704–1766), singer and musician.
- Johan Palmberg, (1713–1781)
- Brita Christina Schenbom
- Petter Stenborg, (1719–1781), one of the first Swedish-speaking actors, star.
- Beata Sabina Straas, (d. 1773), the first native actress in Sweden.
- Elisabeth Lillström, (born 1717), one of Sweden's first professional actresses, prima donna, mother of Elisabeth Olin.
