= Johanna Löfblad =

Swedish stage actress

- Born: Johanna Catharina Enbeck/Enbäck; 1733; Sweden
- Died: 14 September 1811 (age 78); Stockholm, Sweden
- Other names: Johanna Enbeck, Johanna Gentschein, Mamsell Enbeck, Madame Gentschein, Madame Löfblad
- Spouse(s): Magnus Gentschein, Jean Löfblad

Johanna Catharina Löfblad née Embeck or Enbäck (1733 – 14 September 1811), also known as Madame Gentschein and Madame Löfblad, was a Swedish stage actress. She was a member of the pioneer group of actors in the first Swedish national theatre of Bollhuset.

== Life ==
The origin of Johanna Löfblad does not seem to be known. Her original named was Embeck or Enbäck.

=== Bollhuset ===
Johanna Embeck made her debut at the Swedish national Opera Theatre in Bollhuset in Stockholm in the 1747–48 season as the nymph Chlorix in the opera comique Syrinx by Peter Lindahl or Lars Lalin with music by Johan Ohl, opposite Elisabeth Lillström (Syrinx), Peter Lindahl (Harlequin), Petter Stenborg (Philemon), Trundman (Sylvanus) and Elisabeth Olin (Astrild).

She was one of the stars of the actors of the theater, which was the first and only Swedish language theater, founded only ten years prior to her debut. She was a member of the board of twelve directors which was formed by the actors themselves to manage the theater, and one of four women directors alongside Elisabeth Lillström, Maria Margareta Fabritz and Sophia Catharina Murman.

During the last years of her career at the theater prior to its closure in 1754, she was known under the name Madame Gentschein after her marriage to the custom official Magnus Gentschein.

=== Stenborg Company ===
After the season of 1753-54, the Swedish theater lost its permission to use the royal Bollhuset theater building, which was transferred to the use of the French Du Londel theater by king Adolph Frederick of Sweden and queen Louisa Ulrika. The Swedish language theater split in two travelling Swedish theater companies: the company of Peter Lindahl and Johan Bergholtz, and the Stenborg Company of Petter Stenborg, which became the first two Swedish language theater companies in Sweden. Löfblad initially joined the Lindahl-Bergholtz Company, but this company did not last long, and she joined the Stenborg Company in 1758.

Johanna Löfblad became a leading member of the Stenborg Company, which was the only Swedish language theater until the 1780s and performed not only in the capital of Stockholm and the Swedish countryside but also (from 1761) in Finland, where it was the first professional theater ever to have performed.

In 1760, she divorced Magnus Gentschein and remarried her colleague Jean Löfblad (1728–1774), the male star and Harlequin actor of the Stenborg Company, and became known to the audience as Madame Löfblad.

Jean and Johanna Löfblad were the male and female star of the Stenborg Company, a status which is illustrated by their contracts, in which they are both given terms more privileged than the other members of the acting troupe but equal to each others: other than them, only Catharina Lindberg and Anders Hagendorf was given written contracts.

From the 1760 contract, they were also allowed to occasionally make their own tours, in a smaller scale, with their own acting company and a puppet theater on the Stenborg theater privilege, and in 1768, Petter Stenborg sued Jean Löfblad for having broken the terms of his contract by not sharing the profit made by the tours of him and his spouse in the Stenborg privilege. The 1768 case provides an unusual insight into the inner life of the Stenborg Company. Petter Stenborg claimed that Jean Löfblad hid the profit "with all kinds of cunning" even though Stenborg "allowed his [Löfblad's] wife to lift her salary even during her childbirths, in accordance with the contract and in acknowledgement to her talents, but still she is just as difficult to deal with as her husband, who is even so powerful as to influence his wife..." Stenborg won the case but the Löfblad couple still remained in his troupe, being the stars among his actors.

In 1774 Johanna Löfblad was widowed when her spouse died unexpectedly while getting ready for a performance, and a performance was given to her benefit "as a support for her in her poor condition."

She continued to be active in the Stenborg Company when they performed in the Humlegårdsteatern in Stockholm between 1773 and 1780.

=== Later career ===
By the time the Stenborg Company finally found a permanent theater building in the Eriksbergsteatern in Stockholm in 1780, she was no longer given main parts in the plays, but was still a popular actress, now used mostly in the numerous supporting roles of old women. She continued with this when the Stenborg Company moved in to the Stenborg Theatre in 1784.

When the Det besynnerliga spektaklet ('Odd Spectacle') was arranged by the dramatic Didrik Björn in the season of 1790-91, in which the actors of the theater expressed their appreciation of the audience in the shape of their most popular roles, Johanna Löfblad did so in the character of Gertrud from Njugg spar, a role she had first made in the 1784–85 season.

Johanna Löfblad retired after the 1795-96 season, after having had the longest career of all the actors of the original national theater of Bollhuset, as well as any other 18th-century Swedish actor, male or female. She had her own apartment in the building of the Stenborg Theater and was apparently supported by Carl Stenborg. In 1799, however, the Stenborg Theater was closed and Carl Stenborg himself countered economic troubles, and she lived her last years in a poor house in Stockholm, where she died.
