= Hedvig Wigert =

Swedish opera singer

Hedvig Christina Wigert née Falk (February 1748 – 4 January 1780) was a Swedish opera singer. She belonged to the pioneer generation of performers of the Royal Swedish Opera.

Hedvig Falk belonged to the first group of singers hired at the foundation of the Royal Swedish Opera in Bollhuset in 1773. She was at that point known for her musical talent and referred to as "one for her musical talent already well-known female", and Gustav III wanted her for the part of the goddess Doris in the opening grand opera Thetis och Pélée, an opera in Swedish composed by Francesco Uttini with words by Johan Wellander, which was to be performed at the inauguration of the new Opera.

The employment of Wigert illustrates social and gender related issues. There was an initial difficulty to enroll female singers because the profession had a low status in the 18th-century. Wigert also illustrate the fact that people from the upper class participated in the Opera project of the king. Similar to the case of Elisabeth Olin, Wigert was a member of the upper class, and though she herself was willing to participate, her employment was delayed by the disapproval of "Two old powder-witches" in her family. Eventually, she was given a contract which stipulated that she would be allowed to resign whenever her family wished her to, as long as she participated in the inauguration performance.

After Doris in Thetis och Pélée, in the inauguration performance of the Opera 18 January 1773, (where she played opposite Carl Stenborg (Pélée), Elisabeth Olin (Thetis), Lars Lalin (Jupiter), Anders Nordén (Neptune), Nils Gustav Stenborg (Mercury), (Elisabeth) Betty Olin (Amor) and Hans Björkman and Johan Filip Lising). She continued to play "many demanding parts". Among her parts where performed some theatre parts, during a period when the Opera offered this. Her best remembered part was the title role of Mérope by Voltaire in the 1777–78 season after her marriage, where according to the papers, she "was given lively approval" by the audience. Other roles was Corinna in Acis and Galathea by Händel, and Euridyce in Oprpheus by Gluck. She was described as unanimously admired, with a "noble" and versatile way of acting.

She married the cashier Gustaf Wigert in 1776.
