= Elisabeth Lillström =

Swedish opera singer

- Born: Elisabeth Söderman; 1717; Sweden
- Died: 4 April 1791 (age 74); Sweden
- Other names: Elise Lillström, Lisa Lillström, Madame Lillström.
- Spouse: Petter Lillström

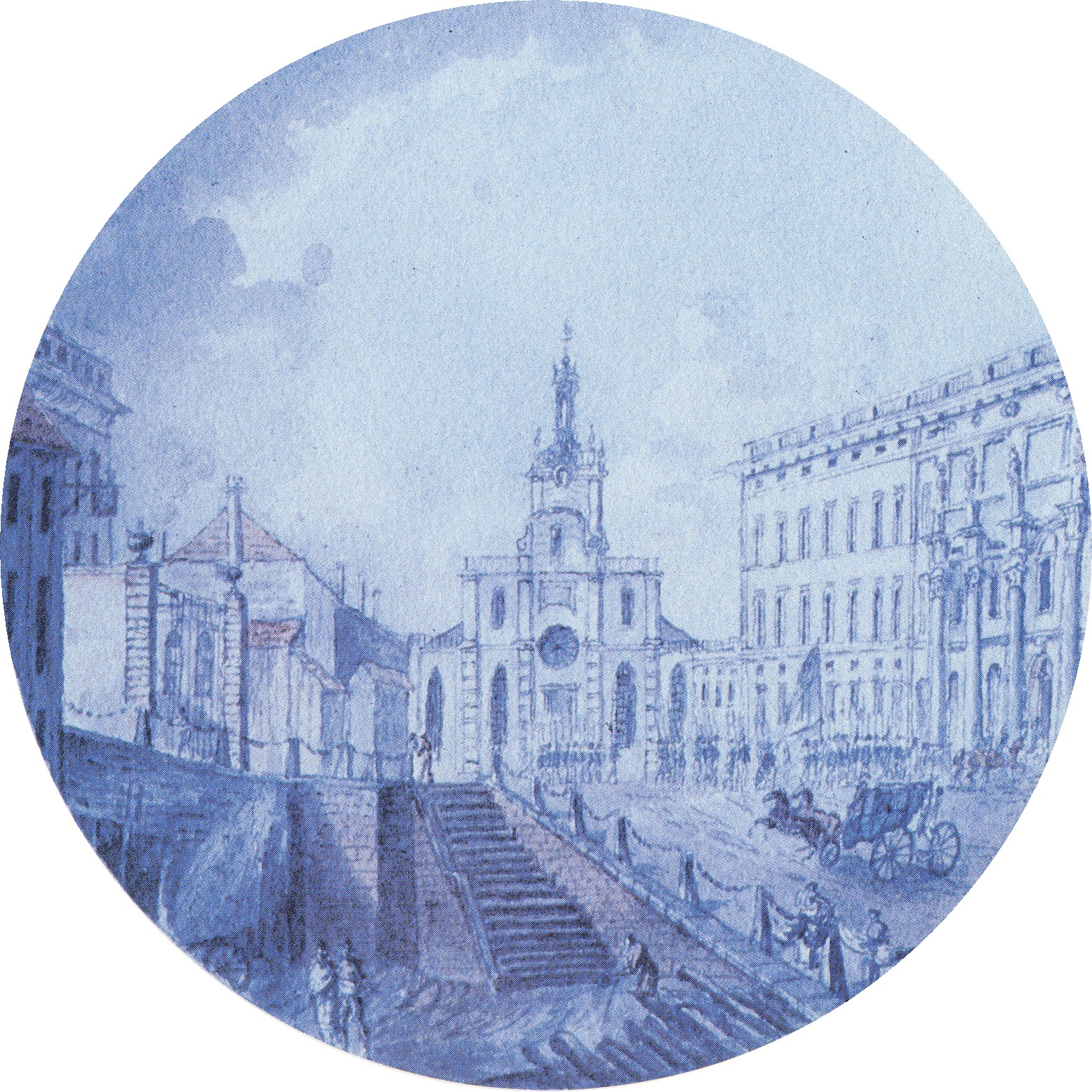
Bollhuset at Slottsbacken in Stockholm during the 1780s. From right to left: Stockholm Palace, Storkyrkan, Bollhuset Theatre and the Tessin Palace. Drawing, Martin Rudolf Heland.

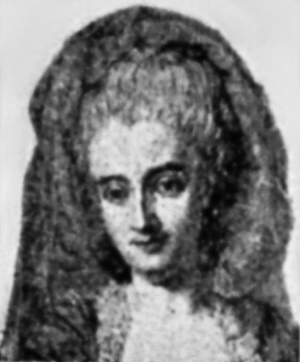
Elisabeth Olin, the daughter of Elisabeth Lillström.

Elisabeth Lillström née Söderman (1717 – 4 April 1791) was a Swedish stage actress and opera singer. She was one of the first professional actresses in Sweden and a member of the pioneer generation of Kungliga svenska skådeplatsen, the first national theater in Bollhuset in Stockholm, where she was one of the most prominent members. She was the mother of Elisabeth Olin.

== Life ==
The parentage of Elisabeth Lillström does not seem to be known. Her original surname is however known to be Söderman. She married the musician Petter Lillström (1714–1776), who is confirmed to be a member of the orchestra of the Bollhuset theater from at least 1744 onward (later as its conductor).

=== Early career ===
Elisabeth Lillström's employment at the theater illustrate the first beginning of the first professional actresses in Sweden. In 1737, the first professional Swedish language theater was inaugurated under royal patronage in the theater building at Bollhuset, which had until then only housed temporary foreign theater companies, which necessitated the creation of the pioneer group of native Swedish actors, composed, according to the British ambassador Edward Finch of "students, clerks and lady's maids." In Sweden, there was never any opposition to women performing onstage, and the first actresses, Beata Sabina Straas, "Miss Wijkman" and "Miss Lund" was engaged for the inauguration performance the same year. Straas, Wijkman and Lund where all retired by 1739, and there was a need to employ more permanent actresses, and in 1741, the theater lists its actresses as Anna Maria Sualing, Anna Lindbohm, Susanna Catharina Steenberg and Elisabeth Lillström.

Elisabeth Lillström was one of the stars of the actors of the theater, which was the first and the only Swedish language theater at the time, and often played the lead female role in the productions. She was a member of the board of twelve directors which was formed by the most prominent actors themselves to manage the theater after it became a private theater in 1740, and one of four women directors alongside Johanna Löfblad, Maria Margareta Fabritz and Sophia Catharina Murman.

Her roles are mostly unknown, which is the case also with the rest of the actors. The activity of the first national stage in Sweden is poorly documented and the casting lists for the plays are often missing. The theater is known to have performed not only dramatic theater but also operatic plays and ballet, creating not only the first native actors but also opera singers and ballet dancers - whose identity, however, is mostly unknown. Elisabeth Lillström was a part of this diversity, and though never formally referred to as an opera singer, she was a soprano and frequently used in singing parts as well as theatre plays, and played an important part as an acting singer.

In the 1747–48 season, Elisabeth Lillström starred in the main role of the nymph Syrinx in Syrinx by Lars Lalin or Peter Lindahl with music by Johan Ohl, opposite Peter Lindahl (as Harlequin), Johanna Embeck (Chlorix), Petter Stenborg (Philemon), Trundman (Sylvanus) and her daughter Elisabeth Olin (Astrild), which is known as the first Swedish opera comique. She also starred in the leading role of the Den straffade förmätenheten eller Arachne hvilken blifver förvandlad i en spindel ('Punished impudence or Archne enchanted within a spider') by Lars Lalin (1750–51) as well as in the Menlöshetens tempel ('Sanctuary of Pointlessness') by Peter Lindahl (1749–50), also with her daughter. She was the furthermore the beneficiary of these three performances, a privilege given only to the elite members of the theater.

=== Later career ===
After the season of 1753–54, the Swedish theater lost its permission to use the royal Bollhuset theater building, which was transferred to the use of the French Du Londel theater by king Adolph Frederick of Sweden and queen Louisa Ulrika. The Swedish language theater split in two travelling Swedish theater companies: the company of Peter Lindahl and Johan Bergholtz, and the Stenborg Company of Petter Stenborg, which became the first two Swedish language theater companies in Sweden.

Elisabeth Lillström joined the Stenborg Company, which performed in various locals in the city of Stockholm and in Finland: her spouse was engaged as an organist in the Katarina Church in Stockholm until 1770, but he is also listed as the musician of the theater company, which is interpreted to mean that he was active in the theater only during its performances in Stockholm.

Her later career is not given as much attention. In 1761 and 1762, the Stenborg troupe was given permission to perform Swedish plays at Bollhuset for the benefit of the husband of Elisabeth Lillström: on 4 December 1770, Elisabeth Lillström played Salmonea in the tragedy Maccabeerne in Bollhuset, again to the benefit of her husband, who also composed the music.

In 1770, three of the members of the pioneer group of Swedish actors in the first Swedish theater of Bollhuset was publicly praised "for their valuable contributions to the nation and to themselves, which has given hope of the Art of Acting in Sweden": these three were Peter Palmberg, Kristian Knöppel and Elisabeth Lillström.

The daughter of Elisabeth Lillström, Elisabeth Olin, who debuted as a child actor by the side of her mother in Syrinx in 1747, became a notable concert-singer in the 1750s, and the first opera prima donna of the Royal Swedish Opera upon its foundation in 1773.

== See also ==
- Johanna Löfblad
