= Maria Katarina Öhrn =

Swedish actress and singer

Maria Katarina Öhrn or Maria Katarina Berlin (c. 1756 – 8 November 1783 in Stockholm) was a Swedish stage actress and singer. She was active at the Stenborg Troupe in Humlegårdsteatern from 1776–80 and in Eriksbergsteatern in 1780–83. During her career, she was one of the most popular stars on the Swedish stage as the female star of the Stenborg theatre, at that time the leading dramatic stage, prior to the founding of the Royal Dramatic Theatre.

== Life ==
In 1776, she was noted as one of the new members of the Stenborg company: "the 20 year old actress mamsell Öhrn proved herself to be a true profit for the theatre and was soon given the appreciation of the audience, who saw the advantages in the art of acting, by which she raised above all her female colleagues in the troupe". She married Isak Berlin, a minor functionary of the royal court, in 1780, and thereby became known under her new name Berlin.

She was the star at the inauguration of the Eriksbergsteatern (Eriksberg Theatre) in 1780 and "became the favorite of the audience through her pleasant personality and stage ability". She performed in dramatic plays and as well as a singer when the theatre offered operatic performances. She was titled "First Actress" in 1782, when she was granted the income from a performance, a privilege significant for star actors and also afforded the male star of the theatre, Magnus Bonn.

Possibly her most famous part was Perette in the operetta De båda jägarna och mjölkflickan ("The two hunters and the milking maid") opposite Magnus Bonn (Vilhelm) and Anders Lundberg (Colas) in 1780. Originally a French play, it was performed by the Du Londel Troupe at Bollhuset in 1765, but was now, for the first time, performed in the Swedish language. It was a great success and continued running for eighteen years, until 1798.

She died of a "consuming fever" four days after her spouse died of tuberculosis. Her inventory was written up by her sister-in-law Maria Helena Berlin and Johanna Catharina Enbeck, and has been quoted as an example of the wardrobe of an actress of her time. Her position at the theatre was reportedly taken up by Christina Rahm.
