= 1773 in music =

== Events ==
- January 18 – The first opera performance in the Swedish language, Thetis and Phelée, starring Carl Stenborg, Elisabeth Olin and Hedvig Wigert in Bollhuset in Stockholm, Sweden, marks the establishment of the Royal Swedish Opera.
- February – Joseph Leutgeb tours Italy with Leopold and Wolfgang Amadeus Mozart.
- May 28 – The opera Alceste by Anton Schweitzer with German language libretto by poet Christoph Martin Wieland is premièred by the Seyler Theatre Company at the Hoftheater Weimar, pioneering a German operatic style.
- June 24 - Premiere of the ballet Adele de Ponthieu by Josef Starzer at the Burgtheater in Vienna.
- July 14 – Wolfgang Amadeus Mozart and his father Leopold go to Vienna in search of work but are unsuccessful and return in September to Salzburg where the family move from Wolfgang's birthplace in Getreidegasse to the Tanzmeisterhaus in Makartplatz.
- Composer James Hook vacates his post at Marylebone Gardens in London.

== Opera ==
- Pasquale Anfossi – Demofoonte
- Domenico Cimarosa – La finta parigina
- Joseph Haydn – L'infedeltà delusa; Philemon und Baucis
- Andrea Luchesi – L'Inganno Scoperto, overo Il Conte Caramella (libretto by Carlo Goldoni)
- Josef Mysliveček
  - Demetrio, ED.10:D15
  - Romolo ed Ersilia, ED.10:G6
- Giovanni Paisiello – Il tamburo, R.1.37
- Anton Schweitzer – Alceste (libretto by Christoph Martin Wieland)

== Ballet ==
- Josef Starzer - Adele de Pontieu

== Classical music ==
- Carl Friedrich Abel – 6 Symphonies, Op. 10
- Johann Albrechtsberger – Concerto for Harp in C major
- Samuel Arnold – The Prodigal Son (oratorio)
- Johann Christian Bach – 3 Symphonies, Op. 9
- Jean-Baptiste Canavas – 6 Cello Sonatas, Op. 2
- Christian Cannabich – 6 String Trios, Op. 3
- Carl Ditters von Dittersdorf – La Liberatrice del Popolo Giudaico nella Persia, o sia l’Esther (oratorio)
- Jean-Louis Duport – 6 Cello Sonatas, Op. 3
- Ernst Eichner – 6 Symphonies, Op. 7
- Felice Giardini – 6 String Trios, Op. 17
- Wolfgang Amadeus Mozart
  - String Quartet No.7 in E-flat major, K.160/159a
  - Exsultate, jubilate, K.165/158a
  - Viennese Quartets, String Quartets No. 8-13, K. 168–173
  - Symphony No. 23 in D major, K. 181/162b
  - Symphony No. 24 in B-flat major, K. 182/173dA
  - Symphony No. 25 in G minor, K. 183/173dB
- Johann Christoph Oley – Jesus meine Zuversicht
- Gaetano Pugnani – 6 Violin Sonatas, Op. 8
- Giovanni Battista Sammartini – Six String Quintets
- Joseph Bologne Saint-Georges
  - 6 String Quartets, Op. 1
  - 2 Violin Concertos, Op. 2
- Joseph Schmitt – 6 Symphonies, Op. 6
- Carl Stamitz
  - 6 Quartets, Op. 8
  - 6 Duos, Op. 10
- Johann Baptist Wanhal - Double Bass Concerto

== Methods and theory writings ==
- Charles Burney – The Present State of Music in Germany, the Netherlands, and United Provinces
- Michel Corrette – Méthodes pour apprendre à jouer de la contre-basse à 3, à 4, et à 5 cordes
- Johann Friedrich Daube – Der musikalische Dilettant
- Johann Adolph Scheibe – Über die musikalische Composition
- Georg Michael Telemann – Unterricht im Generalbaß-Spielen

== Births ==
- January 4 – Johann Peter Heuschkel, composer (died 1853)
- March 7 – Tommaso Marchesi, composer (died 1852)
- May 6 – Eliodoro Bianchi. Italian tenor (died 1848)
- May 26 – Hans Georg Nägeli, composer (died 1836)
- July 6 – Wenzel Thomas Matiegka, composer (died 1830)
- September 17 – Alexandre de Laborde, librettist and antiquary (died 1842)
- September 24 – Johann Philipp Christian Schulz, composer (died 1827)
- October 23 – Pietro Generali, composer (died 1832)
- December 9 – Marianne Ehrenström, musician and writer (died 1867)
- December 24 – Joseph Wölfl, pianist and composer (died 1812)
- exact date unknown
  - Edward Bunting, Irish folk song collector
  - Inga Åberg, opera singer and actress

== Deaths ==
- April 11 – Carlo Grua, composer (b. c. 1700)
- April 12 – Elizabeth Young, operatic contralto and actress (b. c. 1730)
- May 24 – Jan Zach, violinist, organist and composer (b. 1699)
- July 12 – Johann Joachim Quantz, flautist and composer (b. 1697)
- August 25 – Franz Nikolaus Novotny, organist and composer (born 1743)
- date unknown
  - Francis Hutcheson (b. c. 1722)
  - Joan Baptista Pla, oboist and composer (b. c. 1720)
  - Hester Santlow, "England's first ballerina" (b. c. 1690)
