= Petter Stenborg =

Swedish stage actor and theater director

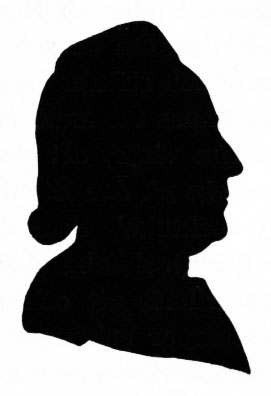
- Born: Petter Stenborg; 1719; Sweden
- Died: 1781 (aged c. 62); Sweden
- Spouse: Anna Sara Krüger

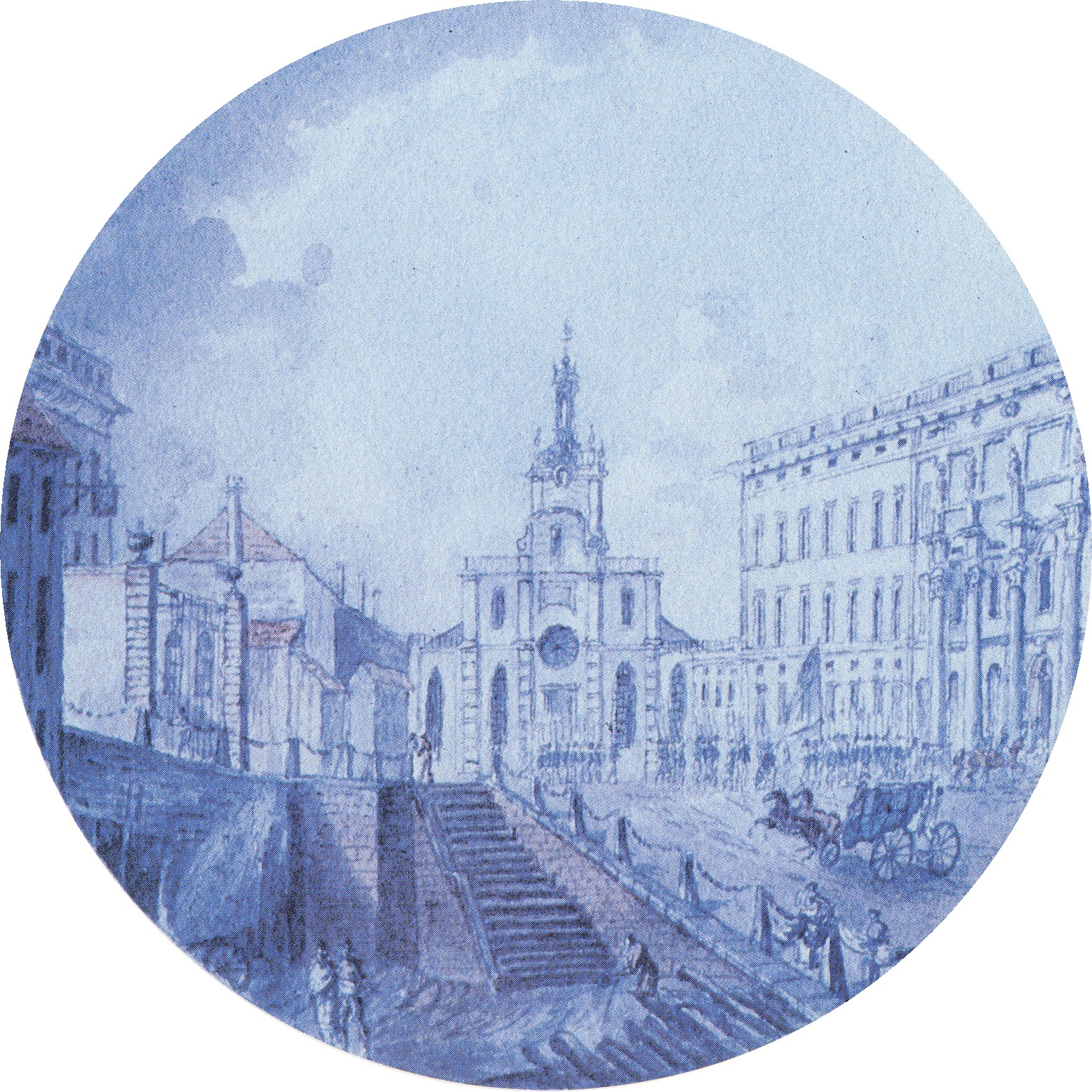
Bollhuset at Slottsbacken in Stockholm during the 1780s. From right to left: Stockholm Palace, Storkyrkan, Bollhuset Theatre and the Tessin Palace. Drawing, Martin Rudolf Heland.

Petter Stenborg (1719 – 6 November 1781) was a Swedish stage actor and theater director. He was the director of the Stenborg Company or Svenska Comoedi-truppen from 1758 onward and as such the director of the Humlegårdsteatern (1773–80) in Stockholm. Petter Stenborg played an important role in Swedish theater history: he was a member of the pioneer actors of the first Swedish national stage in Bollhuset, and as the leader of the Stenborg theatre company, one of only two professional Swedish language theater companies active in the mid 18th-century, he kept professional Swedish language theater alive from the closure of the public theater in Bollhuset in 1754, until the inauguration of the Royal Swedish Opera (1773) and Royal Dramatic Theatre (1788).

== Life ==
=== Early career ===
Petter Stenborg was initially a soldier of the Royal Guard. In 1746, he was engaged as an actor in the theater of Bollhuset in Stockholm. Two years after his employment, the director Charles Langlois referred to him as one of the most valuable members of the theater.

Among his roles were Philemon in Syrinx by Lars Lalin or Peter Lindahl with music by Johan Ohl, opposite Elisabeth Lillström (title role) Peter Lindahl (Harlequin), Johanna Embeck (Chlorix), Trundman (Sylvanus) and Elisabeth Olin (Astrild) in the 1747–48 season, which is known as the first Swedish opéra comique, and he is also believed to have had the leading role in Slafve-ön ('Slave island') by Marivaux (1749–50).

=== Director ===
After the season of 1753–54, the Swedish theater lost its permission to use the royal Bollhuset theater building, which was transferred to the use of the French Du Londel theater by king Adolph Frederick of Sweden and queen Louisa Ulrika. The Swedish language theater split in two travelling Swedish theater companies: the company of Peter Lindahl and Johan Bergholtz, and the Stenborg Company of Petter Stenborg, which became the first two Swedish language theater companies in Sweden.

Petter Stenborg initially made an attempt to start an inn, but successfully applied for a theater permit in 1758, and formed the Stenborg Company. The theater company performed in a number of temporary localities in Stockholm during the winter, and toured the country in summer. They also frequently performed in Finland, then a Swedish province, during his leadership in companionship with the tight-rope-walker von Carl Fredrik von Eckenberg: when they visited Åbo in 1761, it was likely the first time a professional theater company performed in Finland. He was the rival of the theater company of Peter Lindahl, who preferred to tour the Swedish country side, while Petter Stenborg mostly toured in Finland and in Stockholm.

The Stenborg Company was ridiculed by the upper classes, who preferred the French language Du Londel theater and described Stenborg theater company as composed by a staff of actors from "jail, soldiers, alcoholic lawyers, servants and washing-women", its costumes from rag shops, the music from taverns and the plays as vulgar as the taverns in which they performed. However, these judgement was likely unfair, made by aristocrats who preferred the fashionable French language plays, and the Stenborg Company was popular and appreciated by the public, though their trouble in finding suitable localities where a problem also for their quality. They were, alongside the theater companies of Peter Lindahl and Carl Seuerling, the only representatives of Swedish language professional theater during the reign of Frederick Adolph.

Among its most noted actors were Adolph Fredrik Neuman, Jean Löfblad, Johanna Embeck and Christina Catharina Lindberg.

=== Later career ===
In 1771, the French Du Londel theater was dissolved by after the succession to the throne by king Gustav III of Sweden. Petter Stenborg sent a petition to the monarch and asked him to protect the native speaking theater. He also successfully petitioned for the use of the now empty Bollhuset theater building, and were allowed to perform a public play at the opening of the Riksdag of the Estates in 1772. During the performance, the son of Petter Stenborg, Carl Stenborg, repeated the appeal to the king to protect the native theater. After this, King Gustav III announced his wish to establish a professional national stage, though he rejected the Stenborg Company to form it: he was to create the Royal Swedish Opera the following year, and later the Royal Dramatic Theatre.

The Stenborg Company, though rejected in its hope to staff the national royal stage, was still given protection from the king as a private company. In 1773, the theater company finally managed to secure a permanent theater building in Stockholm, the Humlegårdsteatern in Humlegården, where they performed every summer for the next seven years. The Stenborg Company became very successful in Humlegården as a part of the city's summer life, and staged Swedish language comedies, and popular parodies of the performances at the Royal Swedish Opera: the opera Thetis och Phelée, for example, became Petis och Nasenblomand Acis och Galathea became Kasper och Dorotea. It was, however, impossible to perform in the building during winter time.

Petter Stenborg had several children with Anna Sara Krüger, most notably Carl Stenborg. His wife had previously been the housekeeper of count Adam Horn and through her connections, their children were given a much better education than himself. Carl Stenborg became a star singer of the Royal Opera, and though forbidden by his contract to perform in his father's theater, he acted as his adviser. In 1780, Petter Stenborg retired and transferred the leadership of the Stenborg Company to his son, who immediately secured a permanent theater building where the company could perform also during the winters: the Eriksbergsteatern (it moved to the Stenborg Theatrefor years later).

Petter Stenborg died in 1781.

== See also ==
- Martin Nürenbach
- Karl Gustav Bonuvier
