= Franziska Stading =

Swedish opera singer

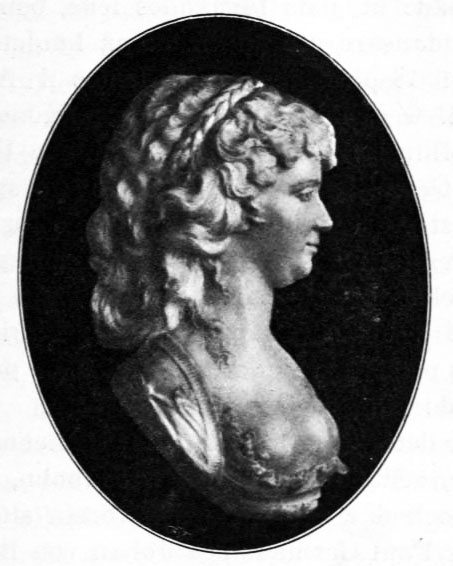
- Franziska Stading
- Born: Franziska Stading; 1763; Germany
- Died: 8 February 1836; Dresden, Germany

Sofia Franziska Stading (1763 – 8 February 1836) was a Swedish opera singer of German origin. She is referred to as one of the more notable opera singers in Sweden during the Gustavian era. She was a Hovsångare and member of the Royal Swedish Academy of Music from 1788.

== Life ==
Franziska Stading was born in Berlin in Prussia in Germany as the stepchild of the musician Josef Hummel, father of Johann Nepomuk Hummel. She appears to have been raised in The Hague in the Netherlands, and was reportedly at some point a student of Gertrud Elisabeth Mara in singing, and the pedagogue Graaf in music.

She reportedly arrived in Stockholm in Sweden as the relative of the German violinist Friedrich Benedict Augusti, the spouse of the opera singer Lovisa Augusti of the Royal Swedish Opera, where she was accepted as a student in 1773. Franziska Stading was unmarried but may have had a daughter, as Evelina Stading is referred to both as her daughter or her niece in various sources.

=== Career ===
Franziska Stading performed in a concert arranged by the Royal Swedish Academy of Music in 1778. The following year, she made her official stage début as an opera singer at Drottningholm Palace Theatre in the part of queen Myris in the opéra-comique Arsene by Monsigny in 1779, when she was given a contract as premier actress. Her debut has been described: "In a small insignificant role in Arséne a young German, Franciska Stading, was heard for the first time, and came to conquer an important place in the history of the Swedish theater with the sweet and modest pleasantness, the simplicity and lack of vanity, which characterized her song and acting", and Marianne Ehrenström commented about her that "Her dark eyes could touch even a stone."

Stading made a great success in the title role of the opera Cora och Alonzo by Naumann at the inauguration of the new building of the Royal Swedish Opera on 30 September 1782, after which she came to be one of the most celebrated stars in the opera of the Gustavian era, admired both as an opera singer and for her dramatic ability as an actress. Of all the idol images printed of the singers of the opera, she was the only one of her generation (male or female) to have three different versions of her portrait printed simultaneously. When Lovisa Augusti died in 1790, Stading and Caroline Frederikke Müller reportedly shared the position of the leading prima donna of the Royal Swedish Opera, and divided the female main parts of the biggest opera's between themselves.

She performed leading roles in many of the new Swedish opera plays of the era, such as Margareta Wasa in Gustaf Wasa by Naumann with text by Johan Henric Kellgren (1786), the title role of Frigga by Åhlström (1787), and the female lead of Ebba Brahe in Gustaf Adolph och Ebba Brahe by Vogler and Kellgren (1788). She was also appreciated in several French opéra-comiques by Dalayrac and Grétry, such as Andromaque (1785). When she acted in Iphigenia i Aulis by Glück in the season of 1802-03, she was one of the first do adopt the new way of dressing in costumes adjusted to the time period of the role, which was an innovation at that time.

One of her greatest successes was reportedly the part of Antigone in Oedip i Athen by Sacchini (1800), in which she, according to Malla Silfverstolpe, displayed "the mild innocence and also the heroic dé-vouement which all the sweetest of female characters possess", which Skjöldebrand described from Paris in 1810: "I saw the opera Oedipe this evening... and found with a certain patriotic pleasure that it was better in Stockholm, contributing primarily to the great advantage of Karsten in song as well as action ... and also the truth, the touching impression, in which Antigone was previously performed by mamsell Stading."

In 1788, she was given recognition as a leading figure of Swedish musical life by her appointment of Hovsångare and her induction to chair nr. 107 of the Royal Swedish Academy of Music the 2 February of that year. Her induction to the Academy was a great honor awarded only to the absolute Musical elite: until that year, Elisabeth Olin had been the only woman member, but in 1788, Stading was inducted alongside Caroline Frederikke Müller and Lovisa Augusti.

Franziska Stading never married. As a private person, it is mentioned that she enjoyed to visit the concerts of Royal Swedish Academy of Music as a part of the audience.

On the funeral of Gustav III of Sweden on 14 May 1792, Franziska Stading, Caroline Frederikke Müller, Christopher Christian Karsten, Carl Stenborg and Elisabeth Olin performed as soloists in Riddarholmskyrkan in a song by Joseph Martin Kraus with text from Carl Gustaf af Leopold. She also performed with Christopher Christian Karsten, Elisabeth Olin and Carl Stenborg at the funeral of Joseph Martin Kraus in 1798.

In 1806, Franziska Stading retired from the stage with a full royal pension and left Sweden to settle in Dresden in Germany, where she died.

=== Roles ===
She played the main part in Cora och Alonzo by Naumann at the premier of the new building of the Opera in the 1782–83 season opposite Elisabeth Olin and Carl Stenborg, and Margareta Vasa in Gustav Vasa by Gustav III, the 19 January 1786, an opera called the greatest triumph of the Gustavian opera, regarded as her greatest part. Among her other parts where Myris in Arséne by Monsigny the 1779–80 year season, Sangaride in Atys by Piccini 1784–85 season, Andromache in Andromaque by Racine 1785–86, the goddess Frigga in Frigga by Gustav III, 1786–87, Elektra in Elektra by Johann Christian Friedrich Hæffner and Ebba Brahe in Gustav Adolf och Ebba Brahe (Gustav Adolf and Ebba Brahe) by Gustav III 1787–88, Ingrid in Folke Birgersson till Ringstad (Folke Birgersson of Ringstad) by Gustav III 1792–93, Charlotte in Renaud d'Ast by Dalayrac 1795–96, Antigone in Oidipus i Athen (Oidipus in Athens) by Sacchini 1800–01 opposite Christoffer Christian Karsten and Anais in Anakreon på Samos (Anachreon on Samos) by Gretry during the 1802–03 season.

== Legacy ==
Gustav Löwenhielm mentioned her importance in Swedish theater and opera history in the 19th century, during a discussion about the employment of foreign artists, when he pointed out that several of the artists during the foundation of the Royal Swedish Opera and the Royal Dramatic Theatre had been foreigners:

"Is it impossible to engage Mr Berg and Miss Schoultz? - Generally, I can not see how we can elude the employment of half grown foreigners. Gustav III's Swedish national theatre started with the Danish Mrs Müller, the French Mrs Marcadet, the German Mamsell Stading, the German Mrs Augusti and the Polish Mrs Karsten. These ladies occupied our stage and kept it from the foundation of the opera and the premature departure of Mrs Olin in the beginning of the 1780s, until the year of 1800, when the school of Mrs Desguillons had created Mamsell Wässelia cum celeris."
