= Lovisa Augusti =

Swedish opera singer (1751–1790)

Lovisa Sofia Augusti
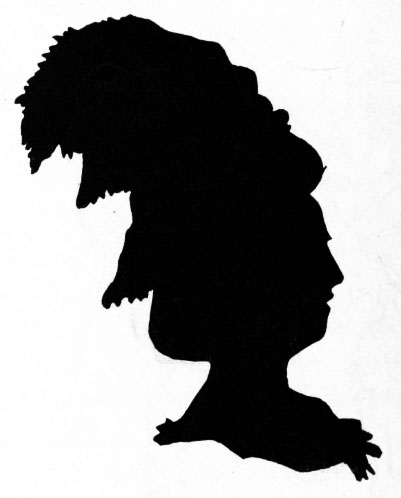
- Lovisa Augusti
- Born: Ester Salomon; 1751; Germany
- Died: 25 June 1790 (aged 38–39); Stockholm, Sweden
- Other name: Lovisa Sofia Salomoni
- Spouse: Friedrich Benedict Augusti

Lovisa Sofia Augusti (born Ester Salomon; 1751 – 25 June 1790) was a Swedish opera singer (soprano). She was regarded as one of the most noted opera singers of the Royal Swedish Opera during the Gustavian era. She was appointed Hovsångare in 1773 and inducted to the Royal Swedish Academy of Music in 1788.

== Life ==
=== Early life ===
Lovisa Augusti was born in 1751 Germany under the name Ester Salomon as the daughter of the travelling Jewish-German musician Israel Salomon. She was trained as a singer, while her brother Carl Friedrich Wilhelm Salomoni was trained as a violinist.

In 1766, she arrived in Sweden with her brother and father. They are noted to have performed in Varberg in that year, when her brother played the violin while she sang Italian arias. She performed in a concert with a musician of the royal Hovkapellet, Francesco Antonio Uttini on 22 February 1767 in Gothenburg, where she made a success. On 25 March 1767, she converted to Lutheranism in the Gothenburg Cathedral and was given the name Lovisa Sofia Salomoni; her brother also converted, though the date of his baptism is not mentioned. They reportedly converted to avoid the strict regulations regarding non-Christian entertainers.

After her conversion, she became the protege of the wife of General von Kaulbar. She married the German violinist Friedrich Benedict Augusti in 1772.

=== Career at the Royal opera ===
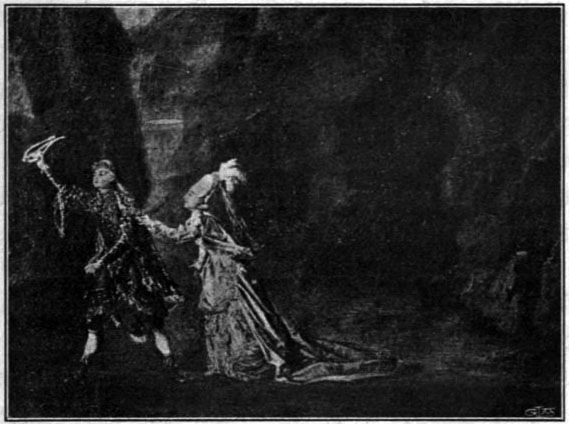
One of her successes, Orpheus and Eurydice, by Pehr Hilleström

In 1773, she performed for king Gustav III of Sweden during his visit to Kristianstad. The king was so impressed by her performance that he granted her a position at the Royal Swedish Opera and appointed her court singer, and her spouse and brother where both engaged at the Royal orchestra.

Her education is unknown, but her voice is described as well schooled to its sound and skill, and she was regarded as one of the best singers of the nation. To her appearance, she was described as pretty and diminutive and referred to as "Little Mrs Augusti". Augusti was the cover for the great prima donna Elisabeth Olin whenever she was sick or had to take maternity leave. Like Elisabeth Olin, she had very good employment terms: in 1776, she was given a contract for life, was granted privileges such as the right to use the carriages belonging to the stables of the royal court and to set her own terms, such as to demand that her productions should be held in the name of the Royal Swedish Academy of Music to protect her status.

On 12 February 1788, the same year as her colleagues Caroline Halle-Müller and Franziska Stading, she was inducted to the Royal Swedish Academy of Music on chair number 106.

Her spouse left the country because of his debts in 1787, and she had no children. She died 1790 in Stockholm.

=== Roles ===
Her most well-known roles were her portrayal of Apollo (and later the part of Eurydice) in Orpheus and Eurydice by Glück in 1775, the part of Love in Adonis (the season 1775–76), Astrild in Silvie by Berton (1773–74), the Joy in Amphion by Adlerbeth, Anna Eriksdotter (Bielke) in Gustaf Vasa by Gustav III (1785) and Märta Banér in Gustaf Adolf and Ebba Brahe by Gustav III (1787–1788). Other parts were Amphitrite in Neptun and Amphitrite by Gallodier with Johan Filip Lising (1774–1775), Aeglé in Aeglé by Adlerbeth with Carl Stenborg (1774–75), Zelis in Aline, drottning av Golconda by Uttini, (1775–76), Lucile in Lucile with Carl Stenborg (1775–76), Lovisa in Desertören (1776–77), and Jealousy in Procris and Cephal by Gretry (1777–78).

== Legacy ==
Gustav Löwenhielm mentioned her importance in Swedish theater and opera history in the 19th century, during a discussion about the employment of foreign artists, when he pointed out that several of the artists during the foundation of the Royal Swedish Opera and the Royal Dramatic Theatre had been foreigners:

"Is it impossible to engage Mr Berg and Miss Schoultz? - Generally, I can not see how we can elude the employment of half grown foreigners. Gustav III's Swedish national theatre started with the Danish Mrs Müller, the French Mrs Marcadet, the German Mamsell Stading, the German Mrs Augusti and the Polish Mrs Karsten. These ladies occupied our stage and kept it from the foundation of the opera and the premature departure of Mrs Olin in the beginning of the 1780s, until the year of 1800, when the school of Mrs Desguillons had created Mamsell Wässelia cum celeris."

== See also ==
- Mathilda Berwald
