= Uttini =

Uttini is an Italian surname. Notable people with the surname include:

- Francesco Uttini (1723–1795), Italian composer and conductor active mostly in Sweden
- Sofia Uttini, married name of Sofia Liljegren (1765–1795), Swedish-Finnish soprano, second wife of Francesco
