= Sofia Liljegren =

Swedish-Finnish soprano

Sofia Ulrika Liljegren, also known as Sofia Uttini (1765 – December 6, 1795), was a Swedish-Finnish soprano. She was likely the first professional opera singer from Finland, although she was active in Sweden. She was given the title hovsångerska.

Sofia Liljegren was born in Rantasalmi in Finland. In 1781, she was engaged at the choir of the Royal Swedish Opera in Stockholm.

In 1783, she was the replacement of Elisabeth Olin in the main part of Iphigénie en Aulide by Gluck, after which she was recommended to Gustav III of Sweden as a soloist. She seem to have enjoyed a period of great popularity during the 1780s. Her perhaps most known part was Clytaimnestra in Elektra by Hæffner. She is often mentioned among the most notable names in the Swedish opera during the late 18th century. Gustaf Löwenhielm, while referring to her as somewhat overestimated and not as good as Inga Åberg, does mention her as one of the few native talents in the period between the retirement of Elisabeth Olin in 1784 and the 1800 breakthrough of Jeanette Wässelius. A sign of her notability was her appointment as hovsångerska. In the 1790s, her popularity declined somewhat.

In 1791, she and her husband made plans to take over the Comediehuset in Gothenburg and settle there with her in the position of prima donna, but the plans were not realized.

She married the composer Francesco Uttini in 1788.
