= Rosa Scarlatti =

Italian opera singer (1727–1775)

Rosa Scarlatti (1727 – 15 December 1775) was an Italian opera singer.

She was the niece of Alessandro or Domenico Scarlatti and the sister of composer Giuseppe Scarlatti (1723–1777). She married composer Francesco Uttini in 1753, and became the mother of the ballet dancer Carlo Uttini.

Rosa Scarlatti was active as an opera singer in Florence in 1747. In 1752–53 and again in 1755–57, she was engaged in the Italian Opera company at the Swedish royal court. She also performed at public concerts at the Swedish House of Lords. After the Italian Opera company was dissolved, she served as a concert singer at the royal court: she was still paid a salary in the capacity of a court singer in 1772, though by this time she was no longer deemed suitable to serve.
