= Jean Löfblad =

Swedish stage actor

Jean (Johan) Löfblad (1728-1774), was a Swedish stage actor. He was a member of the Stenborg Company, for a long period the only Swedish language theater active in Stockholm, and described as the leading star and attraction of the company together with his wife, Johanna Löfblad. He was foremost famed for his role as Harlequin, a very popular genre, and referred to as the "Harlequin of Stockholm".
