= Carlo Uttini =

Swedish opera singer

Carlo Uttini (1753-1808), was a Swedish ballet dancer. He was regarded as one of the elite members of the Royal Swedish Ballet in 1773–1804, and was also active as singer of the Royal Swedish Opera (1776–79) and as an actor at the French Theater of Gustav III (1781–92) and at the Royal Dramatic Theatre (1788-1808). He was also inspector of the royal theaters for many years. He was the son of Francesco Antonio Uttini and Rosa Scarlatti.
