= Christian Berner =

Swedish stage actor and pioneer ballet master

Christian Berner (1702–1773), was a Swedish stage actor, ballet dancer and ballet master. He was a member of the pioneer generation of stage performers at the first national stage Kungliga svenska skådeplatsen in Bollhuset. He was a pioneer performer and the first native ballet master and likely the first professional native ballet dancer in Sweden known by name.

Berner is listed as the ballet master of the ballet at the theatre from 1738 to 1754. As such, he was the first native ballet master in Sweden. He is not explicitly listed as a dancer, but is likely to have participated in performances as a dancer as well. As such, was also one of the first native dancers in Sweden; while the Royal Swedish Ballet was not established until 1773, the Bollhuset theatre had a ballet composed of native dancers in 1738–54, though the names of the dancers does not appear to be known. It is known that the benefit of the performances was given to Berner several times, as was often done for the more valuable members of the theatre.
