= Sturegatan =

Street in Östermalm, Stockholm, Sweden

Coordinates: 59°20′24″N 18°04′34″E

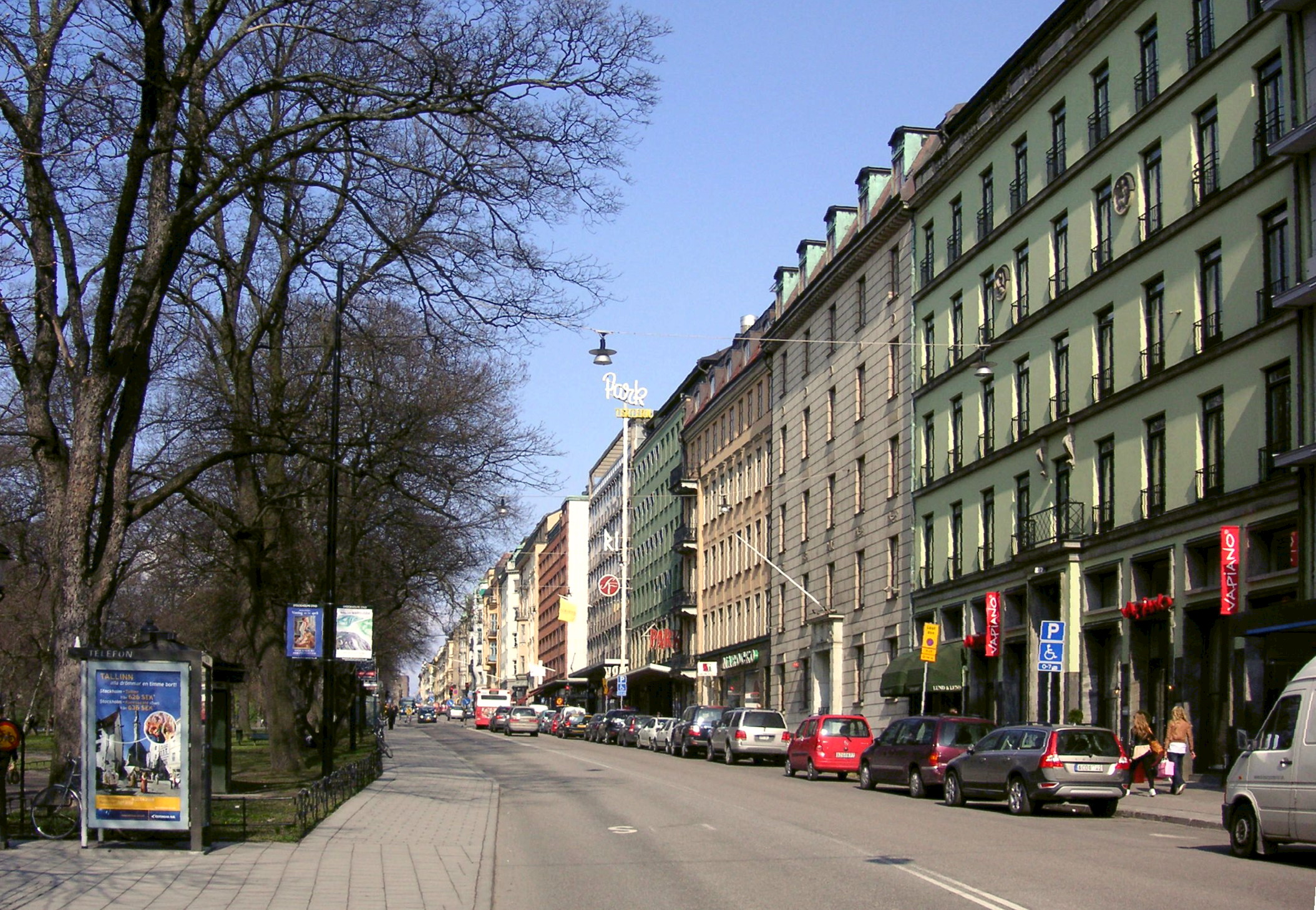
Sturegatan as seen from the south. Humlegården is located on the left-hand side.

Sturegatan is a street in the borough of Östermalm in Stockholm.
