= Elisabeth Olin =

Swedish opera singer (1740–1828)

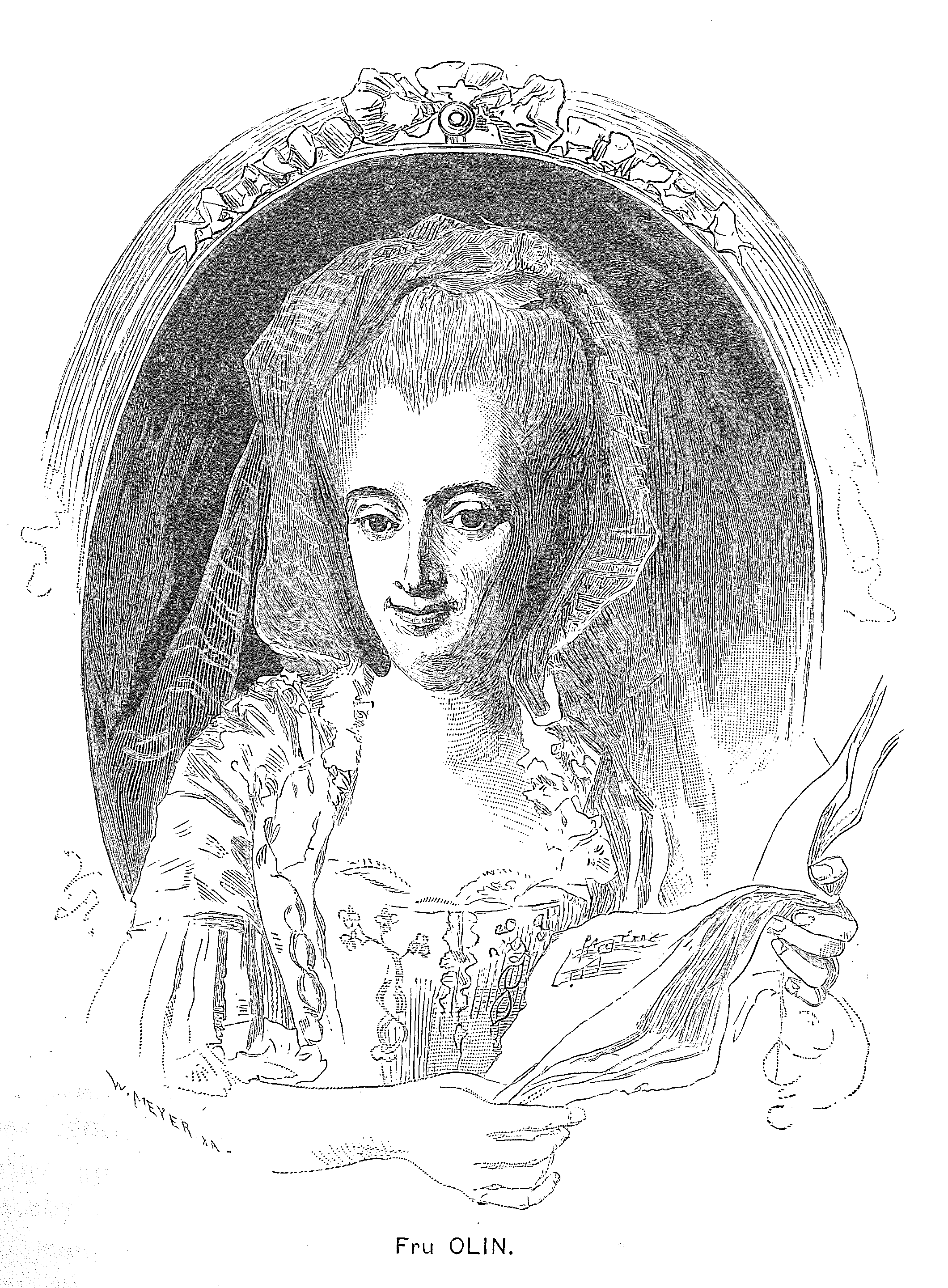
- Elisabeth Olin, 1780s
- Born: Elisabeth Lillström; December 1740
- Died: 26 March 1828 (aged 87)
- Occupations: Opera singer, composer
- Known for: Referred to as the first primadonna in her country
- Spouse: Gabriel Olin
- Children: Betty Olin

Notes
- Hovsångare, the first female member of the Royal Swedish Academy of Music (1782)

Elisabeth Olin née Lillström (December 1740 – 26 March 1828) was a Swedish opera singer and a music composer. She performed the leading female role in the inauguration performance of the Royal Swedish Opera in 1773, and is referred to as the first Swedish opera prima donna. She was the first female to be made hovsångerska (1773), and the first woman to become a member of the Royal Swedish Academy of Music (1782).

== Life ==
Elisabeth Olin was the daughter of the musician Petter Lillström and the actress and singer Elisabeth Lillström. Her parents were both engaged at the opera theater of Bollhuset, Sweden's first professional national stage, where her father was an organist in the theater orchestra, and her mother was one of the first professional actresses in Sweden, the prima donna of the theater and a member of the theater's board of directors.

=== Early career ===
Elisabeth Olin, then called Betty Lillström, debuted at the age of seven at Bollhuset in 1747 the part of Alfhild in Syrinx, called Sweden's first native Opera comique. She was a popular child actor and described as a valuable member of the theater. After the season of 1754–54, the Swedish language opera theater was dissolved when the royal Bollhuset localities were given to the French theater which was favored by the queen. The Swedish theater split into two travelling theaters, and Elisabeth Olin and her parents joined the Stenborg Troupe.

She was given singing lessons by Petter Stenborg, the leading actor of the Stenborg Troupe, and lessons in clavecin and music theory by Ferdinand Zellbell the Younger, conductor of the Royal orchestra. Elisabeth Olin is believed to have been active as a professional concert singer since at least the late 1750s. She was a popular singer at the concerts regularly performed at the Riddarhuset during the 1760s, where her earliest performance is noted to have taken place in a concert by her mentor Zellbell in 1761. A noted performance was on a concert directed by Francesco Uttini in 1769, when she was described as a very popular concert singer, who was appreciated by the nobility, often performing on private concerts.

On 19 November 1769, Johan Gabriel Oxenstierna commented:

"I visited the Cavalier's concert today, so called as it was performed exclusively by music lovers and not by someone from the Royal Orchestra. Mrs Olin sang. :I dare say no one in Italy has a sweeter voice. Uncertain whether one should love her for her beauty or her divine voice, she gains love and admiration in parallel."

Elisabeth Olin was also active as a composer. In 1768, she was one of the Swedish composers who contributed with her own composition to the collection Gustaviade. En hjältedikt i tolv sånger ('Gustaviade. A heroic poem of twelve songs'), where she contributed with her own song for composition number eight. Another of her surviving compositions is En liten Sårland bäck (tr. "A small Saarland stream").

Elisabeth Olin married the official Gabriel Olin (1728–1794) in 1760, with whom she had six children. Her husband is described as proud of her and supportive of her career.

=== Career at the Royal Opera ===
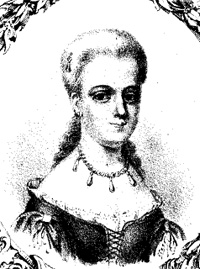
Elisabeth Olin

After the dissolution of the French language theater of Stockholm in 1771, the new monarch, Gustav III of Sweden, decided to establish a Swedish language theater and opera. The Stenborg Troupe, which was by then the remains of the former Swedish language opera theater that had been dissolved in 1754 and had been a travelling theater ever since, was called to perform before the monarch at Bollhuset in 1772, but when they did not prove to be up to his standards, he decided to compose an entirely new royal Swedish language opera.

As the stage profession had a low social status at the time, the king had difficulties in assembling educated native talents willing to form the pioneer staff of the opera. Elisabeth Olin, as a highly regarded and well educated professional singer, was early on considered. However, she was by then married to an official and performing professionally on stage was not considered proper for a woman of her new social class. Consequently, the king had "hardly dared to hope" of her participation, when she herself offered to participate on her own initiative without having been asked. This gave her a great advantage in the negotiations. In an attempt to solve the issue of status, King Gustav III named his opera the 'Royal Swedish Opera', made its staff formally a part of the Royal Household and jurisdiction of the king, gave the women employees (who as stage artists had lower status than men) higher salaries than their male colleagues, and named Elisabeth Olin Singer of the Royal Court of the First Rank. She was granted the highest salary of any member of the Opera regardless of sex or position, and the king remarked, after the negotiations where finished: "She holds herself very expensive." Her sister and her daughter were also given positions at the opera.

Elisabeth Olin performed the role of the Sea Goddess Thetis in Francesco Uttini's opera Thetis och Pélée in the inauguration of the Royal Swedish Opera on 18 January 1773, opposite Carl Stenborg as Pélée and her daughter Betty Olin as Amor.

The performance was a legendary success. The French ambassador Charles Gravier, comte de Vergennes expressed his surprise to see opera performed so fully upon its very foundation, and the Italian abbé Domenico Michelessi commented about the performance: "It is surprising to see eight actors, and nine of their retinue, who has never before seen opera, played with such insight of it, among them a youth [Carl Stenborg] and a lady [Elisabeth Olin], both of whom are worthy one of the best stage in Italy." King Gustav III himself commented:

"Mrs Olin, who plays Thetis, which is the main part, has much nobility in her acting, a pleasing figure and more stage habit than one would expect from one who :shows herself there the first time. You no her voice, and in which high degree she is capable in the area of music. She acts with much art and grace in the :first act as well as in the third and fifth, particularly in every piece in which some fierté or contempt is to be displayed. One may confidently expect her to :become a great actress with more training. Chancellor Stenborg, who plays Pelée, joins a quite pleasing figure with much musical knowledge, a sufficient amount :of grace in his acting and a fine feeling of his character."

The paper Nya allmänna tidningar commented:

"Mrs Olin and Mrs Carl Stenborg played the main roles and should play them. Their acting and voices delighted everyone to hear them play, the former Thetis and :the later Pelée. The others took care to fulfill their roles, and the gentlemen Lalin, Nordén, Björkman and Lising have been given much praise. :But how should one express the grace which was displayed in the acting of young mamsell Olin, who played the god of love? She did so undoubtedly :well. Choir and ballets varied and illuminated the performances in a way never before seen in Sweden. Mr Gallodier and Mrs Soligny displayed their excellent art, and among Swedish talents is noted a young mamsell Slottsberg, who will with no doubt become a great ornament to our stage."

Elisabeth Olin managed to raise her salary two years later by threatening to resign, and after five years she demanded (and subsequently received) full salary as pension whenever she chose to retire. She is likely to have received the highest salary any woman ever had been paid in 18th-century Sweden regardless of profession. She made an occasional guest appearance in the Stenborg theatre, the theatre of Carl Stenborg and his father Petter Stenborg, her former mentor.

Olin, reportedly, did not like rivals and disliked to be substituted by her rival Lovisa Augusti, who played her parts when she was indisposed by illness or childbirth (she had six children). From the early 1780s, she was met with serious competition from Caroline Frederikke Müller, who was so favored by the king that he asked her to return to her employment after having fled abroad to escape her creditors, and gave her immunity from repaying her debts: when Olin announced her retirement in 1782, it was said that she had done so because she refused to compete with Müller. Her last performance was as Clytemnestra in Iphigenia in Aulis in the 1783–84 season.

In parallel, her relationship with Carl Stenborg was discontinued in 1782, when he became engaged to her daughter, the opera singer Betty Olin (1761–1816), also called Elisabeth Olin the Younger. This was reportedly traumatic: Elisabeth Olin did not approve of the engagement of her former lover and her daughter, and Betty Olin and Carl Stenborg did in fact not marry until 1793, after an eleven-year-long engagement.

In 1782 she was inducted into the Royal Swedish Academy of Music, and in 1788 she became a member of the academy committee.

=== Estimation and roles ===
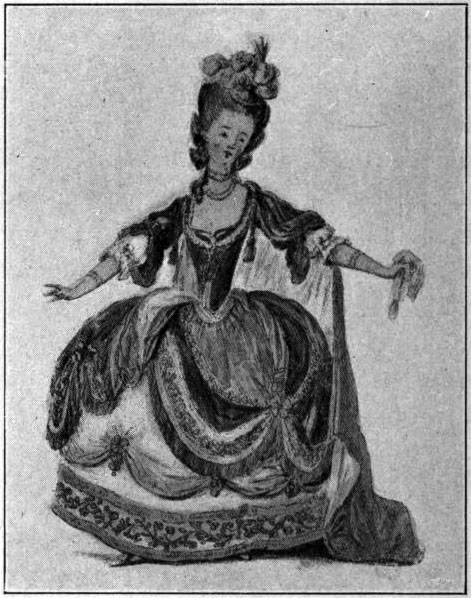
Elisabeth Olin as Klytemnestra.

Elisabeth Olin was described as a beauty with a fine figure and suggestive eyes, with a musical and dramatic talent which was described as passionate and noble. Elisabeth Olin was compared to Francesca Cuzzoni, Faustina Bordoni and Caterina Gabrielli. She has been referred to as "Sweden's first dramatic artist", "The Swedish Mara" (after Gertrud Elisabeth Mara). As a member of the pioneer generation of the Royal Swedish Opera, she has been called one of the "matriarchs of the Opera."

Elisabeth Olin was for many years in a long-term relationship with her colleague the opera singer Carl Stenborg, who was the son of her former mentor Petter Stenborg. As the leading female and male opera star of the Royal Swedish Opera, the frequently played the main male and female roles and acted as lovers onstage, and the fact that they were also lovers in private attracted great attention and engaged the critics. In the inauguration performance of the Royal Swedish Opera, Thetis och Pélée, Elisabeth Olin was praised for her beauty, her grace and her engaging voice, and Carl Stenborg as a beautiful blonde youth with a not strong but skillfully handled voice with the ability to give the Swedish "a new pleasure", and that they were able to portray lovers convincingly. It was noted that "everyone knew of the tender relationship he [Stenborg] had with Mrs Olin", and this was reputed to be the reason as to why Olin had finally accepted to participate in the opera. The opera was a success and ran for a full house twice a week during a period of fourteen weeks. On one occasion, when Olin fell sick, Carl Stenborg was reportedly unwilling to play lover to her replacement Charlotte Eckerman until he was forced to by royal command.

On a couple of occasions prior to the founding of the Royal Dramatic Theatre, the artists of the opera was asked to participate in speaking theater drama plays. As theater had lower social status than opera, Elisabeth Olin initially refused to participate when she was asked to take a speaking role in Athalie by Jean Racine (1776), as speaking drama had not been included in her contract. At this occasion, her relationship to Carl Stenborg was used to persuade her. Her contract as the most privileged member of the opera, and her social status as being a member of the upper class and only participating after having all her terms met in the contract, meant that she could not be forced, but as director Zibet informed the king: "She is with no doubt too tender to wish to humiliate her lover by refusing to take part in a performance, in which he could not refuse to participate."

Among her best known performances were Galatea in Acis och Galathea by Händel with Carl Stenborg (1773), Eurydice in Orfeus and Eurydice by Glück with Stenborg, Iphigenia in Iphigenia on Tauris by Gluck and the title characters in Athalie by Jean Racine, Silvie by Berton and Trial with Stenborg (season 1773–74), Aline, drottning av Golconda by Uttini with Stenborg (1775–76), and Procris och Cephal by Gretry with Stenborg (1777–78), Clytemnestra in Iphigenie in Aulis by Glück with Stenborg (1778–79) and Zulma in Cora och Alonzo by Naumann (1782–83).

She also performed privately for the royal court. She played the role of Mechtild in Birger jarl opposite Stenborg in Rikssalen in the Royal Palace, Stockholm during the wedding between Duke Charles and Hedwig Elizabeth Charlotte of Holstein-Gottorp in 1774.

=== Later life ===
Elisabeth Olin remained formally listed in the opera register until 1803. After 1788, however, she only made very few guest performances. Her most noted was at the wedding between King Gustav IV Adolf of Sweden and Frederica of Baden, when she performed the role of Svea on the king's request.

She made her last performance at a concert in Riddarhuset in 1809, when she participated in the farewell concert for Carl Stenborg, which was also his last performance before his retirement. Her voice was described as unchanged.

During Angelica Catalani's visit in Sweden in 1828, Elisabeth Olin performed privately for her to demonstrate her voice, just a couple of weeks before her death.
