= Stenborg Company =

Swedish theatre company

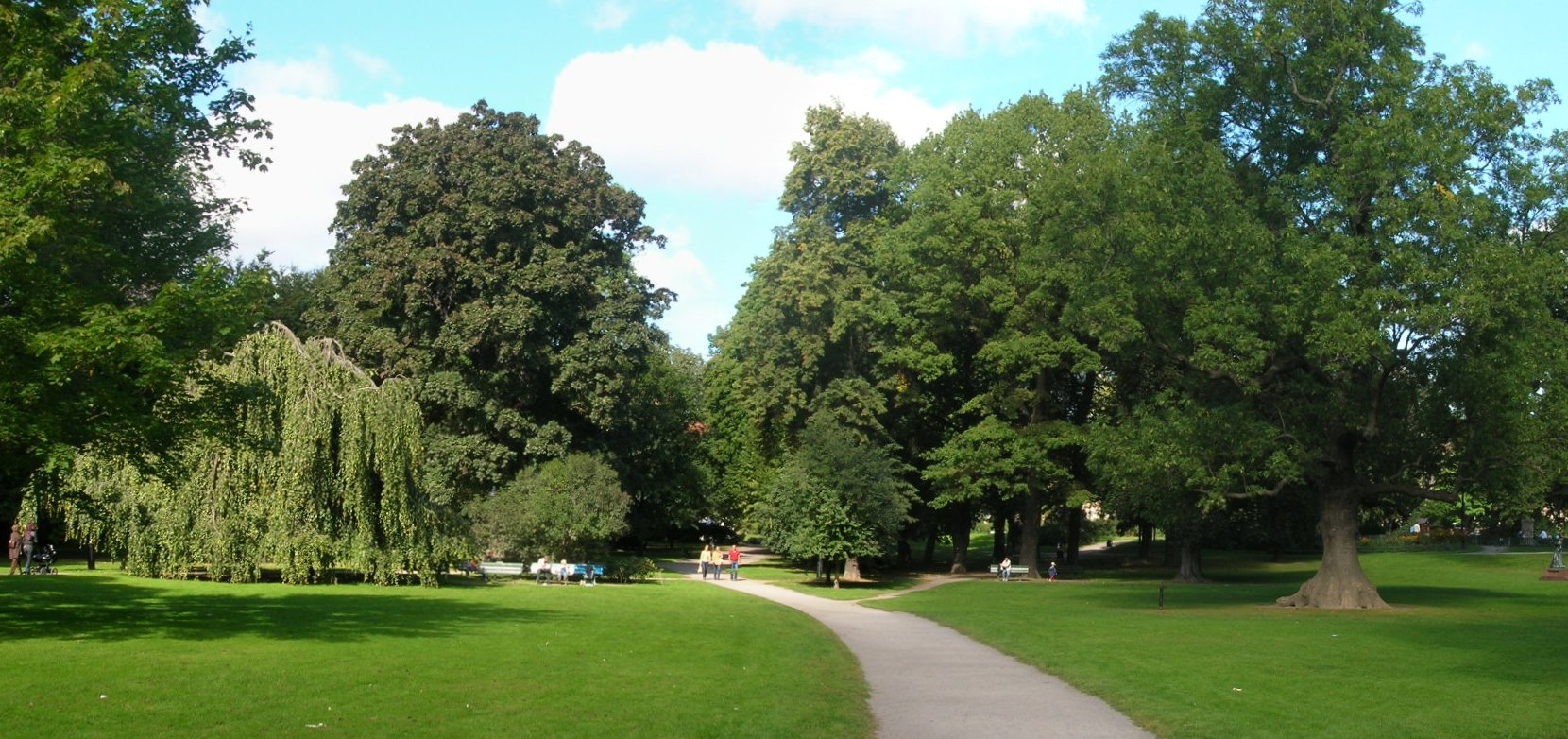
The northern part of Humlegården with oak trees and lawns; the Stenborg troupe often performed here in the summers.

The Stenborg Company (Swedish: Stenborgsföretag) was a Swedish theatre company, active in Sweden and Finland in the 18th century. It was also called Stenborgska skådebanorna ('Stenborg Stages'), Svenska komeditruppen ('Swedish Comedy Troupe') and Svenska Comedien ('Swedish Comedy') or Svenska Teatern ('Swedish Theatre'). It is one of the most famous theatre troupes in its country's history. In the period of 1754–1773, between the closure of the first national Swedish theatre in Bollhuset and the foundation of the next, The Royal Swedish Opera and the Royal Dramatic Theatre, it was the only Theatre performing in the native language in Stockholm. It also has an importance for the history of Finland, being the first professional secular theatre troupe in this country. It was a traveling troupe in 1756–80 and then housed in several buildings.

== History ==
When the Swedish troupe, active on the theater since 1737, was fired in 1753 and replaced with the French Du Londel Troupe, half of the staff left for the countryside to work as a traveling theater company under Peter Lindahl and Johan Bergholtz, while the rest remained in Stockholm in an attempt to start a new theatre. In 1756, The actor Petter Stenborg applied and was given permission to lead a theater company in the city of Stockholm, and between 1758 and for twenty years forward, he performed as the director of a troupe of native actors in both Stockholm, in temporary locales, and touring the country, mostly in Finland, first in companionship with the tight-rope-walker von Carl Fredrik von Eckenberg; when the troupe visited Turku in 1761, it was probably the first time a theatre troupe visited Finland.

== The first period ==
The Stenborg troupe is most known for its activity in Stockholm, where it preserved a Swedish-speaking theater during a period when the French culture otherwise dominated the Swedish stage. The theatre did not have a good reputation among the upper-classes; the actors were from "the jail, soldiers, alcoholized lawyers, servants, and washing-women", the costumes were from rag shops and the music from public-houses, (where they often performed), and the plays was described as vulgar; these judgements were given by members of the upper classes, who preferred French theater, but the Stenborg Company was much appreciated by the public, who could not understand the French language at Bollhuset. They represented a native speaking theater in the 1750s and 1760s. During the period of 1754–71, Swedish plays were only performed in the city stage of Bollhuset two times; Syrinx (1761) and Herkules på skiljovägen (1762) to the benefit of musician Petter Lillström, husband of Elisabeth Lillström actress in the Stenborg Troupe. At the performance of Jeppe på Berget by Holberg in 1763, the theatre on Kindstugatan, it was noted that the locale had places for three hundred spectators.

Among the actors were former tailor Jean Löfblad, the Harlequin of the troupe; the Harlekin of the company, Fredric Neuman; Johanna Löfblad, earlier active both at Bollhuset and the Lindahl troupe and active at the Stenborg troupe until the 1790s and thereby one of the longest active actors in Sweden in the 18th century; and the prima donna Christina Catharina Lindberg, also earlier active in Bollhuset.

The performances were often Harlequin-comedies, in which the star was Jean Löfblad, but also the old Swedish plays from Bollhuset and foreign plays, often from France. The most popular play was The defended Venus, which was first performed in Bollhuset, and it was said, that whenever the theatre needed money and had to be sure to have a large audience, the gave this play. In 1770, the Houseghost and then The enchanted bridegroom by Holberg was performed, which was aroused attention as the first play was performed only by men, the latter only by women.

In 1771, king Gustav III of Sweden fired the French theater company, and the Swedish actors, led by Petter Stenborg, saw their chance and asked to perform a play at the opening of the parliament of 1772. In the play, Stenborg asked the monarch to protect the native speaking theatre. At the opening of parliament in 1772, the troupe of Petter Stenborg appeared before King Gustav III and all the public in Bollhuset after the French troupe had left it, in which play the son of Stenborg, Carl, again asked for protection for the native theatre. The play was considered very bad by the nobility, but the public applauded it immensely, which was seen as a public appeal to open a theatre in the native language again. After this, the monarch decided to found a native speaking opera and theatre, though not with the Stenborg troupe.

== The second period ==
In 1773, the troupe, whose biggest problem was the difficulty of getting venues, and had to move from one place to the next over the years. Finally, they found a good place to perform; the so-called Humlegårdsteatern, "The Humlegården Theatre", where they performed every summer until 1780. This was described as a sort of pavilion, Rotundan, in the public park Humlegården. Here, they played simple comedies in the native language, sometimes caricatures of the solemn performances in Bollhuset.

Humlegårdsteatern became a very popular part of the city's summer life; the opera-performances Thetis och Phelée became Petis och Nasenblom, Acis och Galathea became Kasper och Dorotea.

== The last period ==
In 1780, Petter Stenborg retired, and his company was taken over by his son Carl Stenborg; he was a singer at the Opera and could not tour outside the city, and therefore searched for a real house for the troupe, where they could perform all year. He found one at Eriksberg, thereby called the Eriksbergsteatern (Eriksberg Theater), but it was uncomfortably outside town.

In 1784, he found the final location for the company at Munkbron, called the Munkbro Theater but commonly referred to as Stenborg Theater, who were the second most important theater in Stockholm until the monopoly of the Royal Dramatic Theatre closed it down in 1799. In 1804–09, Carl Stenborg toured in the countryside with his own troupe, which could be considered as the very least period of the Stenborg troupe.

== Localities for the Stenborg Theater in Stockholm ==
Until 1780, the troupe toured the country in both Sweden and Finland when it was not performing in Stockholm. When it performed in Stockholm, it used various localities until 1773.

- 1760 The Theater in the Bergstrahl house.
- 1762 The Theater in the loft on Kindstugatan.
- 1768 The Theater at the camp of the royal guard.
- 1769 The Theater in Dowager Lafont's Coffee-house at Järntorget.
- 1773 The Pavilion Rotundan in the park of Humlegården, "Humlegårdsteatern".
- 1780 The Eriksberg Theater, ("Eriksbergsteatern").
- 1784 The Munkbro theater.

== Actors in the troupe of 1765 ==
When the troupe left Stockholm to tour in the Swedish countryside in May 1765, it was made of the following members:

- Petter Stenborg (with his sons Nils Gustaf Stenborg and Carl Stenborg)
- Jean Löfblad
- Johan Ahlbeck
- Carl Adam Höckerstedt
- Christian Vougt
- Johanna Catharina Enbeck
- Christina Catharina Lindberg
- Madame Schederman
- Brita Christina Neberg
- Lars Lindberg
- Madame Ulrika Mar. Christlieb

== Actors in the troupe of 1773 ==
After the inauguration of the theatre at Humlegården during 1773, the troupe toured in Finland the winter of 1773–74, consisting of the following:

- Jean Löfblad, the leading star
- Johanna Löfblad
- Jonas Daniel Beckman
- Emerentia Jakobina Sjöberg
- Ingeborg Stenbom
- Johan Nyholm
- Christian Freidrich Vougt
- Martha Leuch
- Rutger Ludvig Söderberg
- Jakob Medalliur
- Petter Lind
- Eva Floberg
- Martin Nürenbach, ("with wife"), dancer

== Actors in the troupe of 1780 ==
When the troupe stopped being a traveling theatre troupe and moved into the Eriksbergsteatern in 1780 it was made of:

- Rutger Ludvig Söderberg
- Johanna Löfblad
- Maria Katarina Öhrn, primadonna
- Olof Ljungren, f. 1748
- Ingeborg Ljungren
- Magnus Bonn
- Anders Lundberg
- Petter Johan Lindskog
- Johan Fredrik Scheiderman
- Johan Fredrik Köhn/Kjörn

== See also ==
- Selander Company
