= Peter Lindahl =

Swedish actor and theatre director

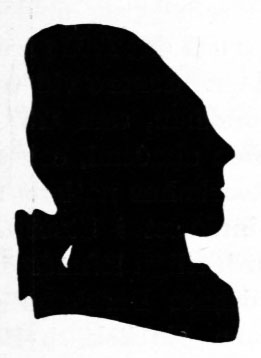
069-Petter Lindahl-Svenska Teatern 1

Peter Lindahl (1712 in Karlskrona – 19 December 1792 in Ånstad, Örebro), was a Swedish stage actor and theatre director. He belonged to the most known of the pioneer generation of actors at the first Swedish theatre. He was the director of the Lindahl theater company in 1754-68, one of the two first travelling Swedish language theater companies.

== Life ==
Peter Lindahl's father was a secretary, as well as he himself before he became an actor.

In 1737, he participated in the first Swedish language original play to be performed at inauguration of the first Swedish theatre in Bollhuset in Stockholm, Den Svenska Sprätthöken by Carl Gyllenborg, in the part of Måns. As such, he was also the first Swedish actor known by name to have performed a part in a different gender, as the male Måns reveals in the play that he is actually as woman, Brita, dressed as a man.

In 1740–54, he was one of the three directors in the board of directors at the theatre with Charles Langlois and Johan Palmberg. He was regarded as a comedian star and the theatre's main Harlequin interpreter, and acted in plays by Molière, Voltaire and Corneille.

In 1754, the Swedish theatre was evicted from the localities of Bollhuset and replaced with the French Du Londel Troupe. The Swedish actors split in two travelling theaters, one under Petter Stenborg and one under Lindahl, the likely first Swedish language travelling troupe, in companionship with Johan Bergholtz.

He married his colleague the actress Margareta Maria Fabritz in 1742. His theatre troupe was taken over by his son-in-law Carl Seuerling in 1768, and later by his daughter, Margareta Seuerling. He and his spouse continued to play in their son-in-law's theatre until the 1780s.
