= Humlegården =

Park in Östermalm, Stockholm, Sweden

Coordinates: 59°20′21″N 18°04′22″E

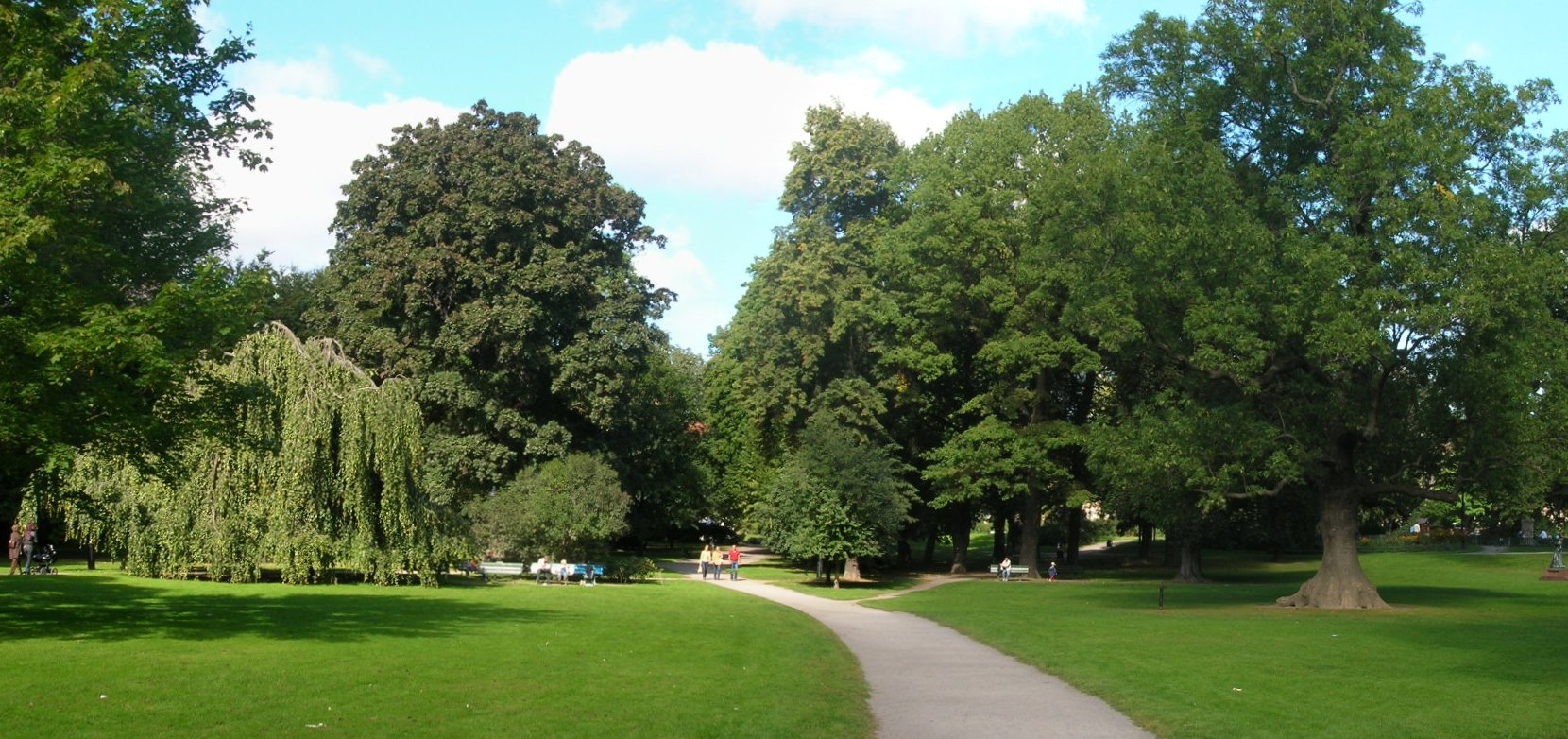
- Humlegården
- Interactive map of Humlegården
- Type: Urban park
- Location: Östermalm, Stockholm, Sweden
- Status: Open all year

Humlegården is a major park in the district of Östermalm in Stockholm, Sweden. The park borders on Karlavägen in the north, Sturegatan in the east, Humlegårdsgatan in the south and Engelbrektsgatan in the west. It is the location of the Swedish Royal Library (Kungliga biblioteket).

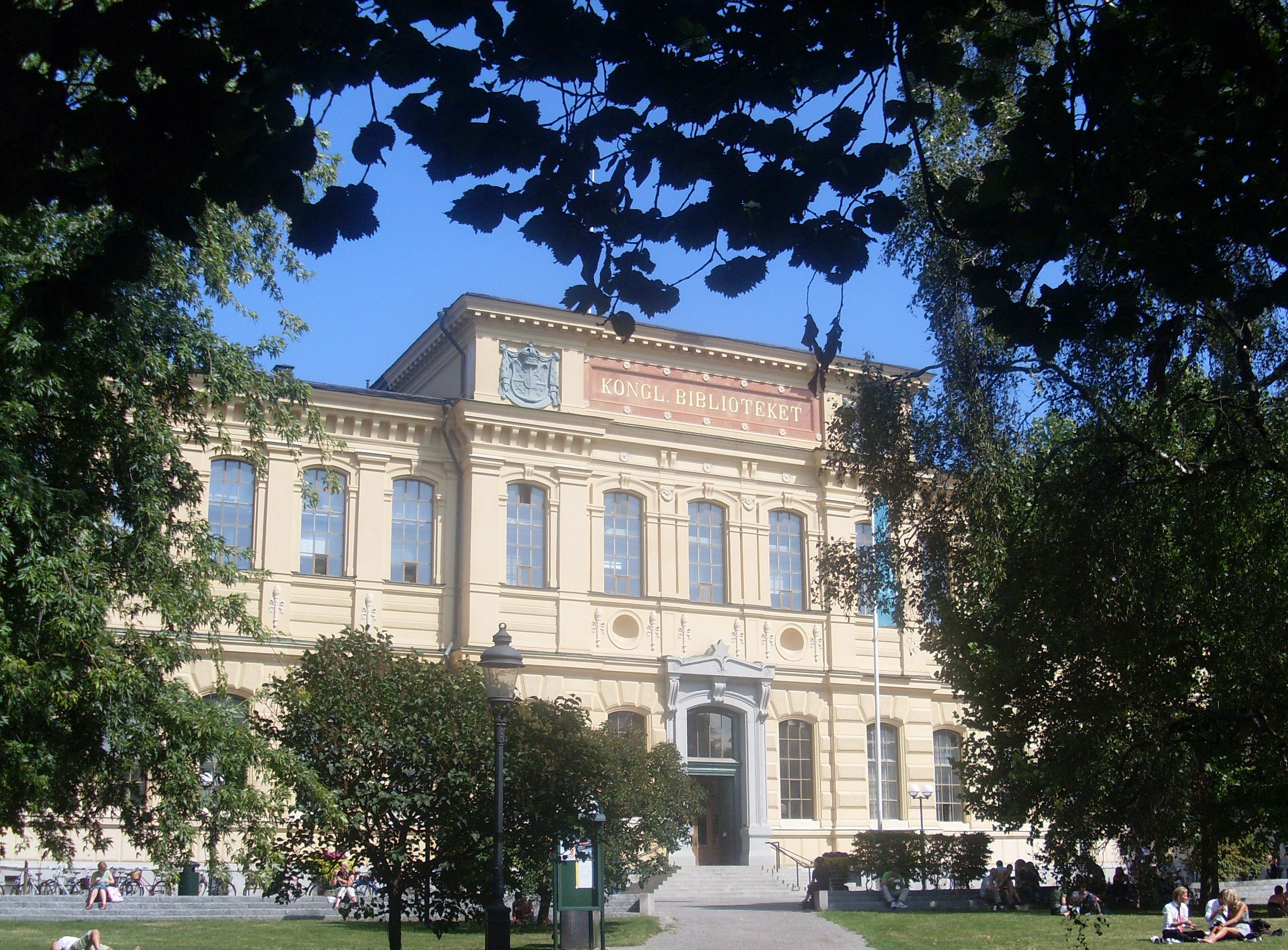
Swedish Royal Library

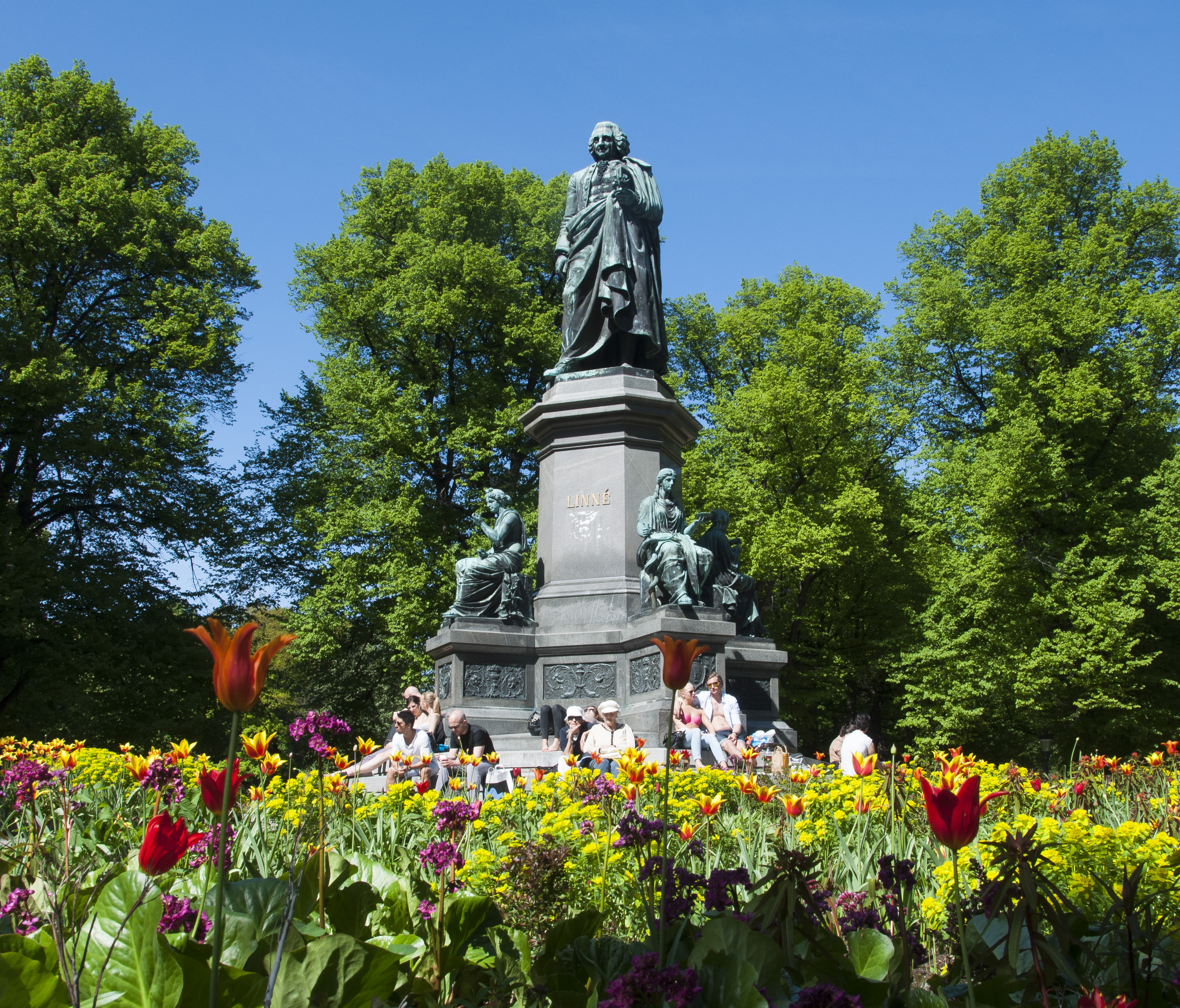
Linnémonumentet

== History ==
=== Royal Park ===
Humlegården was originally the Royal Fruit Garden, established by King Johan III in the 16th century. The name humle, meaning hop, indicates that hops were one of the major plants grown in the garden. In 1686-87, Queen Ulrika Eleonora of Denmark had a pavilion, Rotundan , built there for herself and her children.

=== Recreation Park ===
Already in the 17th century, parts of the park were opened to the public. In 1764, the park was opened for public recreation. There were, however, restrictions on who was allowed to be admitted. From 1773 until 1780, the Stenborg Troupe performed in the Rotundan, in the former pavilion of the queen, then referred to as Humlegårdsteatern (Humlegården theater). From 1853-1877, the Humlegårdsteatern was again in use.

=== Public Park ===
The park was completely opened to the public in 1869. At Engelbrektsplan next to Humlegården, the Djursholm line of the Roslag Railway ended from 1895–1960 and on the other side of the park, on Lidingövägen, the Lidingö Tram line ended from 1914–1967. Today the park is a popular recreational area for locals, hosting a small soccer ground, skateboard ramp, children's playground and lawns.

== Monuments and statues ==
The park is the site of a number of statues. In the centre of the park is Linnémonumentet, a large statue commemorating botanist and zoologist Carl Linnaeus (1707–1778). The monument was designed by Johannes Frithiof Kjellberg (1836-1885) and dates to 1885.

Other notable statues commemorate historian Anders Fryxell (1795–1881), chemist Carl Wilhelm Scheele (1742–1786), author Fredrika Bremer (1801– 1865) and Lutheran priest Peter Wieselgren (1800-1877). Other works include Farfadern by Per Hasselberg (1896), Tuffsen by Egon Möller Nielsen (1949), Isobartema by Martin Holmgren (1970), Cordillera de Los Andes by Francisco Gazitúa (2000) and Hjalmar Söderberg (1869–1941) by Peter Linde (2010).

In 2022, a sculpture to commemorate the life and work of acclaimed Swedish DJ and music producer, Avicii "Standing Waves" was unveiled. The wind sculpture, designed to represent his music, was designed by Adèle Essle Zeiss and Liva Isakson.

== Gallery ==
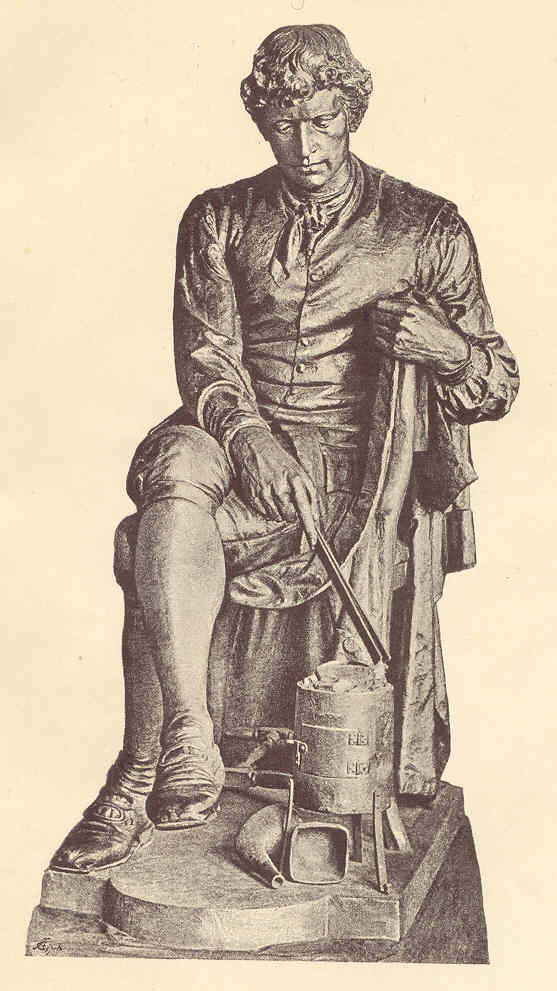
Carl Wilhelm Scheele

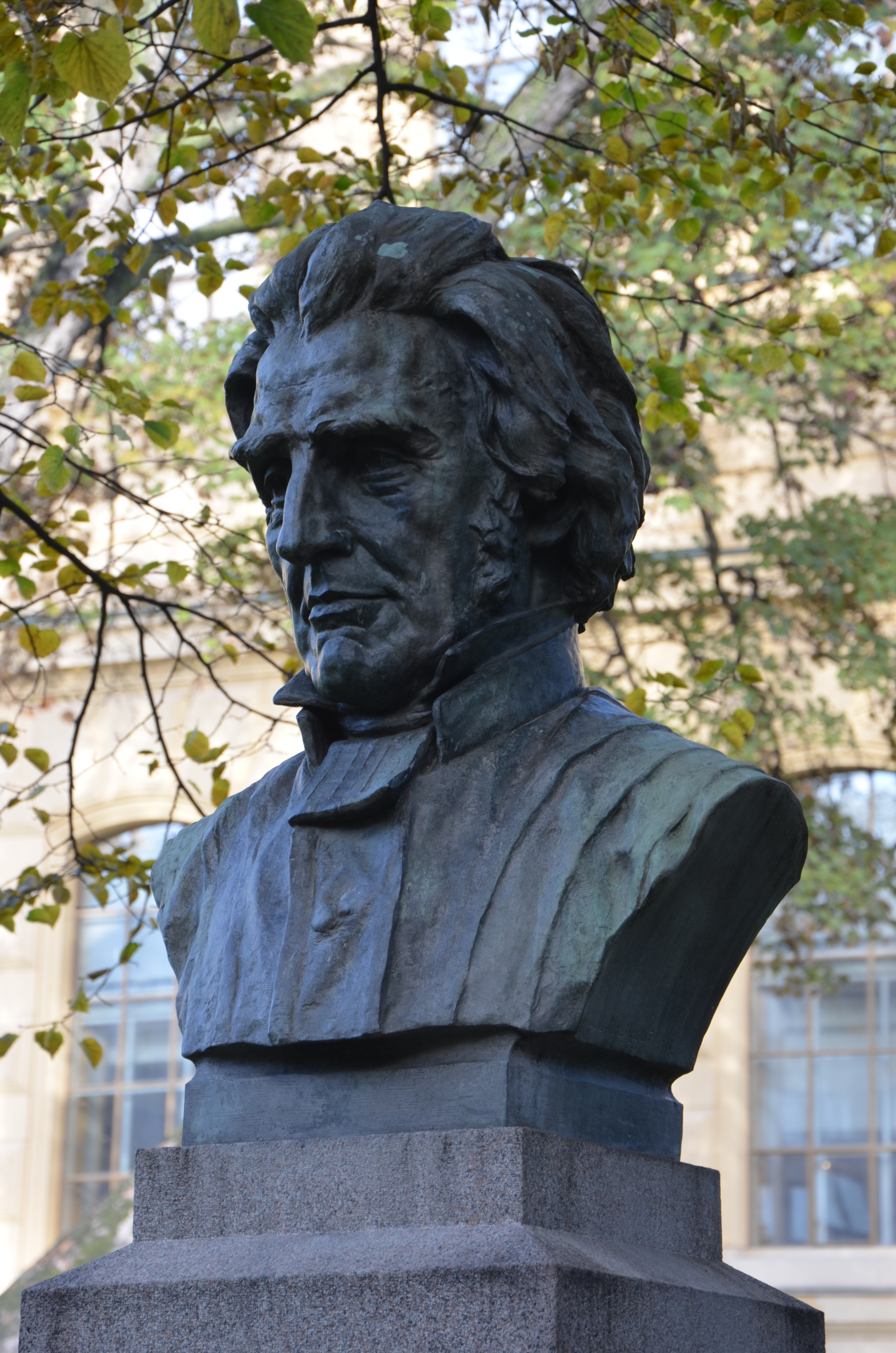
Peter Wieselgren

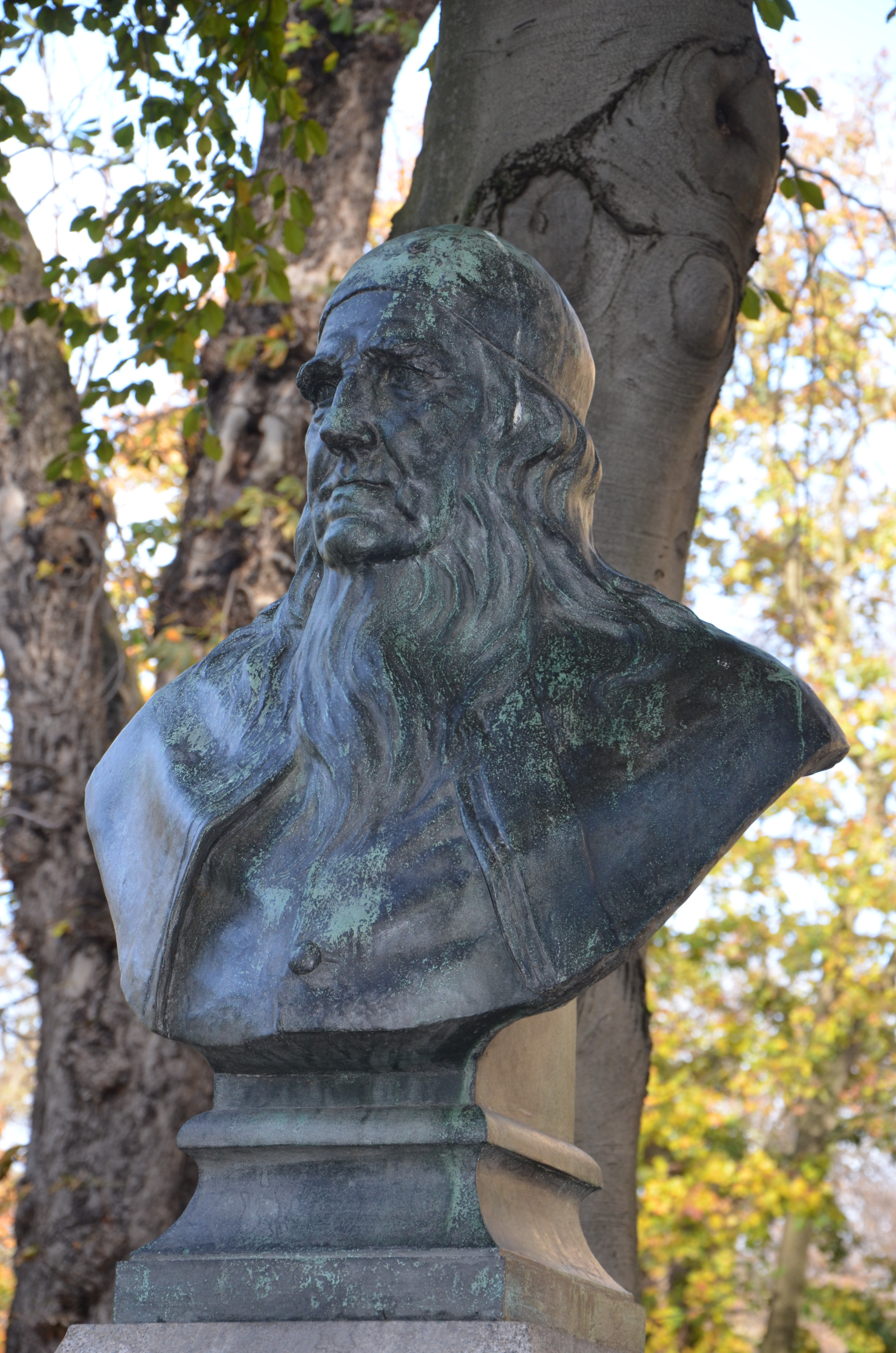
Anders Fryxell

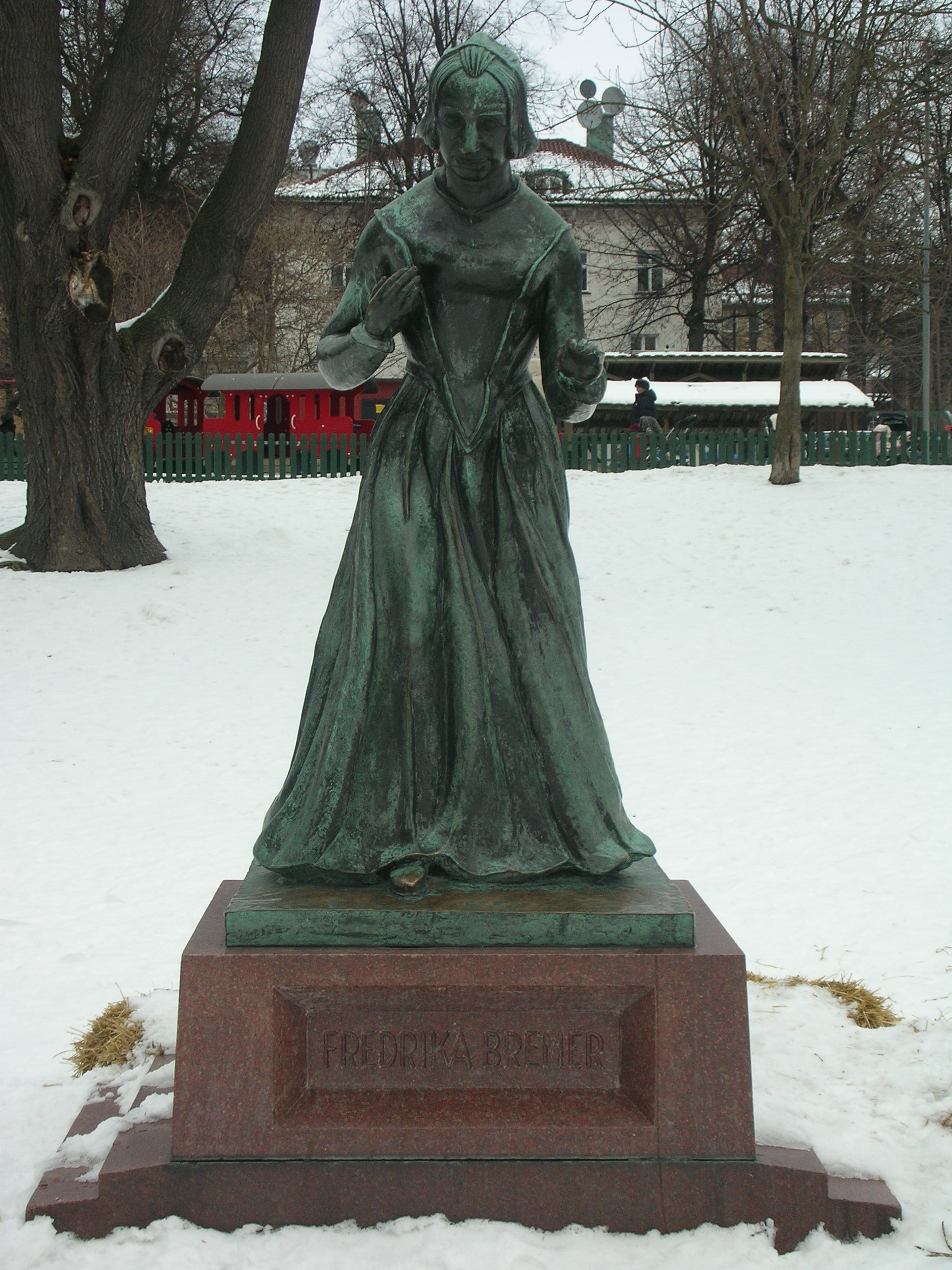
Fredrika Bremer

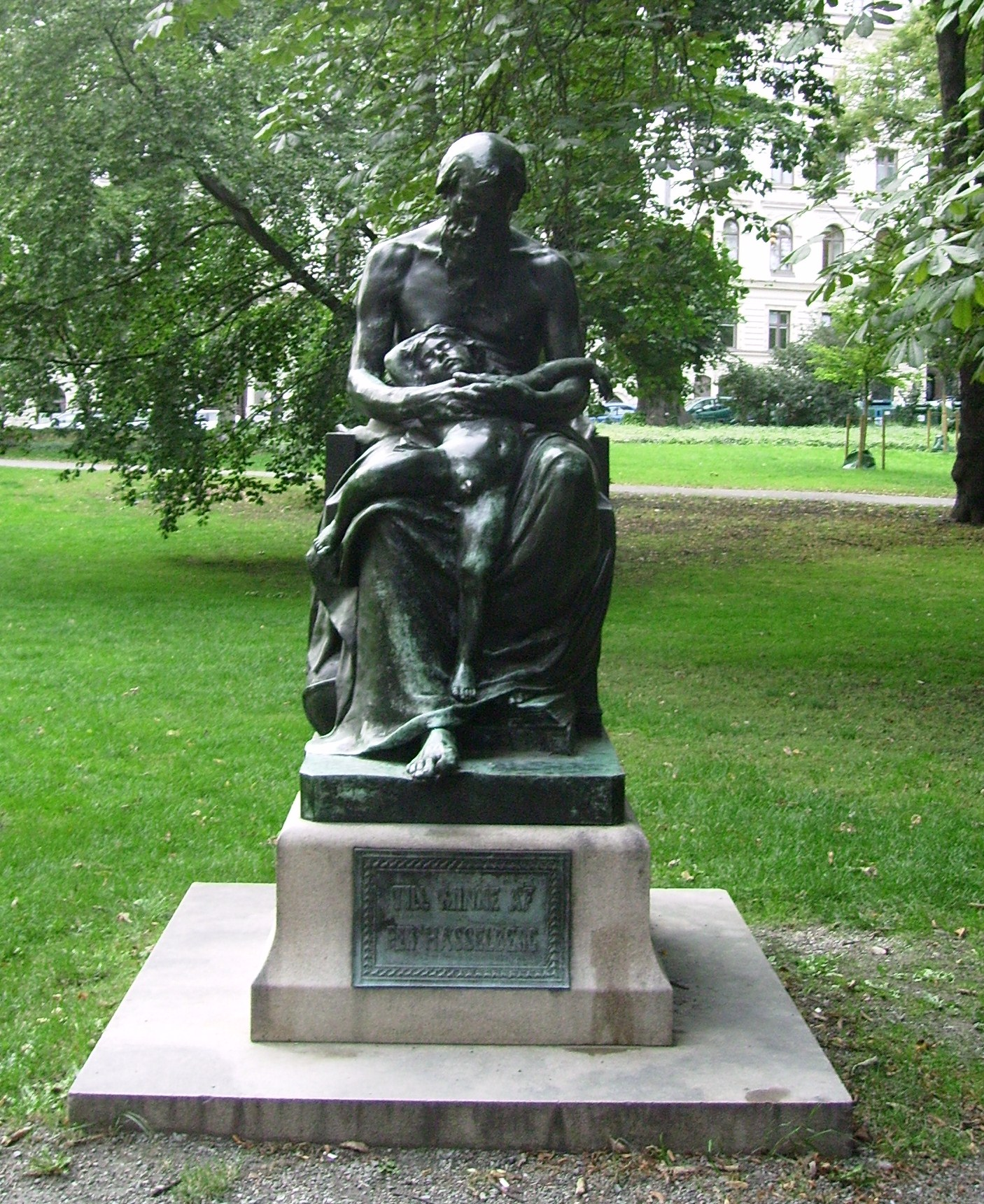
Farfadern

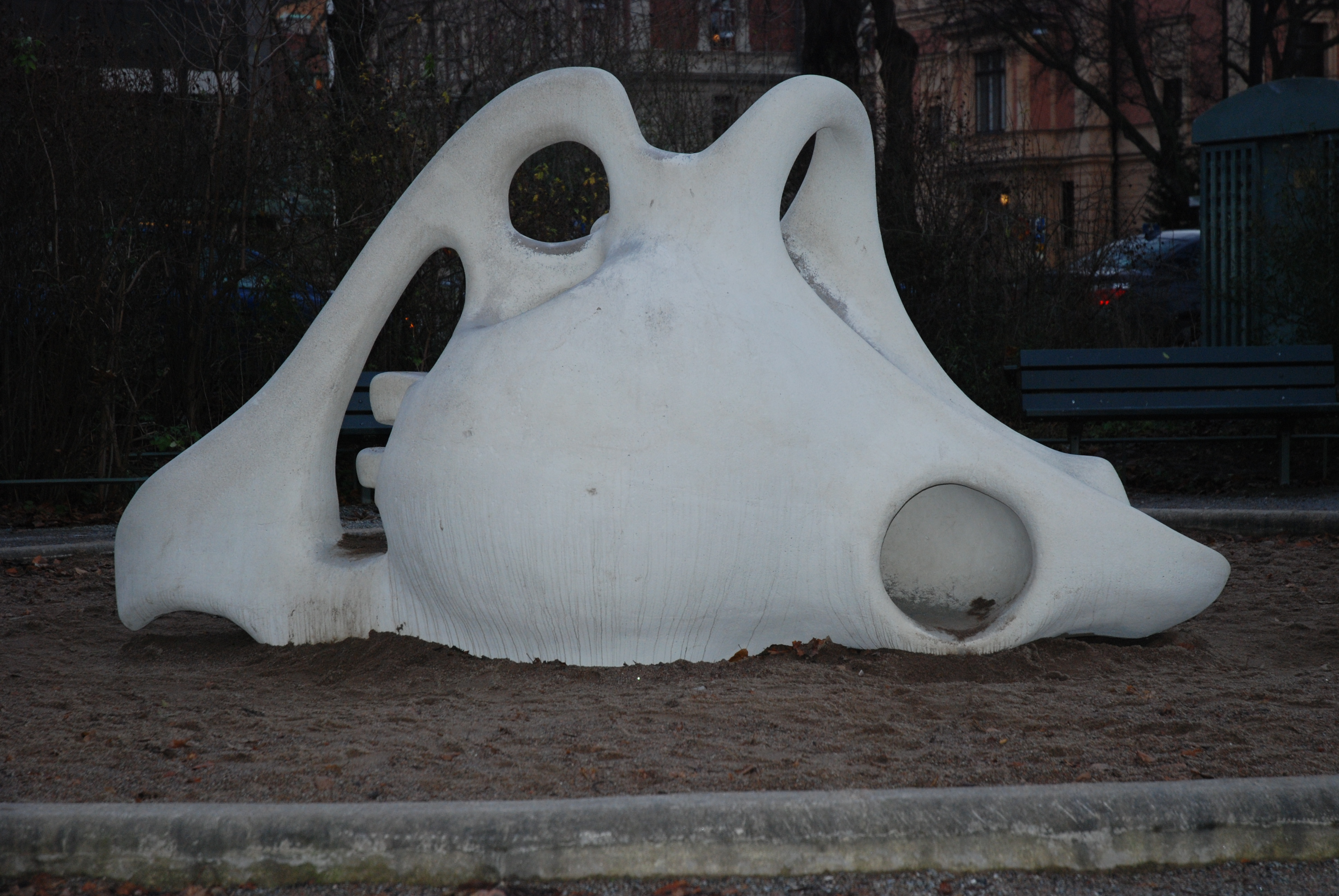
Tuffsen

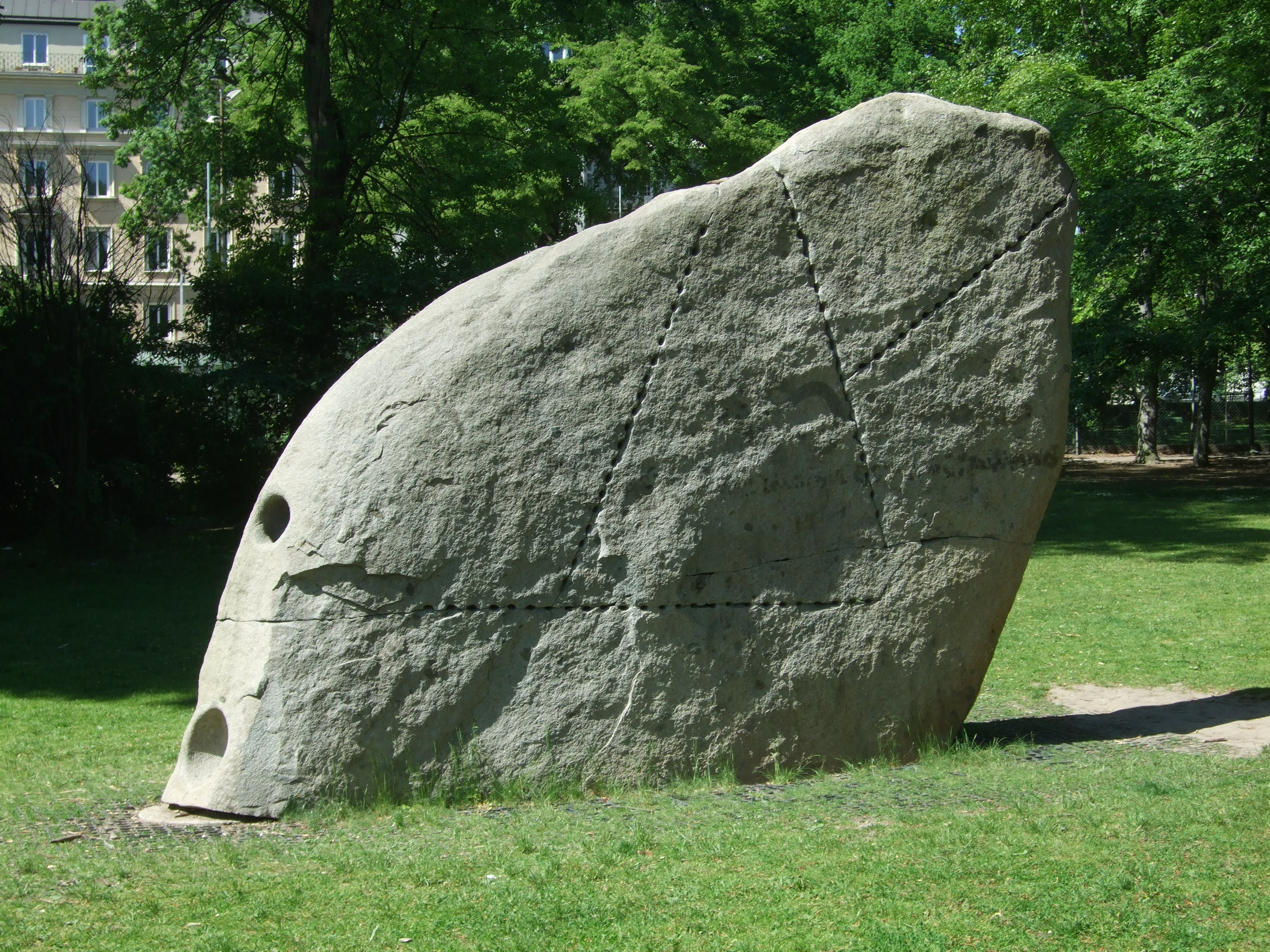
Cordillera de Los Andes

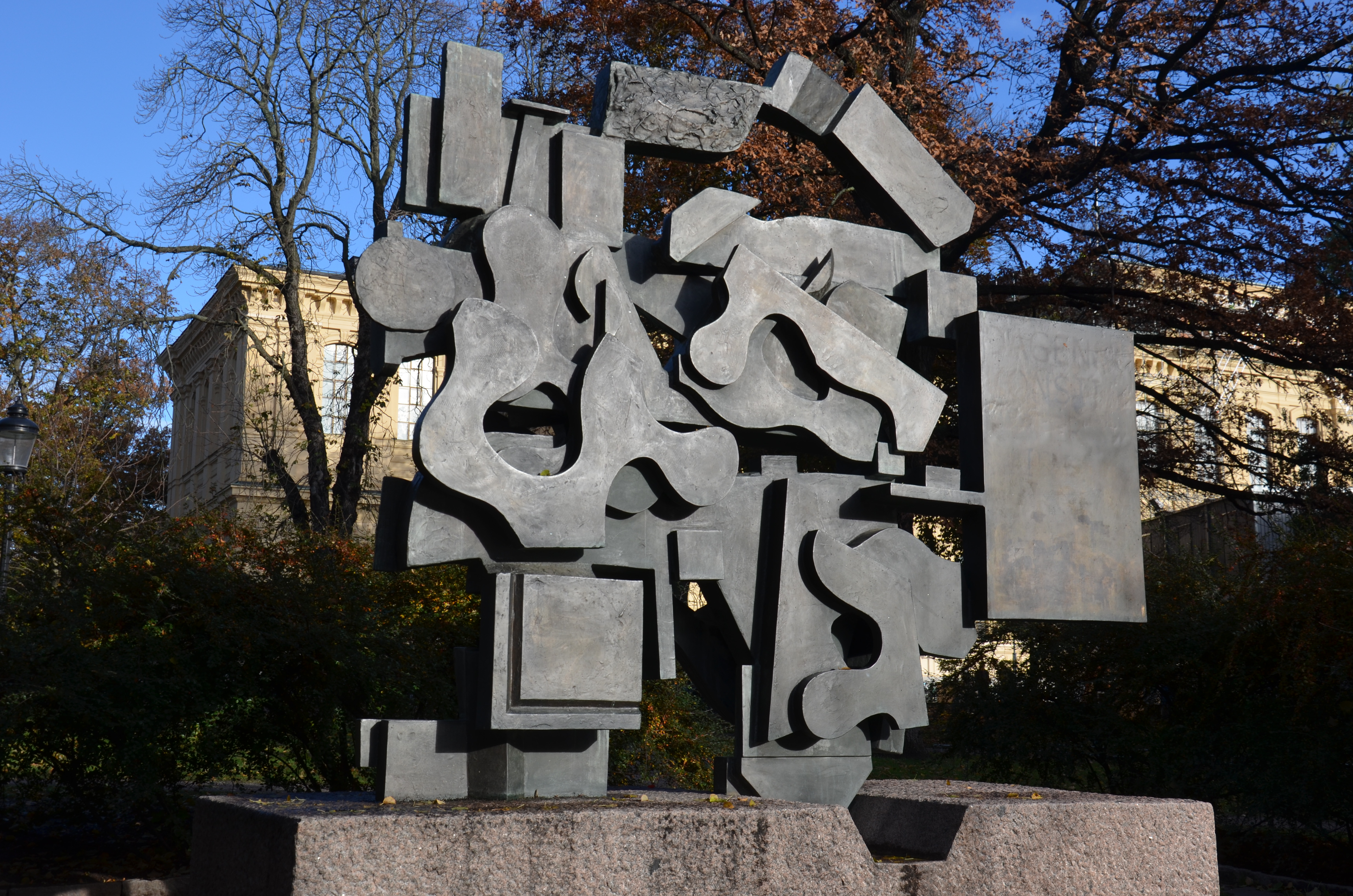
Isobartema

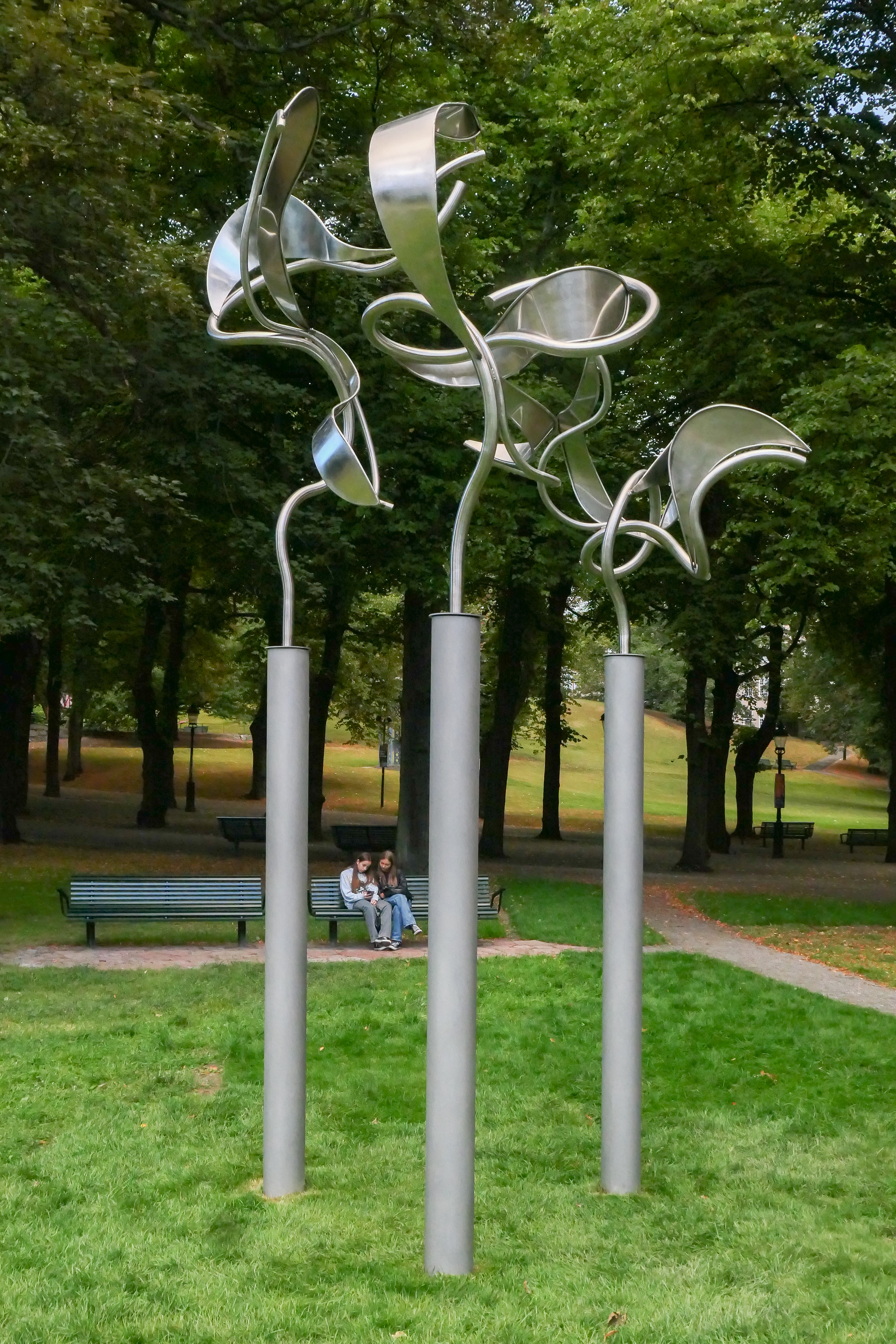
Standing Waves

== Other sources ==
- Johan Flodmark (1893) Stenborgska skådebanorna: bidrag till Stockholms teaterhistoria (Norstedt, Stockholm) (in Swedish)
