= Carl Stenborg =

Swedish opera singer (1752–1813)

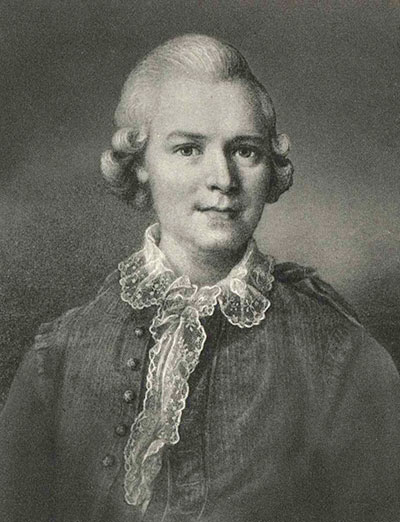

Background information
- Born: 8 September 1752
- Died: 1 August 1813
- Genres: opera
- Occupation(s): singer, composer and theatre director
- Instrument: vocals

Carl Stenborg (8 September 1752 – 1 August 1813) was a Swedish opera singer, composer and theatre director. He belonged to the pioneer generation of the Royal Swedish Opera and was regarded as one of the leading opera singers of the Gustavian era. He was a hovsångare and a member of the Royal Swedish Academy of Music.

== Life ==
Carl Stenborg was born in Stockholm to actor Petter Stenborg, director of the Stenborg Troupe, and Anna Krüger. Of his brothers, Johan Fredrik Stenborg studied at Uppsala University and became an official, and Nils Stenborg became an opera singer.

He received a good education, debuted as a concert singer in Riddarhuset in 1766 and was appointed councillor at the Royal Court of Sweden in 1767. This was considered unusual, since his father was not of wealthy means. Carl's mother had been the housekeeper of the nobleman and statesman Adam Horn (1717-1778). Carl or one of his brothers may have been his son, which was to be the reason why the sons of a poor man had been able to receive such a good education and reach high positions so early in life.

=== Royal Opera ===
When the Royal Swedish Opera was founded in 1773, he played the main male role in Francesco Uttini's opera Thetis och Pélée opposite the primadonna Elisabeth Olin, with whom he had a relationship. He was the leading male star for several years and in 1780 was given a life contract. Although he sang tenor roles, his voice was known for its dexterity and dark timbre and was nearer to that of a baritone.

Carl Stenborg was appointed Hovsångare in 1773, royal secretary in 1782 and was elected to the Royal Swedish Academy of Music in 1783.

=== Stenborg theaters ===
He was the director of his father's theatres in 1780–99: from 1788, he was allowed to perform in them. He was engaged in 1782 and in 1793 he married the singer Betty Olin, daughter of Elisabeth Olin, and performed with her in Copenhagen and Oslo in 1794 and 1795. The engagement had been long because of the unwillingness of Elisabeth Olin to give her consent to the marriage between her daughter and her own former lover.

In 1784 Stenborg's opera Gustaf Ericsson i Dalarna premiered at one of his father's theaters. After the Stenborg Theatre was closed in 1799, he toured the country (1804–09) with his own company.

=== Later life ===
He was given a pension in 1806.

He gave his last performance at a concert on Riddarhuset 27 February 1808, "to the great surprise of everyone" opposite Elisabeth Olin, which now also gave her last performance, and Jeanette Wässelius, with music of the royal chapel, Johann Christian Friedrich Hæffner, Freidrich Müller and his own daughter, the pianist Carolina Stenborg (1798–1869).

He died in Stockholm on 1 August 1813.

== Other sources ==
- Nordisk familjebok / Uggleupplagan. 26. Slöke - Stockholm 1219-1220 on Project Runeberg.
- Kjellberg, Bertil, Beijer, Agne & Andersson, Ingvar (red.), Gustavianskt: [1771-1810], Wahlström & Widstrand, Stockholm, 1945
- Klas Åke Heed, Ny svensk teaterhistoria. Teater före 1800, Gidlunds förlag (2007)
- Kungliga teaterns repertoar 1773-1973 ['Repertoire of the Royal Theatre 1773-1973'], 1974 (Swedish)
- Oscar Levertin: Teater och drama under Gustaf III, Albert Bonniers förlag, Stockholm, Fjärde Upplagan (1920). ['Teater och drama under Gustaf III'] (in Swedish)
- Fredrik August Dahlgren: Förteckning öfver svenska skådespel uppförda på Stockholms theatrar 1737-1863 och Kongl. Theatrarnes personal 1773-1863. Med flera anteckningar. (List of Performances staged at the theatres of Stockholm from 1737 to 18863 and the staff of the royal theatres from 1773 to 1863) (Swedish)
- Jonsson, Leif & Ivarsdotter, Anna (red.), Musiken i Sverige. 2, Frihetstid och gustaviansk tid 1720-1810, Fischer, Stockholm, 1993 (Music in Sweden. The age of Liberty and the Gustavian age 1720–1810) (in Swedish)
- Johan Flodmark: Stenborgska skådebanorna: bidrag till Stockholms teaterhistoria, Norstedt, Stockholm, 1893 (in Swedish)
- Nordensvan, Georg, Svensk teater och svenska skådespelare från Gustav III till våra dagar. Förra delen, 1772-1842, Bonnier, Stockholm, 1917(Swedish theatre and Swedish actors from Gustav III to our days. First book 1772–1842) (Swedish)
