= Francesco Uttini =

Italian composer and conductor (1723-1795)

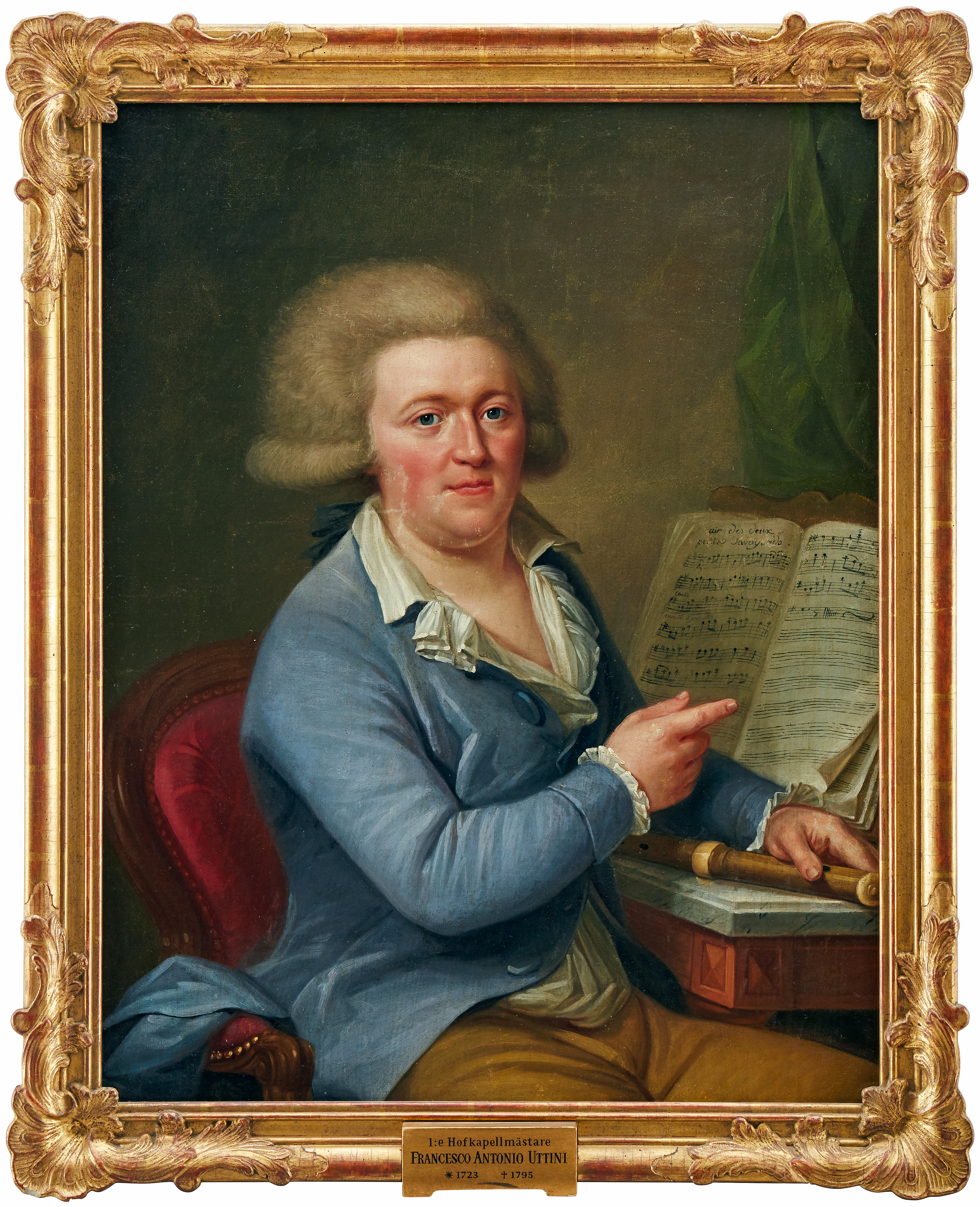
Francesco Uttini, by Adolf Ulrik Wertmüller.

Francesco Antonio Baldassare Uttini (1723 in Bologna – 25 October 1795) was an Italian composer and conductor who was active mostly in Sweden.

He is best remembered today as a composer of operas in both the Italian and Swedish languages and for his five symphonies. He provided the music for the first Swedish grand opera, Thetis och Pelée, which was commissioned by Gustavus III in 1772 and was successfully performed the following year.

He was married first to the opera singer Rosa Scarlatti, and then to the opera singer Sofia Liljegren. He was the father of the ballet dancer Carlo and double bass player Adolpho Ludovico Uttini.

== Works ==
- 1743: Alessandro nelle Indie , opera seria, Genoa
- 1748: Astianatte, dramma seria, Cesena
- 1750: Demofoonte, opera seria, Ferrara
- 1752: Siroe, opera seria, Hamburg
- 1753: L'olimpiade, opera seria, Copenhagen
- 1754: Zenobia, opera seria, Copenhagen
- 1755: La Galatea, opera seria, Drottningholm
- 1755: L'isola disabitata, dramma per musica, Drottningholm
- 1755: Il rè pastore, dramma per musica, Drottningholm
- 1757: L'eroe cinese, opera seria, Drottningholm
- 1757: Adriano in Siria, opera seria, Drottningholm
- 1762: Cythère assiégée, opéra comique, Stockholm
- 1764: Il sogno di Scipione, dramatic serenade, Stockholm
- 1765: Soliman II, ou Les trois sultanes, opéra comique, Stockholm
- 1766: Le gui de chène, opéra comique, Stockholm
- 1766: Psyché, tragédie lyrique, Drottningholm
- 1768: L'aveugle de Palmyre, opéra comique, Drottningholm
- 1773: Thetis och Pelée, grand opera, Stockholm
- 1774: Aeglé, opéra-ballet, Stockholm
- 1774: Birger Jarl och Mechtilde, drama with divertissements, Stockholm
- 1776: Aline, drottning uti Golconda, opera, Stockholm

== Sources ==
- Bertil H. van Boer, Martin Tegen. The New Grove Dictionary of Opera, edited by Stanley Sadie (1992), ISBN 0-333-73432-7 and ISBN 1-56159-228-5
