= Lars Lalin =

Swedish musician, playwright and opera singer

Lars Lalin (1729–1785), was a Swedish musician, playwright and opera singer. He was a hovsångare and a member of the Royal Swedish Academy of Music (1771). He was engaged at the Royal Swedish Opera in 1773–1783.
