= Du Londel Troupe =

French theatre troupe

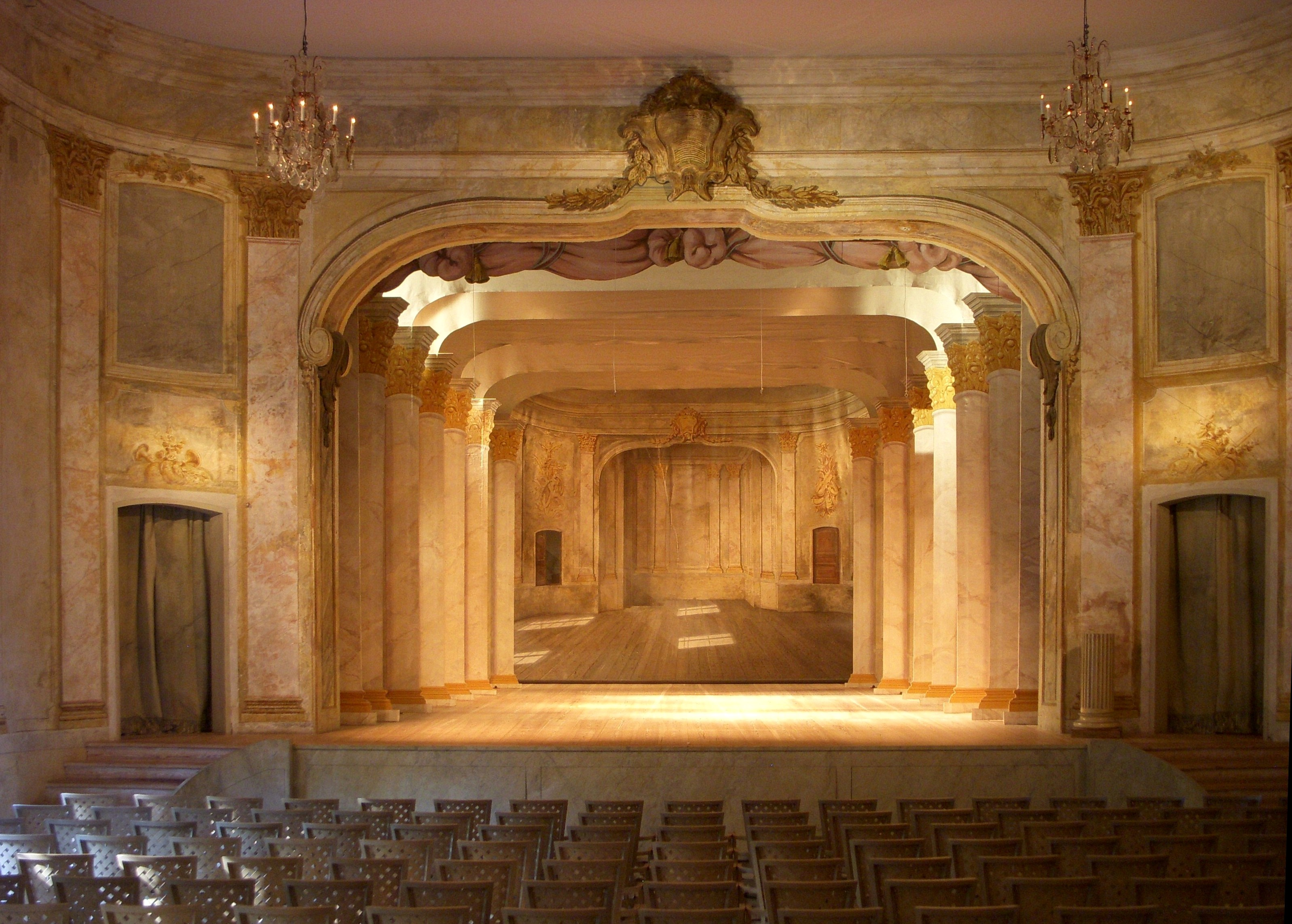
Confidencen.

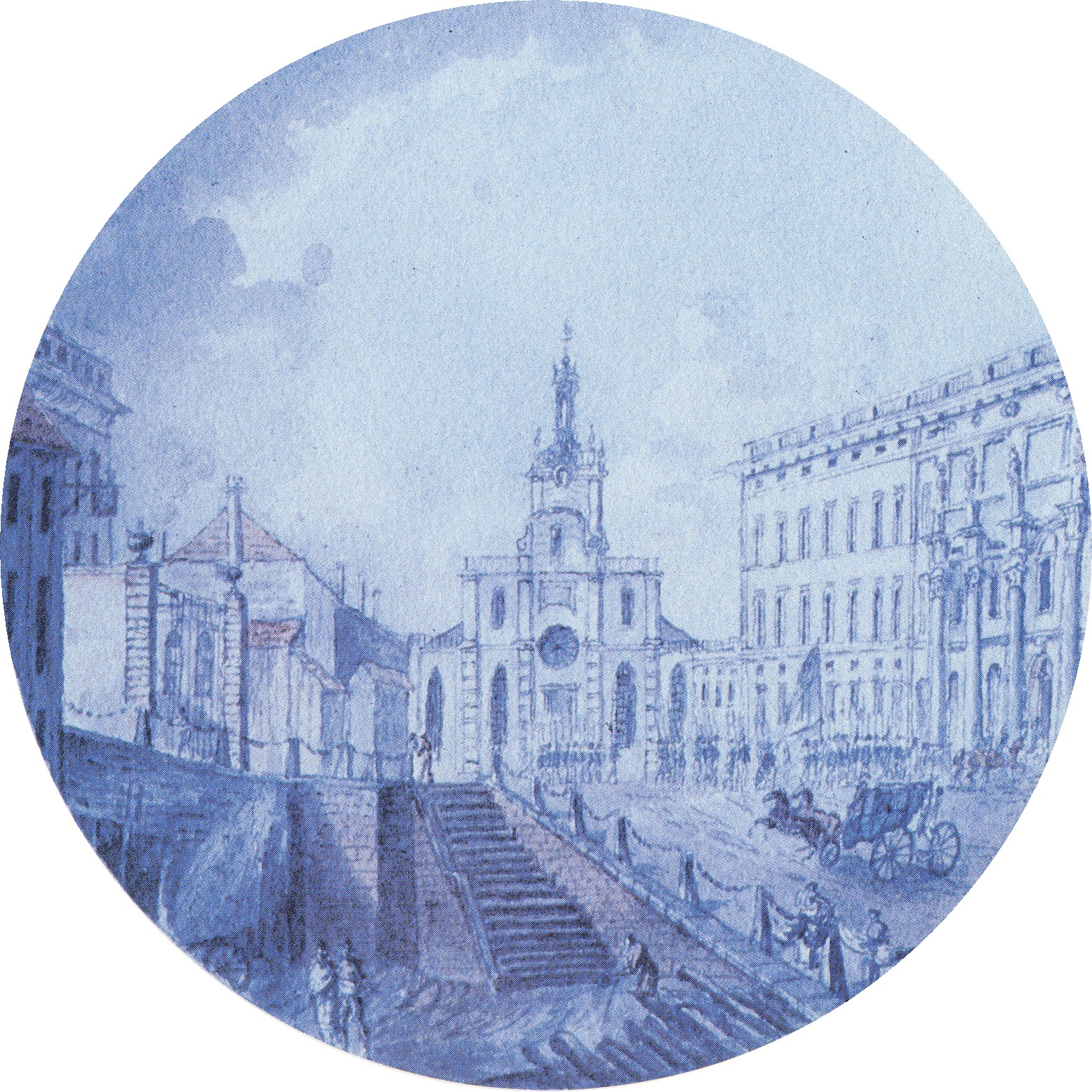
Bollhuset at Slottsbacken in Stockholm during the 1780s. From right to left: Stockholm Palace, Storkyrkan, Bollhuset Theatre and the Tessin Palace. Drawing, Martin Rudolf Heland.

The Du Londel Troupe was a French 18th-century theatre troupe. From 1753 to 1771, it was active as the French Theatre of Sweden, where it played a great part in that country's theatre history.

The French troupe performed in Copenhagen in Denmark in 1748–53. They also performed in Oslo in Norway during the king's stay there in 1749. The troupe was under the leadership of Jeanne Du Londel, widow of Jean Du Londel, and Pierre de Laynay in 1753, when they were invited to Sweden by the initiative of the Swedish queen, Louisa Ulrika of Prussia.

The troupe followed the royal court between the royal palaces and performed on the court- theatres, such as the Drottningholm Theatre and Confidencen, but they also performed for the public in the theatre of Bollhuset in Stockholm during the Winter. After the season of 1753-54, the Stockholm theatre was reserved for them and the Swedish actors were turned out, which interrupted the development of the Swedish language theatre; the Swedish theatre formed the Stenborg Troupe. The Du Londel Troupe performed the latest plays from Paris and also ballets, but they largely remained a pleasure for those who could speak French. In 1771, the French Theatre was dissolved by Gustav III of Sweden, who wished to establish a Swedish-language national theatre.

The Du Londel troupe is mostly remembered in history for interrupting the development of the Swedish theatre and replacing it with a theatre which was only understandable for those who could speak French; but the current view is that they made "The gracious French singing theatre" popular in Sweden, and thereby inspired to the foundation of the Royal Dramatic Theatre and the Royal Swedish Opera.

== See also ==
- La troupe du Roi de Suede
