= Seuerling =

Seuerling is a surname. Notable people with the surname include:

- Carl Seuerling (1727–1795), German-born Swedish stage actor and theatre director
- Charlotta Seuerling (1782/84–1828), Swedish concert singer, harpsichordist, composer and poet
- Margareta Seuerling (1747–1820), Swedish actress and theatre director
