= Fredrique Eleonore Baptiste =

Swedish actress and playwright

Fredrique Eleonore Baptiste (died 27 July 1827), was a Swedish stage actress and playwright active in Finland. She belonged to the star attractions of the Finnish theater in the early 19th century, when theater in Finland was performed by travelling Swedish language theaters. Her plays where successful among travelling theater companies in both Finland and Sweden during the 19th century.

== Family ==
Her parentage is unknown. According to one theory, she was related to Marie Louise Baptiste. She was first married to the actor C. H. Smedberg and, after having divorced him, to the musician Johan Gustaf Lemke (1790-1825), who in 1824-25 managed the Åbo theatre house.

== Stage career ==
Baptiste made her stage debut as a member of the theatre company of Anton Olivier Hoflund in the role of Carolina in Den försonade fadern by Lindegren, in Norrköping on 1 December 1797. Her main career, however, took place in Finland, where theatre was at the time performed by travelling theatre companies from Sweden. She is noted to have performed in Åbo in 1809, and the following years, she was engaged at the theatre companies of Margareta Seuerling, Karl Gustav Bonuvier and Anders Peter Berggrén.

Baptiste was a star attraction of theatre in Finland in the early 19th century. A contemporary wrote about her stage career in Finland:

"...all men at the time where quite taken with her, and her company had such an appeal even backstage, that when a major Blom one theatre evening in Kuopio wentured upon the stage, he found himself offering sweets [to her surrounding guests] right until the time the curtain was to be raised."

== Playwright ==
Fredrique Eleonore Baptiste was also active as a playwright. She translated and reworked old plays, as well as wrote original plays. Her plays where successful in contemporary Sweden and Finland, mainly in travelling theatre companies. She seem to have been active as a playwright prior to her career as an actor. Her play Den unga enkan ('Young Widow') was given 28 times on the Stenborg Theatre in Stockholm in 1794-98. Her most successful plays was reportedly Hugo von Hochberg eller Den ädla uppoffringen ('Hugo von Hochberg or The Noble Sacrifice'), which had its premiere in Åbo in 1819, became very popular and frequently performed until the mid-19th century by travelling Swedish theatre companies in Sweden and Finland such as those of Karl Gustav Bonuvier, Anders Peter Berggrén, Josef August Lambert, Erasmus Petter Sjövall and Erik Wilhelm Djurström. At least seven of her plays are known, but her work was long forgotten in history. She was also a published poet - she had her own verses published at least once, in the paper in Linköping in 1811.

== Private life ==
Fredrique Eleonore Baptiste was described as a talented and intelligent beauty with great learning. According to adverts in the papers, she brought with her a private book collection during her tours and loaned it out as a travelling library. She was reportedly respected by the local upper class in the cities she visited and invited as a guest in their homes, something unusual in an epoch when actors - particularly female actors - generally had a low social status.

She died from edema 27 July 1827 in Vaasa.

== Plays ==
- »Den unga enkan»
- »Adelheid von Wulfingen, en händelse ur det trettonde århundradets tyranni»,
- »Louise eller Den af ödet på en gång gynnade och vanlottade flickan»
- »Den oskyldiga förmätenheten»
- »Högmodet eller Den falska stoltheten»
- »Franz von Hill eller Bröderne af det hemliga förbundet»
- »Hugo von Hochberg eller Den ädla uppoffringen»
