= Move of capital of Finland from Turku to Helsinki =

The move of the capital of Finland from Turku to Helsinki was one of the first central actions of the Grand Duchy of Finland (1809 - 1917). The move was first suggested in 1810, and Helsinki was proclaimed the new capital in April 1812.

The new status of Helsinki as the capital of Finland was emphasised by first moving the Senate of Finland and its offices to Helsinki in the 1810s and later also moving the Imperial Alexander University, previously known as the Royal Academy of Turku, to Helsinki in the 1820s. The capital status was also evident in the architecture: Helsinki was made prominent with new stone buildings, rectangular city blocks and wide streets. The city construction was made more unified, and wooden building areas were clearly separated from the stone-built centre. The old Swedish-era buildings disappeared almost completely, and Helsinki drew impression especially from St. Petersburg.

Officially the construction was led by the reconstruction committee of Helsinki, which was founded in late 1810 in order to rebuild the city after the destructive fire of November 1808. The architectural needs increased when Helsinki was made into the new capital. For the most part, the architectural style of Helsinki with its Empire style buildings was born from the cooperation of committee members Johan Albrecht Ehrenström and Carl Ludvig Engel.

== Background ==
As a consequence of the Finnish War from 1808 to 1809 Finland had become a part of the Russian Empire, and the era of Swedish rule in Finland had ended. In the treaty of Fredrikshamn, Sweden ceded the entire area of Finland to Russia. In 1809 Turku was made into the location of the central government of the Grand Duchy of Finland, the first capital city of autonomous Finland primarily because it was the centre of trade and sea travel in Finland, and it was the location of the Royal Academy of Turku and the district court.

=== Turku's status as capital of Finland ===
Although Turku only had time to be the official capital of the Grand Duchy of Finland from 1809 to 1812, its status as the de facto capital of Finland had been seen as undisputed during the era of Swedish rule. It had never been officially proclaimed as the capital of the eastern part of Sweden at the time, and in practice the capital was located in Stockholm, but in any case Turku had been the administrative centre of Finland since Mediaeval times. In the 17th century Turku also got a district court and a university, and it was the first, and up to the 19th century the only university city in Finland.

Founded in the late 13th century, Turku is the oldest city in Finland, whereas Helsinki was only founded in 1550. In the early 19th century the civilian population of Turku was over three times that of Helsinki: Helsinki had a population of 3200, while Turku had a population of 11000. Turku was an active trade and port city with an industry already forming. When Helsinki had been founded, its purpose had primarily been military.

== Move ==
=== Rationale ===
From the Russian viewpoint, Turku was located too near Finland's former host country of Sweden and its capital Stockholm. This proximity was evident in both geographic and historical ties: the Russians especially saw the student body of the Royal Academy of Turku as too Swedish-minded. A search for a new capital for Finland started, in order to write a new beginning for the newly founded Grand Duchy of Finland. Promising options included Helsinki as well as Hämeenlinna, Loviisa, Porvoo, Vaasa and Vyborg.

The first proposal of Helsinki as the new capital was made by Gustaf Fredrik Stjernvall, who had been appointed as the new governor of the Nyland and Tavastehus County in spring 1810: in October 1810 he made a document for the secretary of state Mikhail Speransky, in which he pointed out the extensive reconstruction of Helsinki and also proposed that it should be made the new capital. According to Stjernvall, the city should be rebuilt as bigger than before and have more stone buildings, which required outside funding and guidance. He emphasised the excellent location of Helsinki and the protection provided by the Sveaborg fortress on the sea in front of it; the fortress would also provide protection for the city of St. Petersburg, the capital of the entire empire. Stjernvall also emphasised that the city could already support a large Russian garrison. A further advantage for Helsinki was that it was now possible to rebuild it freely in a way suited for a new capital, because the accidental fire in November 1808 had destroyed a large part of the city. The Russians also saw the port of Helsinki as excellent: during the Swedish rule up to the early 19th century it had developed into the fourth most important import port in the Swedish realm after Stockholm, Gävle and Gothenburg. The state of mind of the Helsinkians, particularly the bourgeoisie, was described as accepting of the changes.

=== Reconstruction committee ===
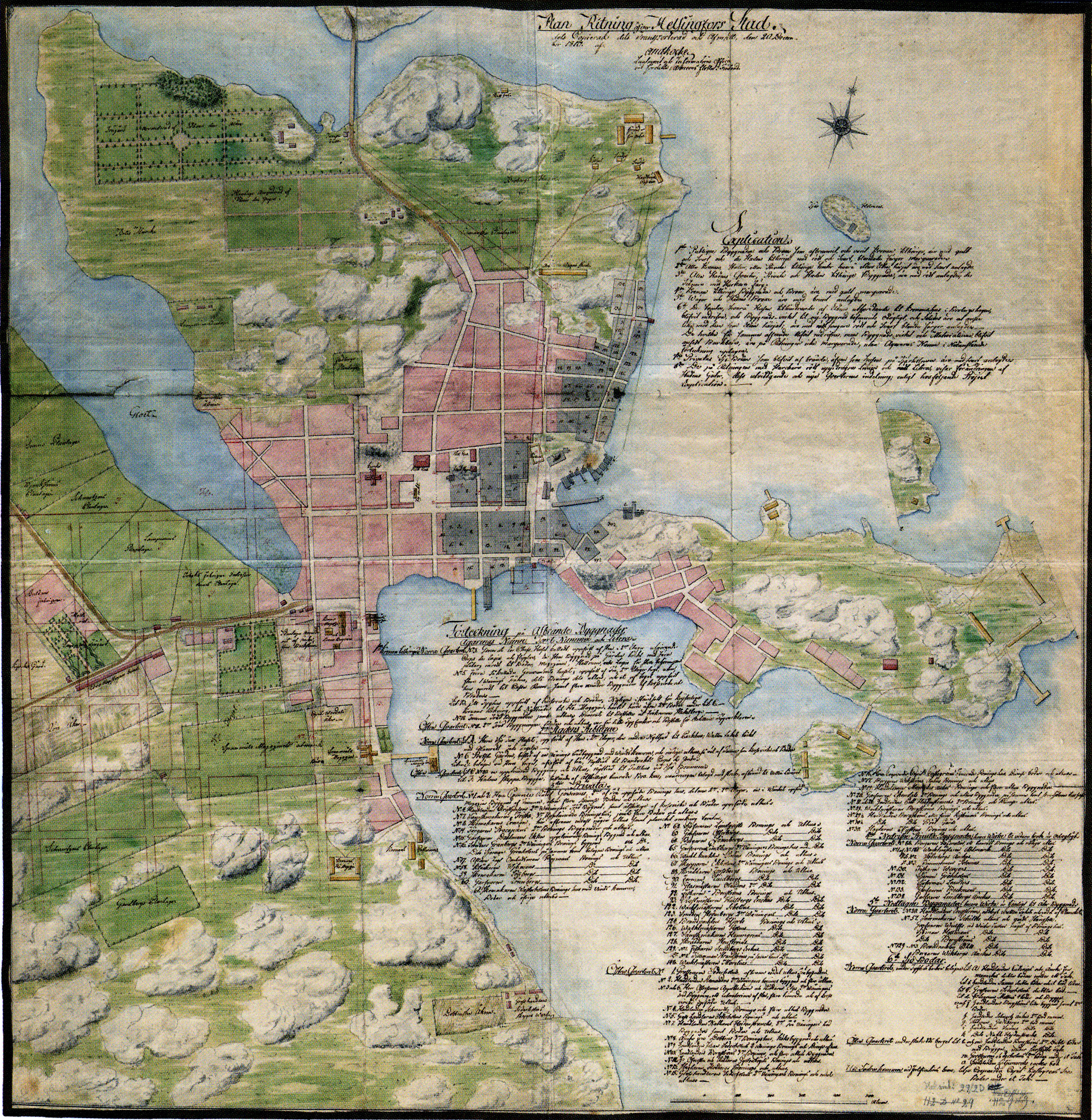
A proposal for a zoning plan drawn by lieutenant of the artillery Anders Kocke from 1810. The new street network has been drawn with dim lines on top of the map. This plan was also known as the Steinheil-Kocke zoning plan.

The imperial officials did not comment on the issue of moving the capital for the moment, but in order to plan for the reconstruction the emperor set up a committee on 12 November 1810. Its mission was to make a zoning plan, deal out lots for the inhabitants and make an estimate about the construction costs. The committee consisted of the Governor-General of Finland, officials of the central administration and the bourgeoisie in Helsinki, in order to represent a wide selection of the community. The Russian general Fabian Steinheil, who had been appointed as Governor-General of Finland, was appointed as the director of the committee, and the committee also included Stjernvall and two members of the bourgeoisie, the judicial mayor Johan Adolf Strömberg and the merchant Carl Magnus Lindholm. Steinheil and Stjernvall were appointed to oversee the general benefit, while Strömberg and Lindholm pointed out points of view of the city's inhabitants.

The committee first met at Steinheil's home in Turku in December 1810. As the committee was not prepared for anything but a superficial discussion about the zoning plan, the task of making a proposal for a zoning plan was given to the lieutenant Anders Kocke who was seen as an expert. The proposal was completed during December, and during the start of the next year it was renewed twice. It was delivered to emperor Alexander I in late January 1811. Because of financial reasons, the proposal was quite modest; for example the old street network in the city centre with its irregular and different-sized blocks was mostly left as it was. The city centre was mostly located in the area of Kruununhaka on the Vironniemi peninsula.

The emperor approved Kocke's plan on 23 February 1811, and at the same time the committee was reorganised: Stjernvall was appointed as the new director and mayor Strömberg became the deputy director. Lieutenant Kocke became the architect of the committee, and Carl Lindholm and the merchant Henrik Jakob Govinius were selected as representatives of the city. The committee's new mission was to inspect the proposed building drawings and to oversee the construction and that the budgeted money would only be spent on the intended purpose. In addition, the committee had to acquire the necessary supplies for construction, so it had a duty to found brick factories and limestone mines if need would arise. The committee was overseen by the governor-general Steinheil, whom the committee had to deliver an annual activity report to. The committee had no connections to the government of Finland as such: there was fear that the government in Turku would oppose the move of the capital, and so the committee members were satisfied with handling matters with the emperor through the governor and the governor-general. After Stjernvall's death in 1815 the office of the governor was separated from the committee, placing the committee as a direct subject of the governor-general.

The committee members did not receive a salary for their work, but their work was appreciated; the merchant Lindholm was awarded the title of commercial councillor, and both Strömberg and Kocke got a pumice ring. The reconstruction work was delayed by the acquisition of supplies as well as the 1811 discussion about moving the capital: the committee did not know whether Helsinki would become the new capital. The insufficient funds appointed for the project also delayed the work; for example, there were no funds appointed for the street reorganisation work including explosions. As well as this, the proposed zoning plan which had already been approved by the emperor remained incomplete, it was renewed during summer and autumn 1811.

=== Armfelt and Ehrenström ===
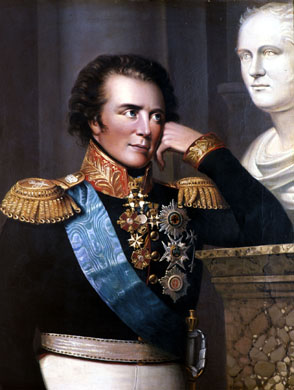
Gustaf Mauritz Armfelt

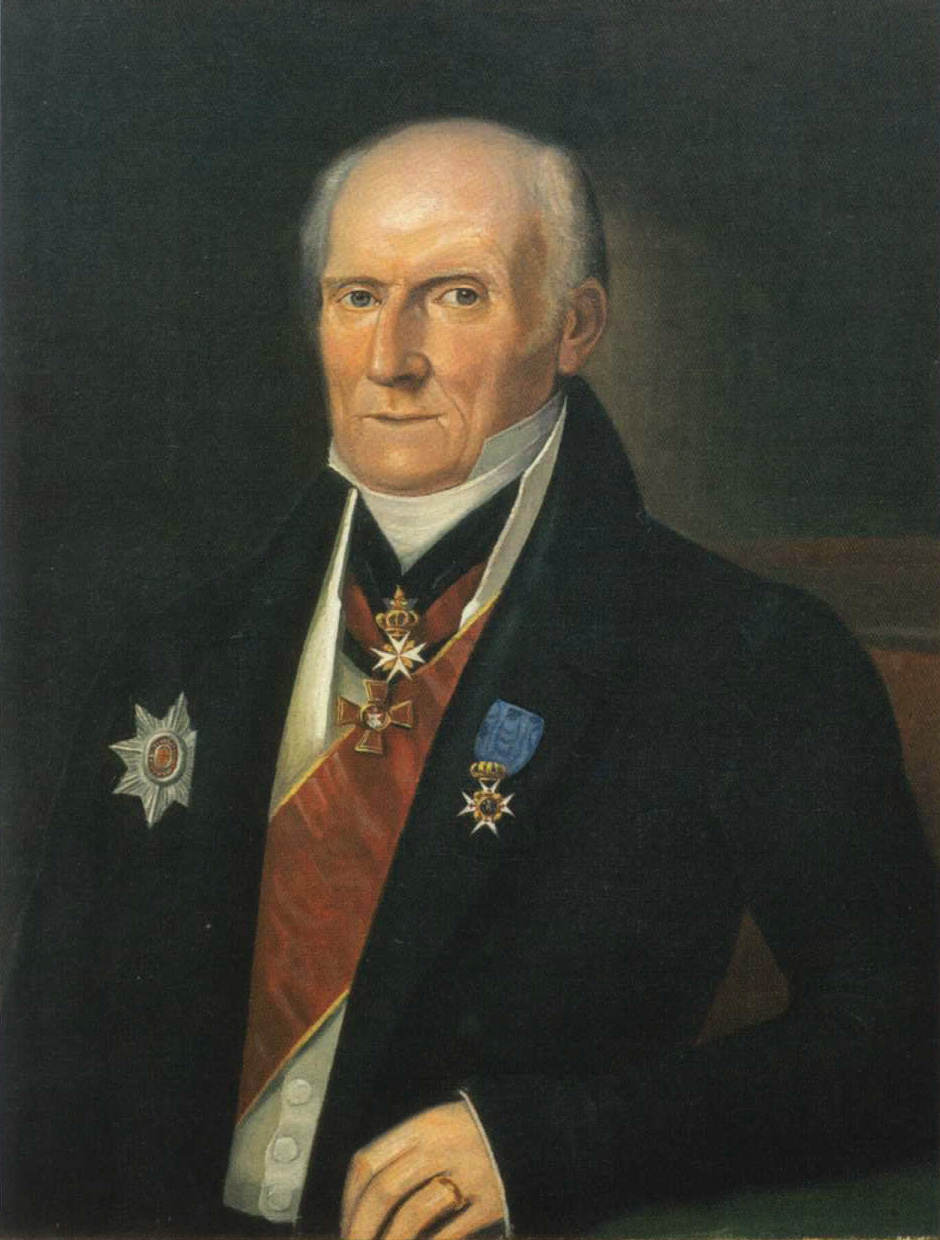
Johan Albrecht Ehrenström

In April 1811 Stjernvall met Gustaf Mauritz Armfelt who had just arrived in Finland and reassured him with his ideas of Helsinki as the capital. Armfelt, who was a member of the high-ranking nobility, had served in numerous duties under the king of Sweden Gustaf III and his son Gustaf IV Adolf but had later decided to move permanently to Finland mainly because he could not accept the French marshal Jean-Baptiste Bernadotte as the new king as a result of the coup of 1809. By June 1811 Armfelt negotiated with emperor Alexander I about moving the capital and the Senate of Finland to Helsinki. At first, the emperor was doubtful about moving the senate to Helsinki. Armfelt felt sure that the matter would be settled by September 1812 when the Diet of Finland should assemble.

Armfelt felt antipathy towards his former university city of Turku and felt that moving the capital to Helsinki as important in building a Finnish political identity separate of both Sweden and Russia. In October 1811 he became the director of the Committee for Finnish Affairs in St. Petersburg. In November Armfelt wrote to Stjernvall that he felt as if the emperor would be warming to the idea of Helsinki as the new capital. Armfelt and the emperor Alexander I had become friends, and Armfelt described working together with the emperor as heavenly. Also the secretary of the state Robert Henrik Rehbinder had a central role in proposing the construction plans for the new capital to the emperor.

In autumn 1811 Armfelt invited his Helsinki-born friend Johan Albrecht Ehrenström who had been living in Sweden to move back to Finland and to get familiar with the situation of the city. Armfelt asked Ehrenström for a statement about the committee's proposed zoning plan which had already been approved. In his statement Ehrenström emphasised Helsinki's fitness for a new capital and described its potential to rise as one of the largest market cities on the Baltic Sea. With such grandious plans, the emperor was given an opportunity to show his power and grace. After reading the statement, Stjernvall became interested in Ehrenström's thoughts and asked him to join the meeting of the reconstruction committee in January 1812 where he was asked to make a new proposed zoning plan.

The proposed zoning plan was completed fast, and a central part of it was a clear-cut division between the stone-built city centre and the wooden-built Uusimaa suburb on the other side of the Esplanadi park; Ehrenström sought to straighten the city blocks as rectangular and wanted to prevent building wooden buildings at the city centre. The Esplanadi park was meant to act as a fire safety shield between the stone and wooden parts of the city. The Senate Square was planned as the new central square of the city. A new main venue called Unioninkatu led from the north to the south to the Senate Square, named after the union between Finland and Russia.

=== Political situation ===
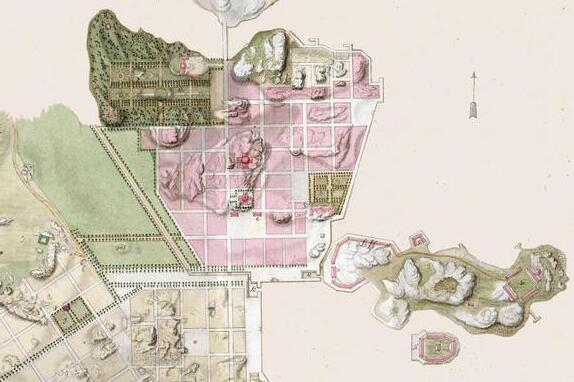
A zoning plan drawn under the leadership of Johan Albrecht Ehrenström in 1812. This plan was also drawn by Anders Kocke.

The elite government in Turku strongly opposed the idea of moving the capital to Helsinki, because many of the members of the Senate of Finland owned manor houses in Finland Proper. The Russians tried to win the Turku elite over with appointments to high-ranking government offices and medals of honour, because if a new war between Russia and Sweden were to break out, there was fear that the Turku elite would side against Russia. Thus the important support of the elite would be lost if the capital had already been moved to Helsinki at that point.

Up to the Treaties of Tilsit in 1807 Russia had been an ally of the First French Empire led by Napoleon. When the relations between Russia and France started to become more tense, the situation of the entire Baltic Sea area grew uncertain. In Russia there was fear that Sweden would launch a new retribution war with French support in order to conquer Finland back. In Sweden there was hope that Carl XIV John who had been elected as heir to the throne in autumn 1810 and who had been among Napoleon's most trusted generals could get Napoleon to support the war. However, Carl XIV John felt conquering Norway was more important and made a secret pact with Russia on 5 April 1812. When the threat of a new war and the need to please the Turku elite disappeared, the capital could at last be moved.

=== Imperial approval ===
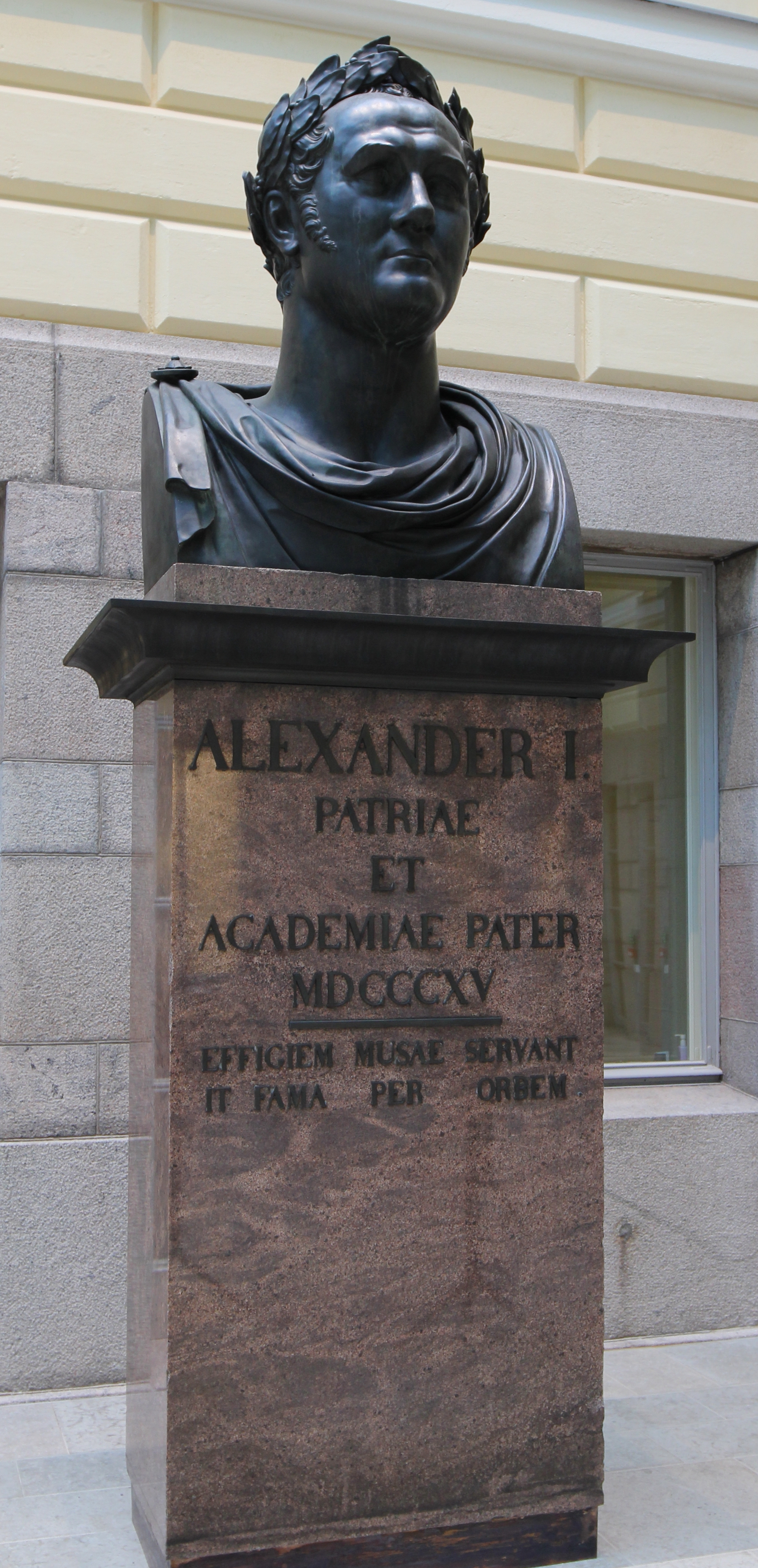
A bust of Alexander I in Helsinki, in which the emperor is described as "the father of the fatherland and the academy". Alexander I visited Helsinki three times: in 1809, 1812 and 1819.

In spring 1812 Stjernvall and commercial councillor Lindholm delivered Ehrenström's notes and the proposal for a new zoning plan to St. Petersburg. They also brought the old proposal for a zoning plan amended with a note that it had failed to please the reconstruction committee and was not worthy of the city. In contrast, Ehrenström's plan had been developed in parallel with the idea of a new capital and according to the notes, it had been designed "-- in every aspect worthy of the High Lord under whose High approval it would be subject to." The Senate of Finland was not asked for their opinion.

Emperor Alexander I approved the plan on 2 April 1812 and appointed Helsinki as the new capital on 8 April 1812. The decision was put to action with two separate letters of order: in the first, Helsinki was appointed as the new capital of Finland, and in the second, it was ordered to be built according to Ehrenström's zoning plan. Ehrenström was also appointed as the new director of the construction committee: Stjernvall had resigned from his post earlier in March, because as he was living in Hämeenlinna he had found it difficult to lead the operations in Helsinki. He had proposed Ehrenström as his successor, and the Committee for Finnish Affairs had unanimously supported the proposal.

The viewpoints of Armfelt, Ehrenström and Stjernvall had a clear influence on the emperor as he thought of all of them as his trustees. Fabian Steinheil thought Helsinki's location as suitable for a new capital but proposed that the project should be postponed to the future because of financial reasons: according to Steinheil Turku already had premises suitable for a government and there would not be enough money for construction work in the new capital. However, the notes of the reconstruction committee falsely noted that the entire committee including Steinheil had supported the move of the capital. Steinheil did not indicate any dissatisfaction with the decision to move the capital that the emperor had already approved, and he called Ehrenström as his friend. Steinheil resigned from his post only in 1823, and he was succeeded by Arseny Zakrevsky, who had a much more negative view of the committee.

== Start of construction ==
Ehrenström started leading the reconstruction of the city as the new director of the committee on 1 May 1812. At the time, Helsinki had about 4000 inhabitants and only 11 stone buildings. For the construction work, the emperor gave him a grant of 200 thousand rubles and set up a loan of one million rubles without charging interest to further private construction.

Ehrenström was in constant correspondence with Armfelt. They both represented the highest nobility that had returned from Sweden, the new national elite in Finland. Armfelt acquired funds for the construction and also gave Ehrenström moral support and encouragement. After Armfelt had died in 1814, the most important supporters of the project for a new capital were Robert Henrik Rehbiner and Carl Johan Walleen who had been part of the Committee for Finnish Affairs. Another member of the Committee for Finnish Affairs who gave his support was Lars Gabriel von Haartman.

Ehrenström, who sought to make the city above all prominent with wide streets and open squares, finished his zoning plan from 1812 to 1817. He hoped to get Carl Ludvig Engel, whom he had met in October 1814 and was currently working as an architect in Turku to help him:

-- [Engel's] abilities surpass all my hopes. He has brought some of his drawings with him, and my attention concentrated on their sublime and pure taste and especially the rare and elegant way they had been drawn in and which parallels the best of what I have seen of this form of art. -- If we do not get a man like Mr. Engel here, there is no hope for the new capital of Finland to avoid new architectural errors and stupidities, of which there have already happened numerous ones to my chagrin and which bring shame to my term as director and are a disgrace to the government of the Emperor.
(Johan Albrecht Ehrenström in his letter to Carl Johan Walleen, a member of the Committee for Finnish Affairs on 16 October 1814.)

Before 1816 reconstruction had progressed slowly, because as Russia was at war with the First French Empire it could not grant Helsinki the resources the city needed - reconstruction was extremely expensive. In addition, Ehrenström felt that the death of commercial councillor Lindholm in 1816 was a significant setback for the construction, because Lindholm had taken part in the project with enthusiasm, and Ehrenström described him as active and unresting. In 1816 a new law saying the Senate of Finland and its offices had to move from Turku to Helsinki within two years started to hasten the construction. The grant for the reconstruction committee came straight from St. Petersburg, and Russia financed all military buildings in Helsinki, such as the Merikasarmi barracks and the Guard's Barracks. Russia's victory in the Napoleonic Wars and the new patriotic period that it had caused had a positive impact on the development of Helsinki, because the central government sought to emphasise the prominent construction in the new part of the realm it had just acquired.

Engel was appointed as the architect for the reconstruction committee on 27 March 1816. He described the construction in Helsinki in a letter sent to his parents in Berlin:

Helsinki is located on the coast of the sea, but the entire terrain is full of cliffs, and everywhere where new streets are supposed to be built, we have to explode mountains as tall as houses. Thus everywhere where the city will spread to, we hear constant booms and bangs from these explosions.
(Carl Ludvig Engel, 1 May 1816.)

In addition to designing the buildings, Engel directed the entirety of the construction, supervised the construction and prepared concrete work models. New members were also elected to the reconstruction committee: the last appointments were board member Johan Abraham Logren in 1816, grocer Petter Johan Leijsteen in 1817, commercial councillor Adolf Fredrik Gebauer in 1821 and merchant Fredrik Remander in 1825. The main activity of the committee ended in October 1825, but work left unfinished was finished by 1828. After this the construction was directed by the magistrate and the intendant office.

The construction plans were also influenced by Russian experts. The Russian army and its board of engineers influenced all construction for the army, and plans for the university involved experts from St. Petersburg. In addition, the emperor personally approved all architectural designs and funding solutions.

== Effects ==
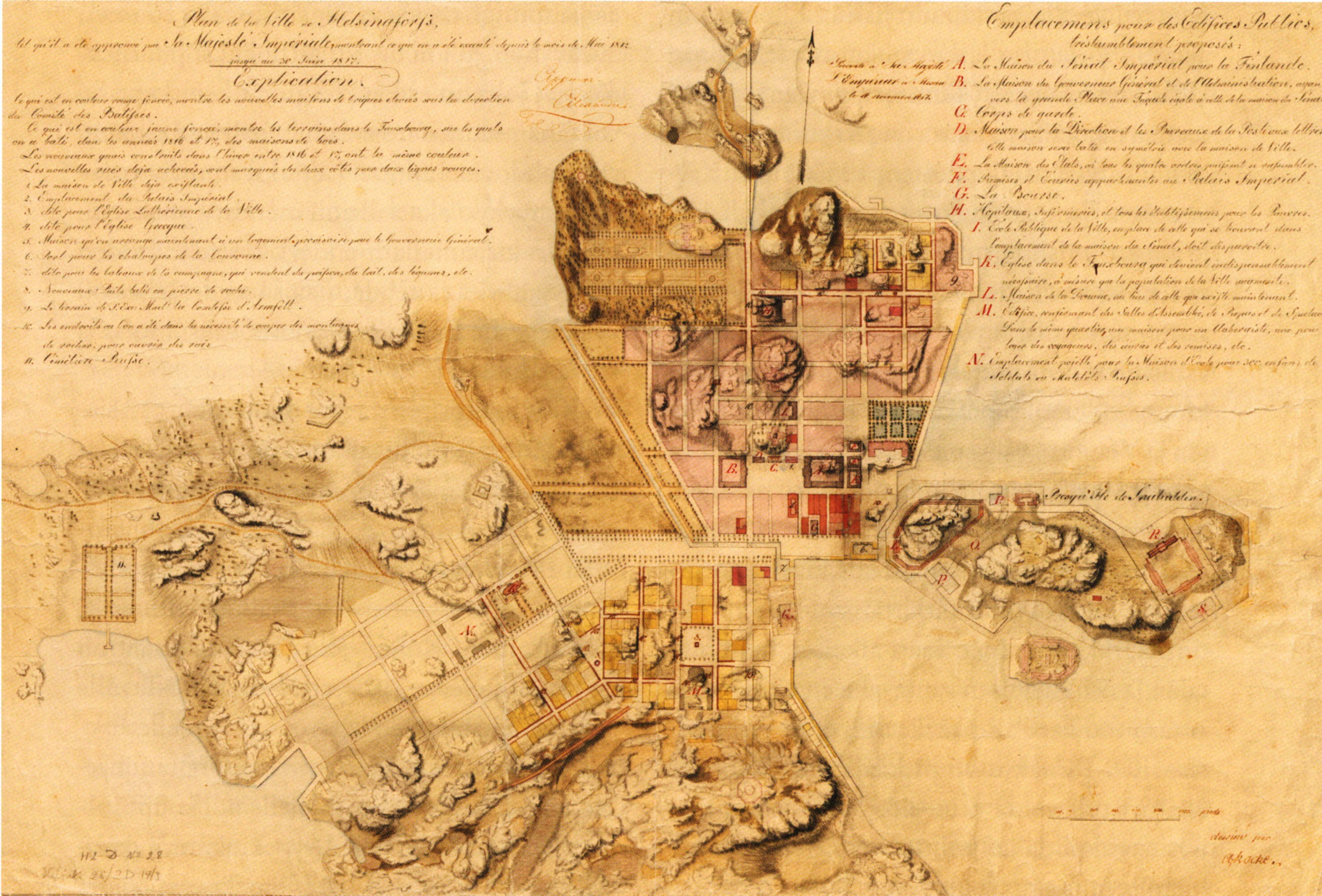
Ehrenström's final zoning plan (1817) which mainly resembled the original proposal from 1812. The picture shows the planned "Kluuvi canal" which was removed from the plan by 1818.

Under Swedish rule Helsinki had been a small town mostly inhabited by the bourgeoisie, but thanks to Russia, it became the governmental and cultural centre of Finland. As the new capital, it got the officials needed by the government of the grand duchy, such as the staff of the senate. By order from emperor Alexander I, the Senate of Finland and the central offices had to move from Turku to Helsinki by October 1819. The Governor-General of Finland also moved to the new capital. The military significance of the city did not lessen, the military still held a strong presence in Helsinki.

After the 1827 Great Fire of Turku emperor Nicholas I decided to move the Royal Academy of Turku, in other words the university, to Helsinki. Officials, academic university people, Russian soldiers and workers needed by the industry also started to move to Helsinki. The social life in Helsinki developed through various societies.

=== Architecture and city image ===
Before it had become the new capital, Helsinki had been mostly built of wood and its streets were largely unpaved. Ehrenström's zoning plan was mostly based on monumental solutions fit for a capital with large squares, government buildings and wide streets. The streets also became straighter and more level, and special attention was paid to their condition and lighting. The entire spatial experience of the current centre of Helsinki is mostly based on Ehrenström's visions.

The Empire style has been established as the style name for the 19th-century construction era in Helsinki. The Empire style buildings Carl Ludvig Engel designed are reminiscent of St. Petersburg, where had worked before Helsinki. The Empire style in St. Petersburg is mostly based from the style in France during Napoleon's reign, when the Russian empire had sought to westernise itself and hired many foreign architects. However, the Empire style in Russia formed its own variations, and the style has been explicitly called St. Petersburg Empire. For example, the new buildings in Helsinki had classic-style columns that had already been part of the city scene in St. Petersburg. Helsinki was playfully called "Little St. Petersburg" in the 1830s.

Alexander I's influence was apparent in the names in Helsinki, including renaming the street Suurkatu as Aleksanterinkatu and in the current University of Helsinki which was originally named as the Alexander University. There were also plans to name the Suomenlinna fortress as "Alexandria": the name would have been reminiscent of the ancient Alexandria founded by Alexander the Great in the 300s BC, as a kind of government centre grown from scratch. The street Mikonkatu was named after Alexander I's brother, the grand duke Michael Pavlovich.

Count Armfelt admired Helsinki's rise from a city destroyed by a fire to the new capital in a 1813 letter to Ehrenström:

I will never forget what amazing things I have seen in your work and projects in Helsinki, this perfect metamorphosis which has been accomplished so quickly and in such a way that almost nothing remains to be seen from the city's original state. It is with great chagrin that I think our offspring will not know anything about this, and what they will be told will seem like a fairytale to them.
(Gustaf Mauritz Armfelt, 1813)

Only a few buildings from the Swedish rule era remained in Helsinki in Suomenlinna and on the Vironniemi peninsula. Ehrenström's zoning plan meant that the original Swedish-era town hall and the Ulrika Eleonora Church on the Senate Square were demolished, and a new church called the Helsinki Cathedral was built on the north edge of the square. It towered way above the other buildings and was visible from almost everywhere in the constructed centre in the 19th century. The cathedral was planned to be symmetrically paired with an Orthodox cathedral on the Unioninkatu street, but this was ultimately left unbuilt. The Orthodox Uspenski Cathedral was only built onto the Katajanokka peninsula in the 1860s.

With Ehrenström's and Engel's design the city construction in Helsinki became common and the street structure became consistent. The grid plan of the city gradually grew from Kruununhaka to Kaartinkaupunki and the eastern parts of Kamppi. The wooden buildings were also managed to be kept mostly consistent and true to the classic style. New public parts were founded to encircle the city. In autumn 1818 Helsinki started getting street lights, when the senate's move to the new capital encouraged the city to spend funds on lighting. The lighting was seen as a symbol but also as a prerequisite for the city's urban life. 80 lights were installed, operating on hemp oil.

The most part of Ehrenström's and Engel's plan was realised, and during the next two decades, only small changes and additions were made to the zoning plan. The city population increased, and when Engel died in 1840 there were already 13300 inhabitants in Helsinki, which was more than Turku. Helsinki's status as the new capital had been unquestionably established.

The new capital was not left entirely without unrealised plans. The plans had become stricter and caution had increased because emperor Alexander I's government turned towards a stricter autocracy from 1819 to 1820. For example, the imperial palace with its parks on the Meritullintori square was left unbuilt. There were also plans to dredge the Kluuvinlahti bay forming it into a so-called Kluuvi canal. For financial reason the canal was left out of the plan in the late 1810s and in the end the bay was completely filled.

The Empire style in Helsinki ended when industrialisation started in the 1860s. Industrialisation was visible in train traffic, when the first rail line in Finland from Helsinki to Hämeenlinna was opened in 1862. Brick buildings, gas works and warehouses were built among the Empire-style and wooden buildings. The new capital started slowly resembling a continental metropolis.

== See also ==
- History of Helsinki
