= Engels Teater =

Entertainment venue in Finland

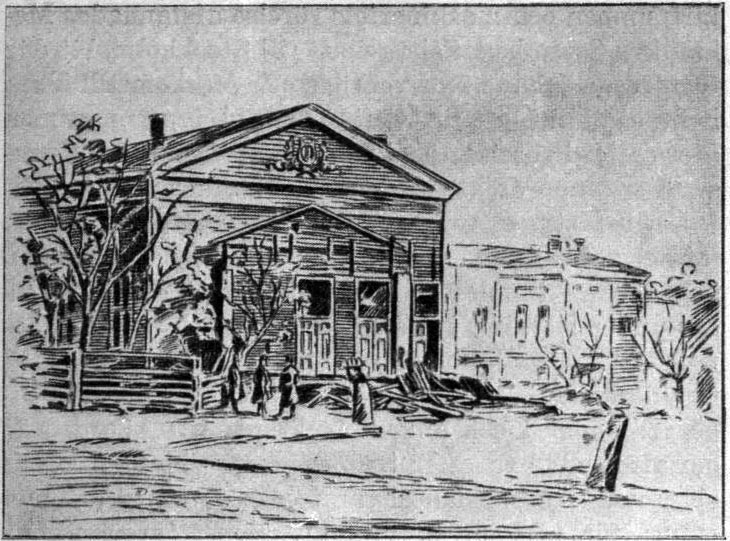
Engels teater

Engels teater ('Engel Theatre') was a historic theatre in Helsinki (Helsingfors) in Finland, active between 1827 and 1860. It was the second theater in Finland after Bonuviers Teater in Turku (Åbo), and the first theatre in Helsinki. It was located on Esplanaden at the intersection with Mikaelsgatan and was the predecessor of the Swedish Theatre.

The theatre was built to house the travelling theatre companies performing in Helsinki, being either Swedish language companies touring Finland, or German language companies on their way to Saint Petersburg. The building was a small wooden house designed by Carl Ludvig Engel in the corner of the Esplanaden.

The theatre building was used by travelling theater companies. On 8 February 1833, the theatre company of Carl Wilhelm Westerlund performed the play Finska flickan eller Hittebarnet på kyrkogården, in which Maria Silfvan sang a few lines in Finnish, likely the first time the Finnish language had been performed on a Finnish stage, decades prior to Charlotte Raa-Winterhjelm in Aleksis Kivi's Lea in 1869.

One of the most notable of the theatre companies using the building where arguably that of Edvard Stjernström, which enjoyed theatre monopoly in Southern Finland in 1850-53 and single use of the theater houses in Turku and Helsinki during those years, and being in effect the first permanent theatre staff in Finland, referred to as the "Finnish Company".

The building was eventually deemed to be too small, and was replaced by the Swedish Theatre.
