= Egges Teater =

Coordinates: 58.59319056°N 16.18758995°E

Egges Teater ('Egge's Theatre') was a historic theatre in Norrköping in Sweden, active between 1762 and 1798. It was the first theatre in Sweden outside the capital of Stockholm. In the 18th-century, Norrköping was the third city in Sweden, and there was a need for more entertainment in the prosperous city. The theatre was founded by the merchant Johan Ulric Egge (1730–1795), who owned a popular restaurant, and named Egge's after him. The theatre was situated in the centre of the city, between the Hedvig Church and the bridge across the Motala ström, and near the restaurant, the pleasure gardens and reading parlour own by Egge. The theatre house was relatively simple, a rectangle of wood, 18 metres long.

As all theatres in Sweden at the time, with the exception of Stockholm and Gothenburg, it was used by travelling theater companies. Other entertainments where also offered, such as public concerts, vax cabinets, acrobatics, circus performances and bear baiting; liquor was also served.

The theater was inaugurated in 1762 by the theater company of Carl Seuerling, who regularly visited the city for thirty years. On 5 August 1776, Romeo and Juliet by Shakespeare was performed on a Swedish stage for the first time by the Seuerling Company, with Margareta Seuerling as Juliet.

In 1795, during a performance by the theater company of Johan Peter Lewenhagen, La Marseillaise was performed onstage, which lead to a scandal, actions for the de facto regent Gustaf Adolf Reuterholm and for the theatre to be closed. It was replaced by the Saltängsteatern ('Salt Medow Theatre'), which became the new stage for visiting theater companies in Norrköping (1798-1850).
