= Åbo Svenska Teater =

Finland-Swedish theatre in Turku, Finland

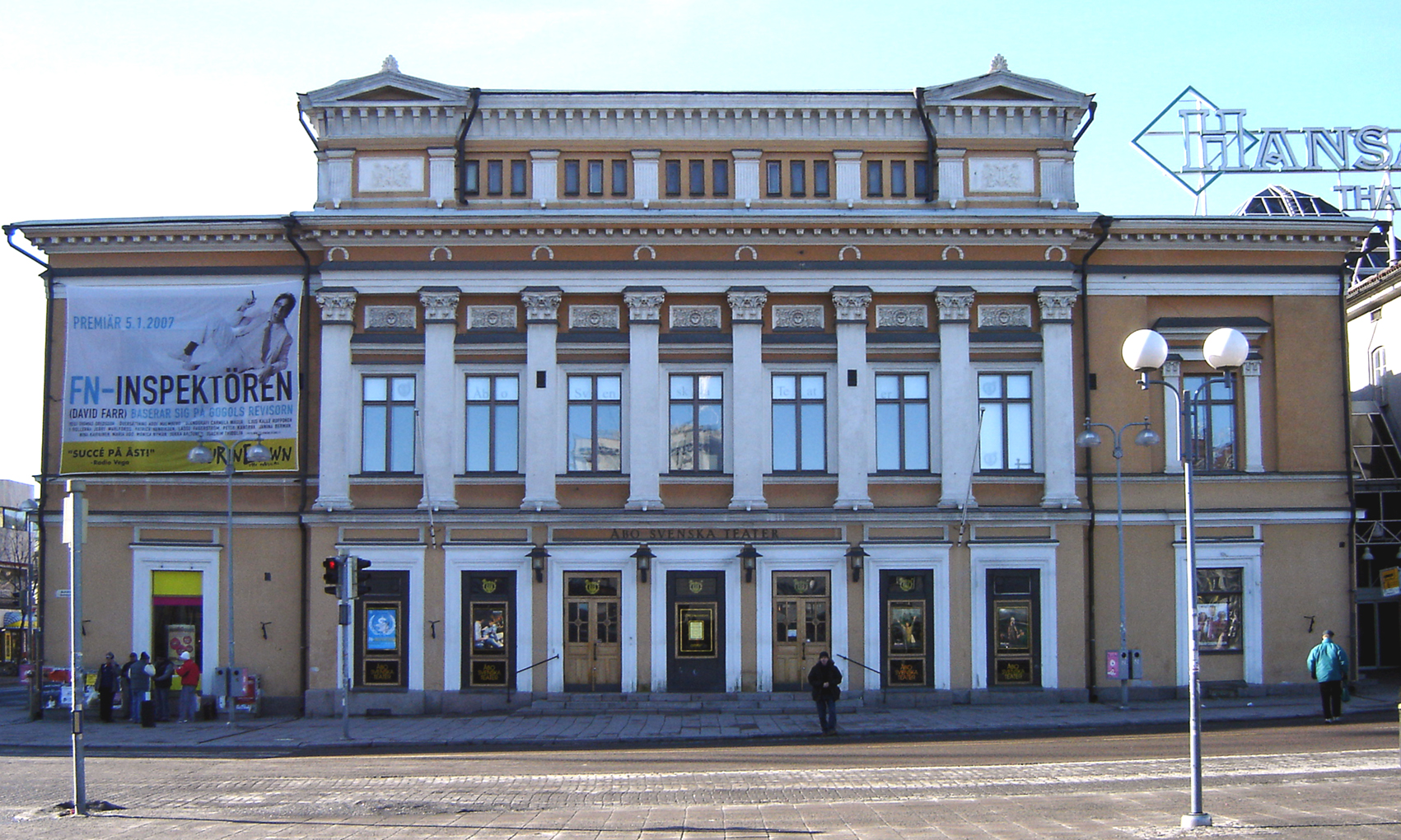
- Interactive map of Åbo Svenska Teater
- Address: Eerikinkatu 13, 20100; Turku; Finland
- Coordinates: 60°27′02″N 22°15′58″E
- Owner: Stiftelsen för Åbo Akademi
- Capacity: 365 Main Stage (2 levels), 136 Studio

Construction
- Opened: 1839

Website
- www.abosvenskateater.fi

Åbo Svenska Teater (Finnish: Turun ruotsalainen teatteri) is a Finland-Swedish theatre in the city of Turku in Finland and the oldest theatre in the country, founded in 1839. The building itself is also the oldest still functioning theatre house in Finland. The name means "The Swedish theatre of Åbo"; Åbo is the Swedish name of Turku.

== History ==
Turku was the capital city of Finland during Finland's epoch as a part of Sweden, and Swedish theatre companies visited Finland during the 18th century, the first of whom was the Stenborg Troupe in 1761 and the company of Carl Seuerling in the 1780s. There where however, no proper theatre building until the Bonuviers Teater was erected in the 1810s. When the old theatre was destroyed during the Great Fire of Turku in 1827, there was a need of a new theater house.

=== 1839-1894 ===
The theatre has been located in its present building since 1839, when it was opened by a local amateur society with the play Gubben i Bergsbygden the 21 January 1839. Later that same year, the theatre house was used by its first professional theatre company, that of Ulrik Torsslow, and its first professional concert singer, Betty Boije. In 1843, concerts by Johanna von Schoultz and Jenny Lind where both performed on its stage.

Prior to 1894, the theatre did not have a permanent staff, as Finland did not have any native actors at this point, and during the 19th century the theatre house was used by travelling theatre companies from Sweden. The most notable of these were the company of Pierre Deland, which visited the theatre regularly from 1840 to 1861, as well as the so called "Finnish Company" of Edvard Stjernström, which enjoyed theatre monopoly in Southern Finland in 1850-53. In the 1870s and 1880s, the famed Swedish company of Thérèse Elfforss frequnelty visited the theatre.

The first native theatre company performed in the theatre was the company of August Westermark in 1872, though it was not to be until 1894, that the first performance was given by a permanent native ensemble at the theatre.

== Activity ==
The theatre building is owned by Stiftelsen för Åbo Akademi and it is run by Åbo Svenska Teaterförening.

The theatre has three formal stages; Stora Scenen, with 365 seats, Studioscenen with 136 seats, and Tiljan-scenen, with a maximum of one hundred seats, as well as local activity.

== External links and sources ==
- Nordensvan, Georg, Svensk teater och svenska skådespelare från Gustav III till våra dagar. Förra delen, 1772-1842, Bonnier, Stockholm, 1917
- Nordisk familjebok / Uggleupplagan. 8. Feiss - Fruktmögel
