= Carl Westerlund =

Carl Westerlund may refer to:

- Carl Agardh Westerlund (1831–1908), Swedish malacologist
- Carl Wilhelm Westerlund (1809–1879), Finnish stage actor and theatre director
- Carl Julius Alvin Westerlund (1885–1952), Norwegian politician
