= Merikasarmi =

Barracks area in Helsinki, Finland

Coordinates: 60.168°N 24.972°E

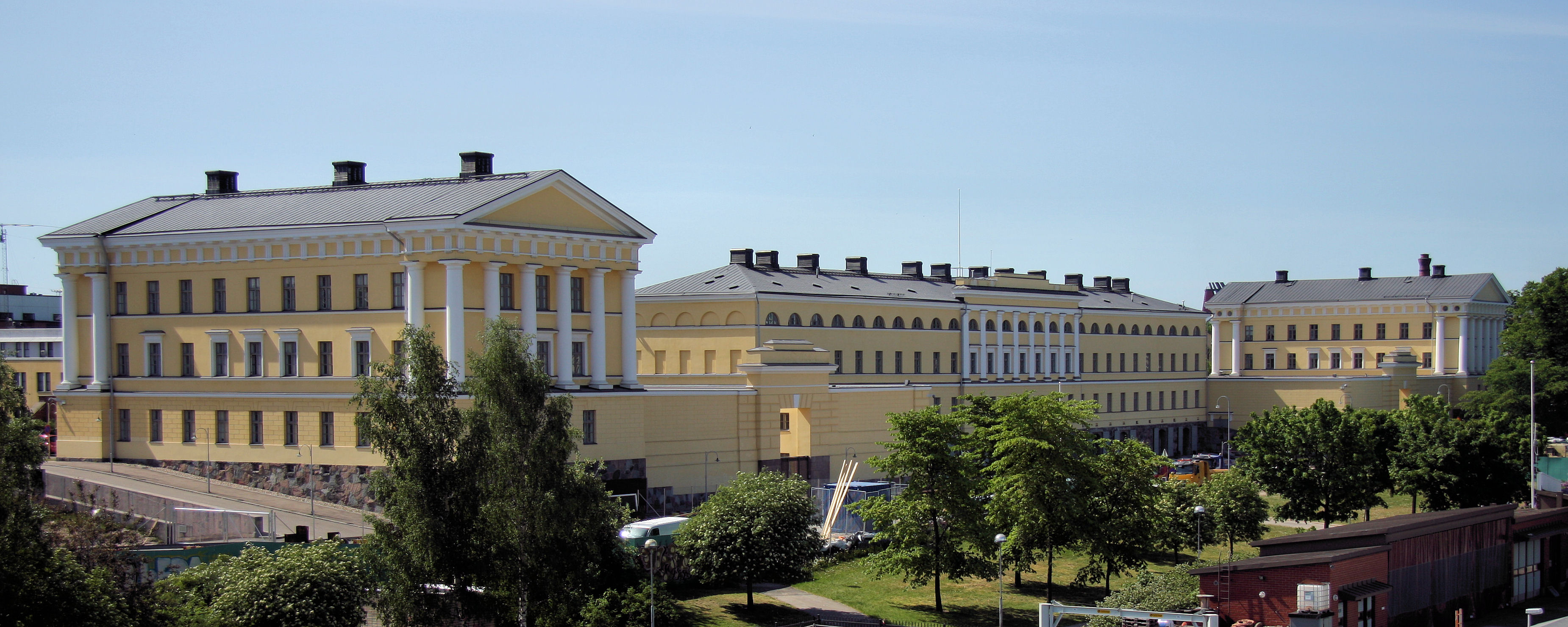
The northern facade of Merikasarmi, facing the sea shore.

Merikasarmi (originally known as Katajanokan kasarmi) is a barracks building in Katajanokka, Helsinki, Finland, originally built for the military of the Russian Empire from 1816 to 1820, which currently houses the premises of the Ministry for Foreign Affairs in Finland. The barracks was designed by Carl Ludvig Engel. Before the Foreign Ministry moved to the area in the late 1980s, the buildings were renovated and partly rebuilt according to the plans of Professor of Architecture Erik Kråkström.

To the north of the Merikasarmi building, the icebreakers of the Finnish state are anchored to the Katajanokka quay.

== History ==
=== Project of the Russian Empire ===
The Merikasarmi building is located on the northern shore of Katajanokka near the edge of the Katajanokka peninsula. There was an artillery battery situated in Katajanokka at the site of the current Katajanokka Casino already in 1721 during the Treaty of Nystad. There was artillery in Helsinki especially in Sveaborg. In 1812 the artillery area was decided to be used as the base of a barracks. The main zoning plan for the city of Helsinki was made by Johan Albrecht Ehrenström.

The building was financed by the Empire of Russia by order of Alexander I of Russia in 1816. Carl Ludvig Engel arrived in 1816 to plan the building, and after three months it was ready to be shown to Nicholas I of Russia. In 1826 two additional wings were ordered: a kitchen wing and a dormitory wing for officers. These wings were mostly finished by 1838. The wing on the western edge of the barracks was completed in 1825, but the eastern wing designed by Engel was not built at this point. There were Orthodox worships held during the early years of the Katajanokka barracks. The first soldiers to move to the barracks represented the ground forces of the military of the Empire of Russia.

=== From Katajanokka barracks to marine barracks ===
In 1832 the barracks was transferred to the use of the navy of the Military of the Grand Duchy of Finland, founded two years earlier. Because of this, the Katajanokka barracks was now called "Merikasarmi" (literally "marine barracks"). The navy of the military of the Grand Duchy of Finland was disbanded in 1880, when the army of the military was changed from a professional army to a drafted army. This caused the barracks to return to Russian use, and the area became a strong base for the Baltic Fleet. The Governors-General of the Grand Duchy of Finland thought the atmosphere of the Katajanokka barracks was unhealthy for Russian soldiers.

=== After Finnish independence ===
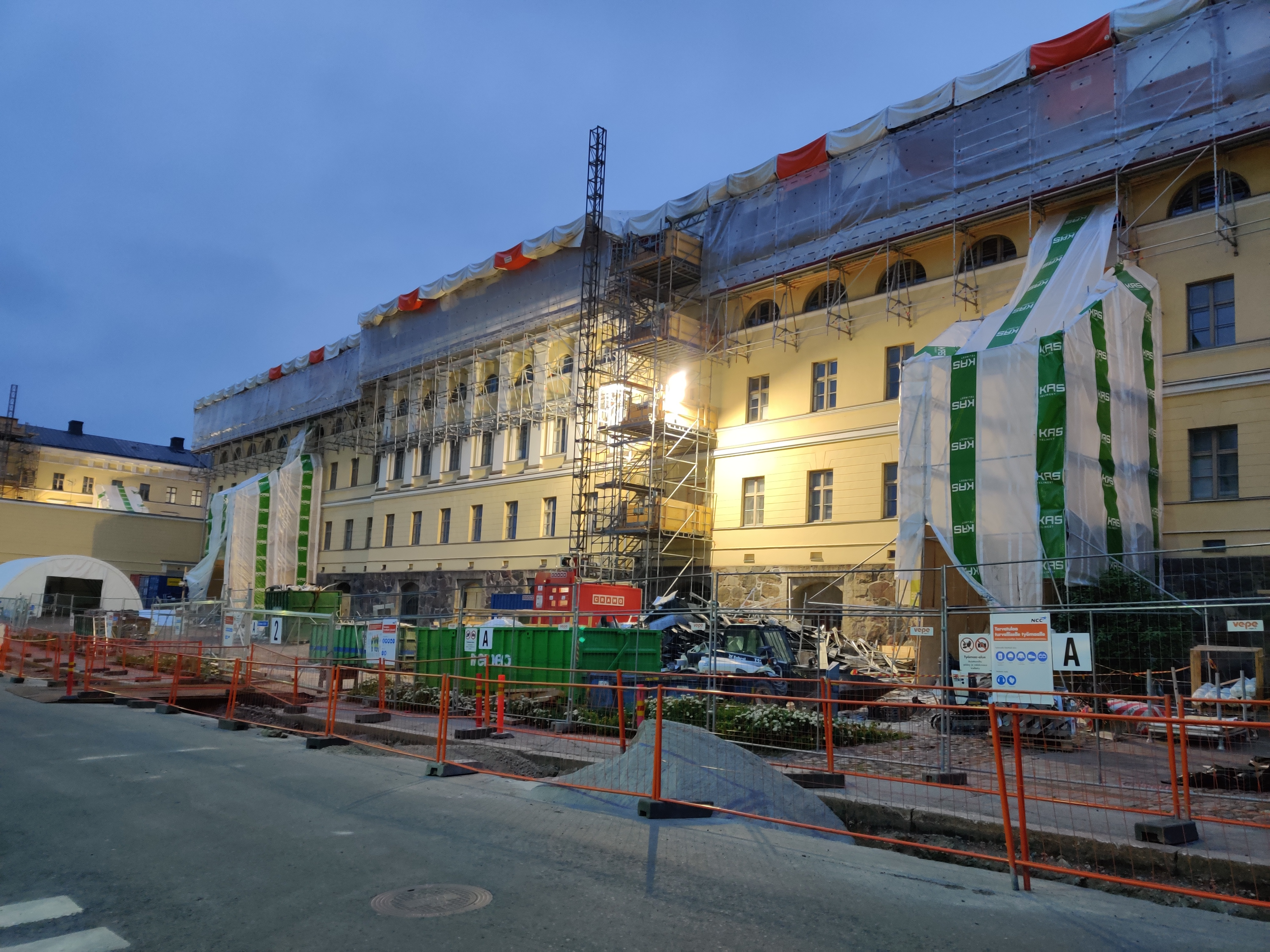
The main facade of Merikasarmi under renovation in June 2019.

After Finland became independent, the Merikasarmi building was transferred use for the Finnish Navy. The command of the navy was present in the area until 1958. The building was in use for the Guard Jaeger Regiment until 1968, when the regiment moved to Santahamina and Taivallahti.

In 1972 the Finnish Government decided to take the building into use for the Ministry for Foreign Affairs, but this only happened in the late 1980s. The last military institutions present in the area were the electrical and messaging departments of the Defence Command from 1980 to 1985. Valmet, founded after World War II, had its docks in the area and moved from Merikasarmi to Vuosaari in 1975.

A large area at the eastern tip of the Katajanokka peninsula was in use for the navy and later Valmet. There were a group of brick and wooden maintenance and storage buildings around the barracks proper. After the dock had moved away from the area, a residential area was built to the south and east of the barracks, known as the "new side" of Katajanokka. A number of the old brick buildings to the west of the barracks was preserved, one of them houses the Katajanokka elementary school.

The Ministry for Foreign Affairs moved to Merikasarmi from 22 different premises all around Helsinki between January 1986 and September 1989.

The inner courtyard between the C and G buildings of Merikasarmi was named Martti Ahtisaaren aukio ("Martti Ahtisaari Square") after President of Finland Martti Ahtisaari in 2009. The original purpose of the square had been to serve as an exercise field and ceremony courtyard for the Russian military.

The largest renovation in the history of the building started in November 2018. The purpose of the renovation is to make the premises more modern and more suitable for office use, and the entire building services engineering is under reconstruction. After the renovation the building will have space for over 800 employees in contrast to 400 as before. The renovation has been commissioned by Senate Properties and is being carried out by NCC. The approximate cost of the renovation is 88 million euro.

=== Users of the barracks ===
- Military of the Empire of Russia stationed in Helsinki from 1820 to 1832
- Navy of the Military of the Grand Duchy of Finland from 1832 to 1880
- The Baltic Fleet from 1880 to 1917
- Navy of Finland from 1918 to 1959
- The Guard Jaeger Regiment from 1958 to 1968
- The electrical and messaging departments of the Finnish Defence Command from 1 June 1980 to 30 April 1985
- The Ministry of Foreign Affairs in Finland starting from 1986-1989

== Buildings ==
Merikasarmi is an architecturally significant complex of several buildings, named A, B, C, D, E, F, G, and H. Some of the buildings are original buildings from the 19th century, some have been built later in accordance of the appearance of previously built buildings.

=== Building A ===
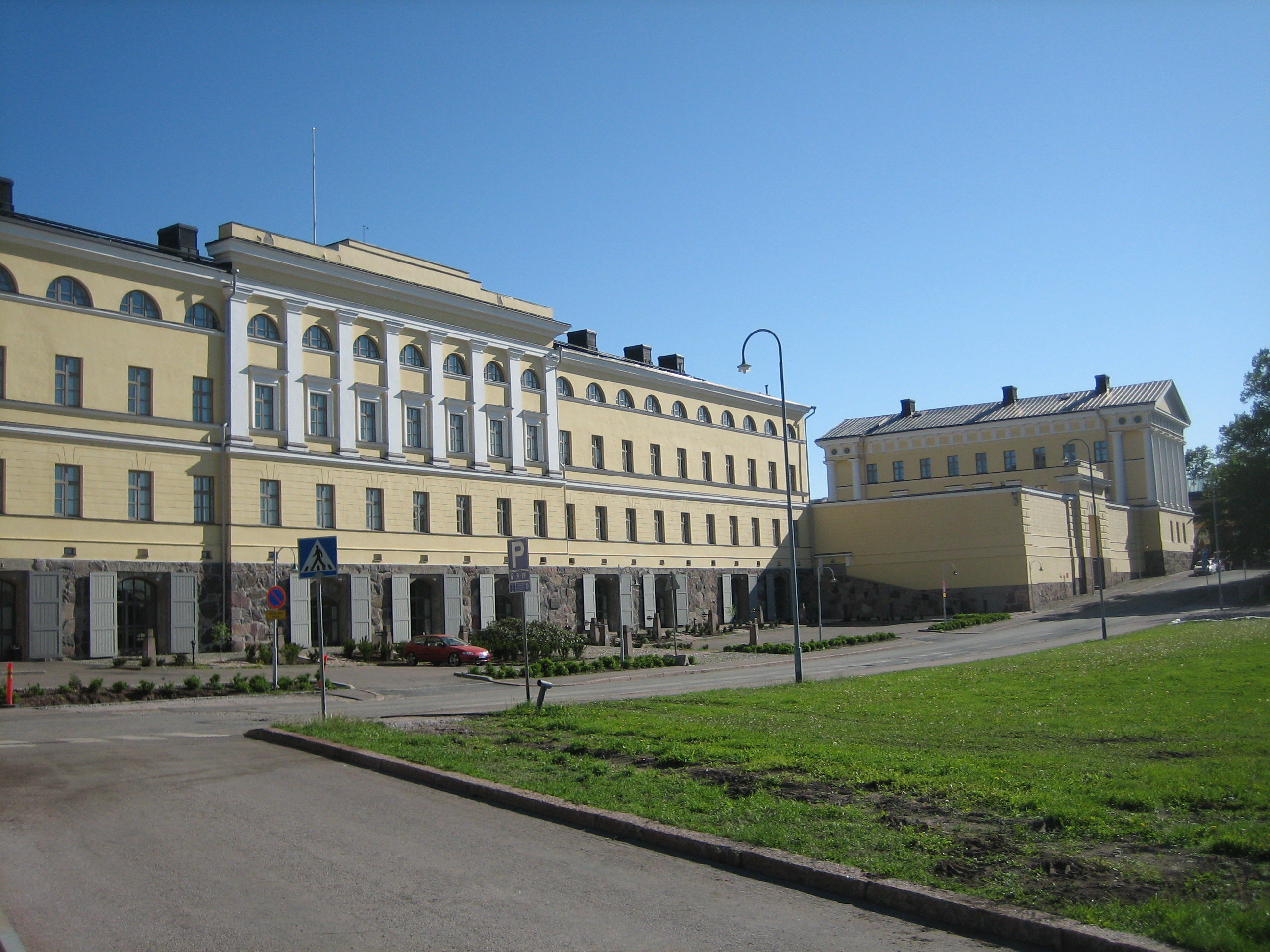

The main building of Merikasarmi, building A, was previously called Matruusirakennus. It was built in 1820.

The A building is located on the Laivastokatu street parallel to the Katajanokka quay. The mailing address for all buildings in the Ministry of Foreign Affairs is Laivastokatu 22.

==== Main corridor ====
There was formerly a company hall on the third floor, used for indoor foot drills for the military. The idea was to save the soldiers from the cruel marine weather during the drills. Governors-General Fabian Steinheil and Arseny Zakrevsky were worried about the health of the soldiers. Carl Ludvig Engel designed an efficient system of heating, so that according to him, even during a winter of -30 degrees Celsius the indoor temperature was "so terribly hot I thought I was dying".

=== Building B (eastern curtain wall rooms) ===
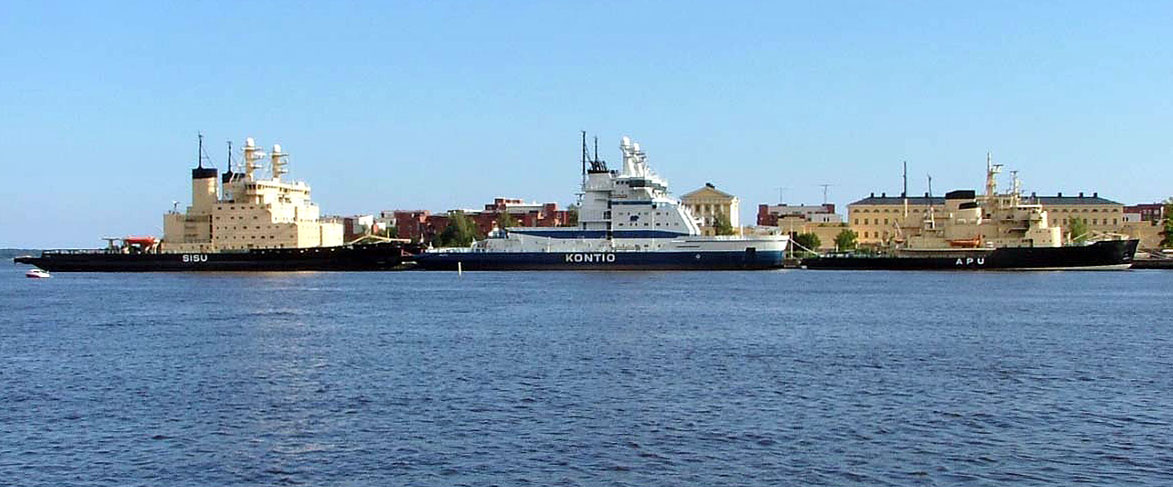
Icebreakers of the former shipping company Finstaship docked at Katajanokka in summer 2004: Sisu, Urho, Kontio, Otso, Apu and Voima. Apu was sold to Russia as a river icebreaker in 2006.

The B building was already part of Engel's original plan, but was left unbuilt at the time. When the area was renovated to its current shape in the 1980s the B building was built in accordance of Engel's original plan, similar to the H building, so it completes the symmetry of the north-facing facade of the A and B buildings.

=== Building E (hospital) ===
The hospital building of Merikasarmi was built in 1838. It is located along Merikasarmikatu.

=== Building H (western curtain wall rooms, officer building) ===
The building was built in 1825 for use for army officers. The building hosted the command of the Finnish Navy until 1958.

== Other information ==
=== Traffic connections ===
The Merikasarmi building can be reached by the Helsinki tram line 4 from the centre of Helsinki.

=== In art ===
- Valerian Galjamin: Näkymä Pohjoisrannasta Katajanokalle ("A view from Pohjoisranta to Katajanokka"), watercolour, 1827
- Part of the film Meidän poikamme merellä "(Our boys at the sea") was filmed at Merikasarmi. The film was the most popular film in Finland during the great depression of 1933.

== Bibliography ==
- M. Favorin and K. Ristolainen, The Naval Barracks = Merikasarmi, 1993, Ministry for Foreign Affairs, Helsinki
- E. Kråkström, Katajanokka Merikasarmi. Naval Barracks, Ministry of Foreign Affairs of Finland, unpublished
- Engel: Plan de la nouvelle Caserne pour Helsingfors (Plan for new barracks in Helsinki), online version (PDF)
