= Bonuviers Teater =

Bonuviers Teater ('Bonuvier Theatre') was a historic theatre in Åbo in Finland, active between 1813 and 1827. It was the first theater in Finland alongside the Engels Teater in Helsinki, and the first theatre in Åbo. It was the predecessor of the Åbo Svenska Theater.

Turku was the capital city of Finland during Finland's epoch as a part of Sweden, and Swedish theatre companies visited Finland during the 18th-century, the first of whom was the Stenborg Troupe in the 1761 and the company of Carl Seuerling in the 1780s. There where however, no proper theatre building.

It was founded by the actor and theater director Karl Gustav Bonuvier. The permit of the building was given in 1813, and the building was completed in 1817. It was used by travelling theater companies. Initially, Bonuvier's own company used the building between their tours in other parts of the country. In 1820, it was used by the company of Anders Peter Berggren, and in 1824–25 by Johan Gustaf Lemke (1790–1825).

The theatre was destroyed during the Great Fire of Turku of 1827.
