= Karl Gustav Bonuvier =

Swedish actor and theatre director (1776–1858)

- Born: 21 September 1776; Finland
- Died: 1 August 1858 (aged 81); Fredrikshamn, Finland
- Occupations: stage actor, director
- Known for: founder, Bonuviers Teater, first theatre house in Finland
- Spouse(s): Ulrica Sofia Björling (d.1809), Maria Christina Widbom
- Children: 4 daughters

Karl Gustav Bonuvier (21 September 1776 – 1 August 1858), was a Swedish stage actor and theatre director, active in Sweden and Finland. He is remembered for having founded the first theatre house in Finland.

== Life ==
Bonuvier was the son of Peter Bonnevier, a servant of the queen of Sweden, Louisa Ulrika of Prussia, and Anna Elisabet Klisnick. Karl Gustav Bonuvier married the actress Ulrica Sofia Björling (1778–1809) and after her death to the actress Maria Christina Widbom (1791–1825), and had four daughters.

=== Career ===
He was active at the Stenborg Theatre in Stockholm in 1796–99, where he played the lover in Den dubbla intrigen ('Double intrigue') by Dumaniant. When the Stenborg theater was closed in 1799, he was engaged in the travelling theater of his wife's brother-in-law Johan Peter Lewenhagen as well as in the Djurgårdsteatern. Finally, he formed his own travelling theater company, where he toured by the privilege of the Russian Czar in 1813–27.

In 1813, he was allowed to found a permanent theatre house in Turku, the Bonuviers Teater; the building was completed in 1817. This was the first theatre house in Finland, which made Bonuvier a pioneer. Previously, theatre in Finland had been conducted by travelling theatre troupes from Sweden, such as the Stenborg Troupe and the troupe of Martin Nürenbach and in 1795, the touring Seuerling theatre company became the first theater company permanently situated in Finland under the leadership of Margareta Seuerling. It was, however, Bonuvier who pioneered the first theater company in Finland staffing a permanent theater building rather than touring. His theater house was the predecessor of the Åbo Svenska Teater (1837).

The Bonuvier theater burned down in 1827, which also dissolved the theater company of Bonuvier. He was engaged as an actor in other theater companies, notably that of Carl Wilhelm Westerlund, and reportedly still active as an actor in other theater companies as late as 1838, but his last years are less known.

He died in the home of his daughter, who was married to an official in Fredrikshamn.

== See also ==
- Petter Stenborg
- Martin Nürenbach
