= Maria Silfvan =

Finnish actress (1802–1865)

- Born: Maria Elisabeth Silfvan; 25 March 1802; Turku, Finland
- Died: 10 September 1865 (aged 63); Oulu, Finland
- Other names: Maria Sylvan, Maria Lempke, Maria Westerlund
- Spouse(s): Evert Lempke, K.V. Westerlund

Maria Elisabeth Silfvan, as married Lempke and then Westerlund, in Swedish called Maria Sylvan, (25 March 1802 in Turku – 10 September 1865 in Oulu), was a Finnish actress, among the first professional native actors in Finland.

== Life ==
Maria Silfvan was born in Turku.

In Finland, there was no permanent theatres and no native actors in the beginning of the 19th century; theatre was played by travelling Swedish theatre troupes touring the country. Between 1813 and 1827, the first theatre was managed in Turku by the troupe of K.G. Bonnevier, who was given permission by the Russian emperor, to build a simple theatre house in the city. Maria Silfvan was employed by Bonuvier in an unknown time, and was reportedly discovered when selling tickets and candy to the visitors of the theatre. Silfvan was hired in this troupe, and was seen as a natural dramatic talent. The year of her debut is unknown. In 1825, she played the leading part in Friedrich Schiller's Mary Stuart (play) opposite Inga Åberg as Elizabeth Tudor.

In 1825, she married the actor Evert Lempke and with him employed at the troupes of Anders Petter Berggren and then Carl Wilhelm Westerlund. When she married Westerlund in 1827, Lempke reportedly agreed to a divorce only with the condition that he was given an employment in the troupe for life, a condition which he was granted. After touring in Sweden, she spent her career touring in most cities in Finland. She is described as a beauty with a warm and intelligent way of acting.

Among her parts were the title role of Johanna af Montfaucon by Kotzebue, Ophelia in "Hamlet", Emma von Falkenstein in "Korsfararne" (Crusaders) by Kotzebue and Siri Brahe in Siri Brahe och Johan Gyllenstierna by Gustav III of Sweden.

H. N. Pinello said about her:

"In the history of the spiritual nurture of Finland she will be remembered as a child of the people who, with courage, will and restless work dedicated herself to the art of the stage, so neglected in her country by her contemporaries".

== See also ==
- Hedvig Raa-Winterhjelm
- Sofia Liljegren
