= Charlotta Seuerling =

Swedish musician and writer

- Born: 1782 or 1784
- Died: 1828 (age c. 46 or 44); Sweden
- Occupations: Singer, harpsichordist, poet, actress, inventor, and also had a position at the institute for the blind in St. Petersburg
- Known for: Author of "Sång i en melankolisk stund", blind musician

Charlotta Antonia "Charlotte Antoinette" Seuerling (1782/1784 – 25 September 1828), was a blind Swedish concert singer, harpsichordist, composer and poet, known as "The Blind Song-Maiden". She was active in Sweden, Finland and Russia. Her last name is also spelled as Seijerling and Seyerling. Her first name was Charlotta Antoinetta (or Antonia), but in the French fashion of the time, she was often called Charlotte Antoinette. She was the author of the popular song "Sång i en melankolisk stund".

== Early life ==
Charlotta Seuerling was the daughter of Carl Gottfried Seuerling and Margareta Seuerling, actors and directors of a travelling theatre company. She became blind at the age of four due to an incompetent smallpox vaccination. Four years later, at the age of eight, she contracted smallpox, and the scars made people consider her ugly, which made her shy.

As a child, she contributed to the household by singing songs she had composed herself to harp music in her parents' theatre. She was widely advertised as a wonder: the singing and music-making blind child. She also played the guitar. Her father was very ambitious and upheld a high standard in the plays at his theatre company, often performing famous plays from the continent, such as plays by Shakespeare. Her mother was a good actress who became the first Swedish-speaking Juliet in Romeo and Juliet in Norrköping in 1776. They toured in both Sweden and Finland, and even performed at the Swedish court on at least one occasion. They were popular among the public, but often had financial difficulties and problems with irregular staff – during periods of staff shortage they were forced to use dolls on stage. Charlotta's sister Carolina Fredrika Seuerling was also an actress, but she married a vicar in 1789 and retired.

== Career ==
After the death of her father in 1795, her mother took sole charge of the theatre and moved to Finland, where there was less competition, to tour as the director of her troupe. She sent her daughter to Stockholm to have an eye operation by the famous doctors Rislachi and af Bjerkèn, that was promised to give her eyesight back. The operation, however, failed, and Seuerling did not have the money to join her mother in Finland. She was thereby forced to stay in a boardinghouse for poor women.

Her musical talent was discovered in 1806 by Pär Aron Borg, who gave piano lessons to the poor women of the boardinghouse piano playing. He was impressed by her ability and accepted her as his private student in musical theory in 1807, giving her a home with his family. Impressed by her ability to learn, he added more subjects, and soon, she excelled in the natural sciences and languages. She also composed her own poems, and created a device by which she could write her poems down. Borg invented a system of blind writing, by which she could learn to read notes, German and French.

She was uninterested in subjects traditionally given to her gender, and Borg published a pamphlet where he argued that women were capable of learning subjects from which they were banned. Borg also taught her medicine; also in this subject, she was so successful that he argued that women would be equally and even better as medical doctors than men.

Inspired by her ability to learn, in 1808 Borg founded the first institute for the blind and the deaf in Sweden, Manillaskolan. Seuerling was his first student, and she is sometimes regarded as the first blind student of her country. In 1808, Borg held a demonstration during which Seuerling displayed her ability and talent in reading and writing, playing the harp and clavichord, reading notes, speaking French and German, as well as weaving, sewing and knitting. During this time period in history, blind and deaf people were often thought to be unable to be educated, and the demonstration of Charlotta Seuerling was of great help to the institute. Her ability attracted attention, and much of the support of the newly founded institute is attributed to her.

On 5 July 1809, Borg held a public exam for his pupils in front of five hundred guests, among them the queen, Hedvig Elisabeth Charlotte of Holstein-Gottorp. Charlotta Seuerling performed her own song: "I, who do not enjoy the pleasure of seeing the treasured Queen". Upon this, the queen complimented her, and Charlotta, entirely in the taste of the time, dropped her harp and fainted with happiness. She found great success. The scene was described in a poem by Gustaf Snoilsky: Upon this the blind songmaiden was moved / and by her gratitute stagger..., which led to her being known as the "Songmaiden". After this, the queen became the protector of the institute, and it was also given government support.

Seuerling wrote the song "Sång i en melankolisk stund" (English: Song in a Moment of melancholy) for harp music. The song was very popular in Sweden during the entire 19th century. It teams depression, suicide and betrayal, but also of the happiness of friendship and the hope it gives, interpreted as her own feelings when she was given tuition by Pär Aron Borg and her life changed. It begins: No ray of light shine from above, the night was terrifying and darkness surrounded me..., and ends: "...then as the first ray of dawn a light broke through the mist and friendship came; and with its radiance calm and joy filled my heart."

In 1810, Seuerling joined her mother in Finland, which was now a part of Russia, and performed in her mother's theatre troupe. In 1811, her mother met with financial difficulties. They were then both put under the protection of the Russian empress dowager, Maria Feodorovna (Sophie Dorothea of Württemberg), who had heard of Seuerlings reputation as a harpist, and each received a pension of 600 rubles. Charlotta moved to Russia, where she assisted in the development of Valentin Haüys Institute for the Blind in Saint Petersburg, where she received a position.

== Death and legacy ==
Seuerling returned to Sweden in 1823, and died five years later. Seuerling's harp, letters, and poems written by her hand are kept at Stockholm Music Museum. Among her writings is also a writing test, which is the oldest example of blind text in Sweden, written with a writing device constructed for the blind before Braille, kept at the National Library of Sweden. Her song "Sång i en melankolisk stund" was published anonymously many times after 1828, and under her name in the song book Miniaturvisbok (1852) alongside works by Johan Olof Wallin, Fredrika Bremer and Gunnar Wennerberg.

== See also ==
- Maria Theresia von Paradis
- Pauline Åhman
