= Betty Boije =

Swedish–Finnish opera singer and composer

- Born: Betty Natalie Boije af Gennäs; 14 February 1822; Jakobstad, Grand Duchy of Finland, Russian Empire
- Died: 14 November 1854 (aged 32) Stockholm, Sweden
- Occupations: Opera singer; concert singer; composer
- Instrument: Voice
- Spouse: Isidor Dannström (m. 1853)

Betty Natalie Boije af Gennäs (14 February 1822 - 14 November 1854), was a Swedish–Finnish opera and concert singer (contralto) and composer.

== Biography ==
Boije was born on 14 February 1822 in Jakobstad, Grand Duchy of Finland to the Swedish nobleman Klas Otto Boije af Gennäs and Marianna Horn af Rantzien. Through her father Boije was a member of the Boije af Gennäs family. Boije was one of eight children and was the sister of the pianist Wilhelmina Boije. Boije was raised in Finland, were her father had a position at the customs office of Pori.

Betty Boije debuted as a concert singer in Turku in 1847. From 1847 to 1848, Boije was a student of the Swedish composer Isidor Dannström. She made a successful tour as a concert singer in Turku, Helsinki, Reval and Saint Petersburg. In 1849, she made her debut in Stockholm in Sweden. She was active as an opera singer at the Royal Swedish Opera in Stockholm in 1850-1851. She was described as an excellent alto and was given particular praise as Nancy in Martha, in which she made such a success that she was made to act in it again and again. She herself chose to leave the stage and return her profession as a concert singer. She performed in Finland, Denmark and Norway.

In 1853-54, she toured as a concert singer with her spouse and her sister in Great Britain and the United States. She made a success in London, where she performed with Louise Michaeli with her sister. In the United States, she performed in Washington and New York. After her performance in New York, however, she became ill, and they decided to discontinue the tour and return to Sweden. She died not long after their return.

She was also a composer.

Betty Boije was the first noblewoman to be professionally active as a stage performer in Finland and Sweden. The profession was not regarded to be suitable for a member of the aristocracy in this time period. Although Betty Boije's father was indeed a nobleman, he was not rich, and her sister also supported herself as an artist (in her case a pianist). Betty Boije's widower Isidor Dannström, in his late biography over her, claimed she had never acted on stage and merely performed as a concert singer.

== Personal life ==
In 1853, Boije married Isidor Dannström.
