= Margareta Seuerling =

Swedish actress and theatre director

- Born: Margareta Lindahl; 1747; Stockholm, Sweden
- Died: 1820 (age ca 73); Helsinki, Grand Duchy of Finland, Russian Empire
- Spouse: Carl Gottfried Seuerling

Margaret(h)a Seuerling née Lindahl (1747–1820) was a Swedish actress and theatre director in a travelling theatre company, perhaps the most known travelling actress of her time in Scandinavia, active in both Sweden and Finland. She was one of the first, perhaps the very first, to introduce secular theatre in Finland: her family and its company represents a large part of the theatre history in Sweden and Finland.

== Life ==
=== Early life ===
Born as the daughter of the actor Peter Lindahl and the actress Margareta Maria Fabritz. Her parents belonged to the first generation of Swedish actors at the theatre of Bollhuset and was both members of the board of directors of the theatre, she herself became the second generation of Swedish-speaking actors. Before this time, only foreign actors had performed in Sweden, but between 1737 and 1753, the first Swedish actors were allowed to perform in the theatre of Stockholm.

In 1753, the Swedish actors were fired by queen Louisa Ulrika of Prussia, who replaced them with a French theatre company. The Swedish company split in two; one, the Stenborg Troupe under Petter Stenborg, who performed on smaller stages in Stockholm, and the second under Johan Bergholtz (who died 1774) and her father, Peter Lindahl, who was given royal permission to play in the countryside, touring the countryside as a travelling theatre-company; it was the biggest travelling theatre company in Sweden, and from 1760, he dominated the stages of the city of Gothenburg, whose first real theatre, Comediehuset, was not built until 1779. Among his actors were many actors earlier active at the theatre of Bollhuset, such as Johanna Catharina Enbeck, "madame Gentschein" and Petter Öberg, both later members of Petter Stenborgs company, and Catharina Sophia Murman, the wife of Johan Bergholt'z, who left the troupe with her husband in 1755, when Lindahl's partnership with the more adventurous Bergholtz, who was arrested for seduction, was broken.

Margareta performed in her parents' troupe as a child in the 1750s, it is not known exactly from when, but in 1795, she herself stated that she had been on the stage for forty years, which would mean that she had performed since 1755; since the age of eight.

=== Adult career ===
In 1768, her father's troupe was taken over by her husband, the German actor Carl Gottfried Seuerling, whom she married the same year; his little German troop had united with her father's in about 1760.

After this, they performed a lot in Stockholm, and also in Finland, especially between 1780 and 1790, where they were among the first theatre-troupes to perform. Her husband was very ambitious and upheld a high standard in the plays, often performing famous plays from the continent, such as plays by Molière, Holberg and Shakespeare, and she became the first Swedish-speaking Juliet in "Romeo and Juliet" on Egges Teater in Norrköping on 5 August 1776, and they also performed the first play by Calderon in the Swedish language in 1784.

They toured in both Sweden and Finland, and even performed at the Swedish court on at least one occasion, and were popular among the public, but often had financial difficulties and problems with irregular staff - during periods of staff-shortage they were forced to use dolls on stage. One of the many temporary members of their staff was Martin Nürenbach, who performed with them during the 1767–1768 season and then went to Norway, where he started the first (though short-lived) theatre in Oslo in 1771–1772.

=== Sole director ===
In 1792, her husband retired to his property outside Örebro, where the parents of Margareta also settled, and the troupe was taken over by actor Johan Peter Lewenhagen; however, Lewenhagen was threatened with the confiscating of his licence when he played the La Marseillaise for the audience in the pauses, and when Carl Seuerling died in 1795, Margareta Seuerling took over the troupe as their director. She left Sweden and toured around in Finland, where they were no theatre and where she spent the rest of her career. She could be regarded as the founder of the first Finnish theatre tradition; Swedish troupes had performed in Finland before, such as the Stenborg troupe in the 1760s, and her husband's troupe in the 1780s, but this had been temporary; her troupe was, though a travelling troupe, stationed in Finland. Her troupe performed in Turku (Åbo) during 1803.

Seuerling had seven children. She was the mother of Carl Fredrik Seuerling (d. 1831), the actor Gustaf Wilhelm Seuerling, the school teacher Gottfrid Ferdinand Seuerling (1775-1826), the actress Carolina Seuerling (1769-1821), the musician Charlotta Seuerling and the governess Gustafva Margaretha Seuerling (1786-1863). Her second youngest daughter, the blind singer and harpsichordist Charlotta Seuerling, whom she sent to Stockholm for education, became famous in the salons.

During the Finnish War between Sweden and Russia 1808–09, she performed at the frontiers, sometimes with Swedish consent, sometimes with Russian. When Finland was conquered by Russia in 1809, she stayed on.

Her daughter Charlotte returned in 1810, and helped her financially; when in financial trouble in 1811, they were both placed under the protection of the Empress Dowager of Russia.

Margareta Seuerling retired in 1813 and died in Helsinki (Helsingfors) seven years later.

== See also ==
- Elisabeth Lillström
- Karl Gustav Bonuvier
