= Johan Albrecht Ehrenström =

Finnish politician (1762–1847)

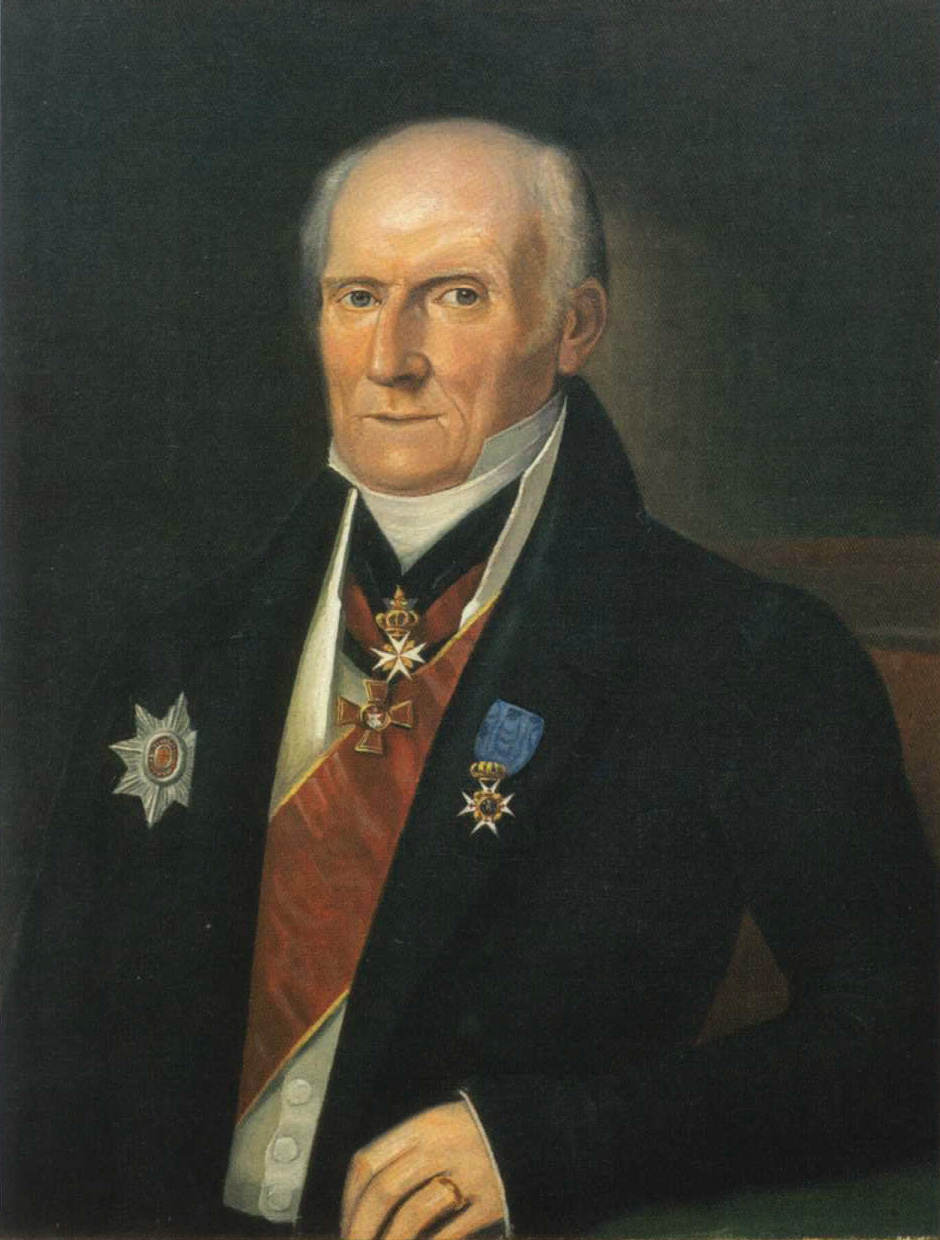
- Portrait by Johan Erik Lindh, 1839
- Born: 28 August 1762; Helsinki, Sweden (now Finland)
- Died: 15 April 1847 (aged 84); Helsinki, Grand Duchy of Finland, Russian Empire

Johan Albrecht Ehrenström (28 August 1762 – 15 April 1847) was a notable Finnish politician and official who is best remembered as the designer of Helsinki city plan.

== Biography ==
Ehrenström was a resident of what would later become Finland, in the eastern parts of the Swedish Kingdom. Following the Swedish defeat in the Finnish War in 1809, the region became a part of the Russian Empire, and the city of Helsinki was promoted to be the new capital of the new Grand Duchy of Finland. Ehrenström was selected to be the chairman of the committee in charge of rebuilding the city of Helsinki after a fire that destroyed many of its old wooden structures in 1808.

In contrast to the old medieval-style city plan with narrow and winding alleys, Ehrenström's vision for Helsinki was one of wide streets placed on a geometric grid in the fashion of the cities of ancient Greece. This plan was eventually approved by Tsar Alexander I of Russia, Grand Duke of Finland, and the city redesigned, led by German architect Carl Ludvig Engel. After the city of Oulu was devastated by fire in 1822, Ehrenström was tasked with drawing a new plan for it. This was finished in 1824 and ratified by the Tsar the following year.

== Gallery ==
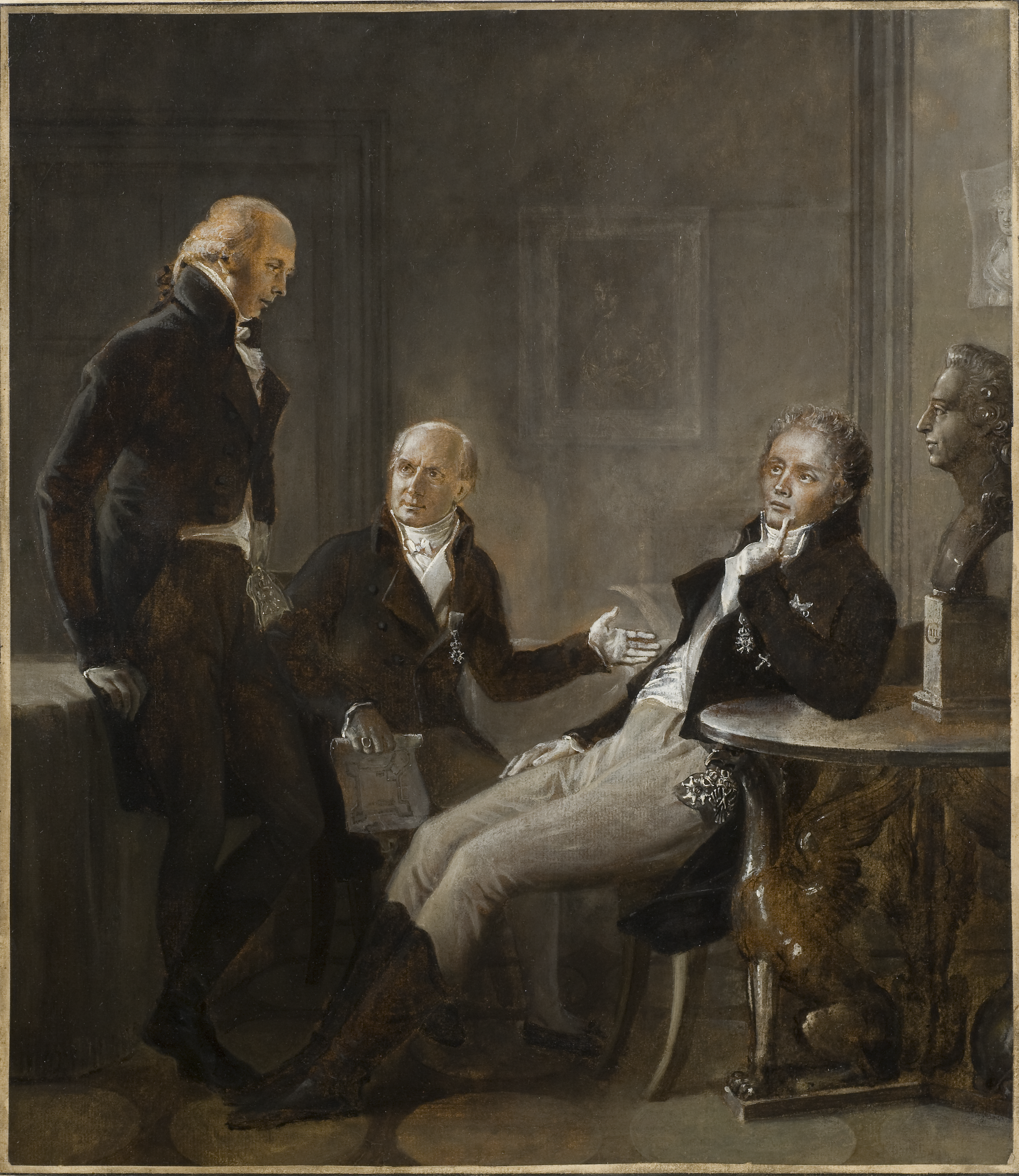
Johan Fredrik Aminoff, Johan Albrecht Ehrenström and Gustaf Mauritz Armfelt, painting by René Théodore Berthon, 1803

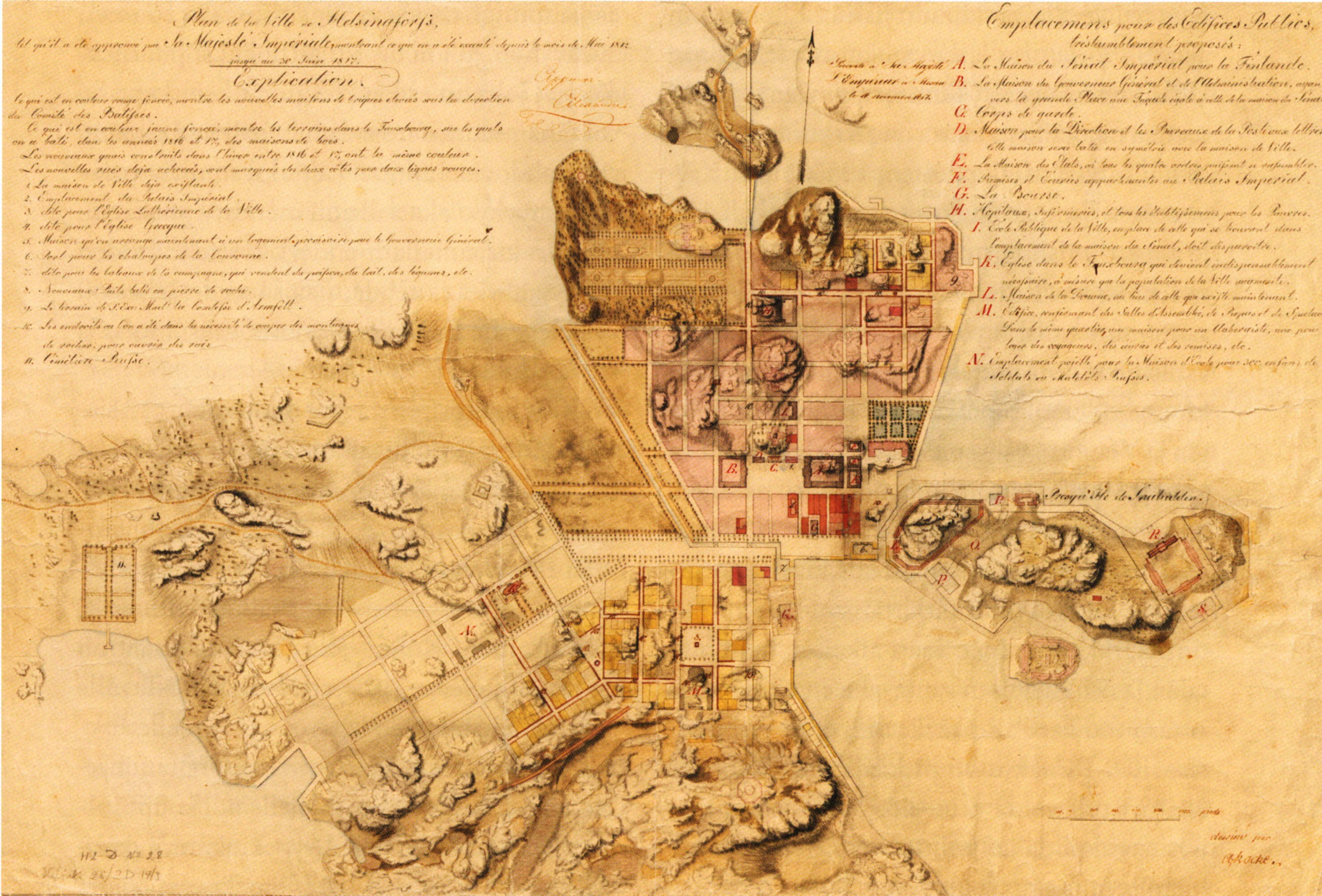
Ehrenstöm's final plan for the city, 30 June 1817

== Other Source ==
- Yrjö Reinhold Emanuel Blomstedt Johan Albrecht Ehrenström. Kustavilainen ja kaupunginrakentaja (Helsinki: 1963) Finnish
