= Carl Wilhelm Westerlund =

Finnish stage actor and theatre director

Carl Wilhelm Westerlund (1809-1879), was a Finnish stage actor and theatre director. He played in important role in Finnish theater history and managed his own (Swedish language) travelling theatre company in 1830-45, which was at the time the leading theater company in Finland, being the only theater company permanently staged in Finland, which was otherwise dominated by theater companies on temporary tours from Sweden. He was married to Maria Silfvan.
