= Carl Seuerling =

German-born Swedish stage actor and theater director

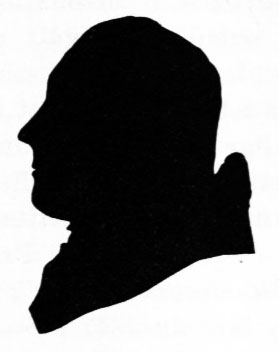
Carl Seuerling

Carl Gottfried Seuerling (1727–1795) was a German-born Swedish stage actor and theater director. He was the director of the Seuerling Theater Company, one of only two professional Swedish-language theater companies of the era, and is credited with introducing the works of William Shakespeare to the Swedish stage. His company also played a pioneering role in the history of theater in Finland, being among the first to bring dramatic classics to audiences across the country.

== Life ==
Carl Seuerling was originally from the Holy Roman Empire and arrived in Sweden as the leader of a travelling theater company in 1760. He married the Swedish actress Margareta Seuerling (1747–1820) in 1769 and took over the theater company of her father, Peter Lindahl (1712–1792).

The Seuerling travelling theater company performed all over Sweden and Finland, bringing theatrical performances to many places for the first time. Historically, they have not been described as a company of great quality – they often experienced a shortage of staff, inexperienced actors and performed in conditions which did not allow for high-quality scenery; the strong German accent of Carl Seuerling was caricatured, and anecdotes of failed performances circulated, particularly among the upper classes. However, these judgements are likely overreactions from an elite audience used to the theatres in the capital; in the provincial press, the company often received positive reviews, and they were popular among the public in the towns and countryside in which they toured, playing a pioneering role in Swedish theater history.

Seuerling introduced the works of William Shakespeare on the Swedish stage by staging the first performance of Romeo and Juliet at the Egges theater in Norrköping on 5 August 1776, with himself and his wife in the main parts.

In 1793 Carl Seuerling left the leadership of his theater company to Johan Peter Lewenhagen (1770–1832). He died in 1795, after which his wife Margareta Seuerling took over the company.

=== Activities in Finland ===
The company first visited Åbo in the winter of 1767–1768, after which they continued eastward via Helsinki, Borgå and Lovisa to Fredrikshamn, where they were refused permission to perform on 12 May. The company returned to Åbo in 1778, and from 1780 there are records of performances in both Helsinki and Uleåborg. The poet Frans Mikael Franzén, who later became one of Sweden's most celebrated writers, recorded having witnessed a performance of Romeo and Juliet in Uleåborg.

Through their tours, the Seuerling company brought the works of Shakespeare, Calderón, Molière, Racine, Holberg, Voltaire and Lessing to Finnish audiences for the first time. The company also introduced two practical innovations to Finnish theater: the stage was reserved exclusively for performers, and performances were advertised by printed posters. The first theater advertisement ever printed in Finland appeared in Åbo Tidningar on 8 October 1792.

Seuerling's legacy has been described as contradictory. On one hand, anecdotes portray him as a somewhat comic figure, and the primitive conditions of his performances often led to farcical situations. On the other hand, his work represented a genuine cultural contribution, as he was the first to make the classics of European drama accessible to the general public in Finland.

=== Margareta Seuerling's continued activities ===
After Carl Gottfried Seuerling's death in 1795, his widow Margareta Seuerling resumed leadership of the theater company and continued touring in Finland, organizing guest performances until 1813, when Carl Gustaf Bonuvier took over the company. As a female director she faced considerable difficulties with the authorities; in Turku she was imprisoned for debt in 1810–1811. She eventually settled in Helsinki, where she was supported by a pension granted by the Russian Dowager Empress.

== Family ==
Seuerling had six children. He was the father of Carl Fredrik Seuerling (d. 1831), the actor Gustaf Wilhelm Seuerling, the school teacher Gottfrid Ferdinand Seuerling (1775–1826), the actress Carolina Seuerling (1769–1821), the musician Charlotta Seuerling and the governess Gustafva Margaretha Seuerling (1786–1863).

== Other sources ==
- Schöldström, Birger (1889). Seuerling och hans "comædietroupp" : ett blad ur svenska landsortsteaterns historia. Stockholm. Libris 281714.
