= Almlöf =

Almlöf is a Swedish surname that may refer to:

- Betty Deland (later Almlöf 1831–1882), Swedish actress, wife of Knut
- Charlotta Almlöf (1813–1882), Swedish stage actress, wife of Nils
- Erik Almlöf (1891–1971), Swedish triple jumper
- Knut Almlöf (1829–1899), Swedish actor, husband of Betty
- Nils Almlöf (1799–1875), Swedish actor, husband of Charlotta
