= Ottilia Littmarck =

Swedish actress and director (1834–1929)

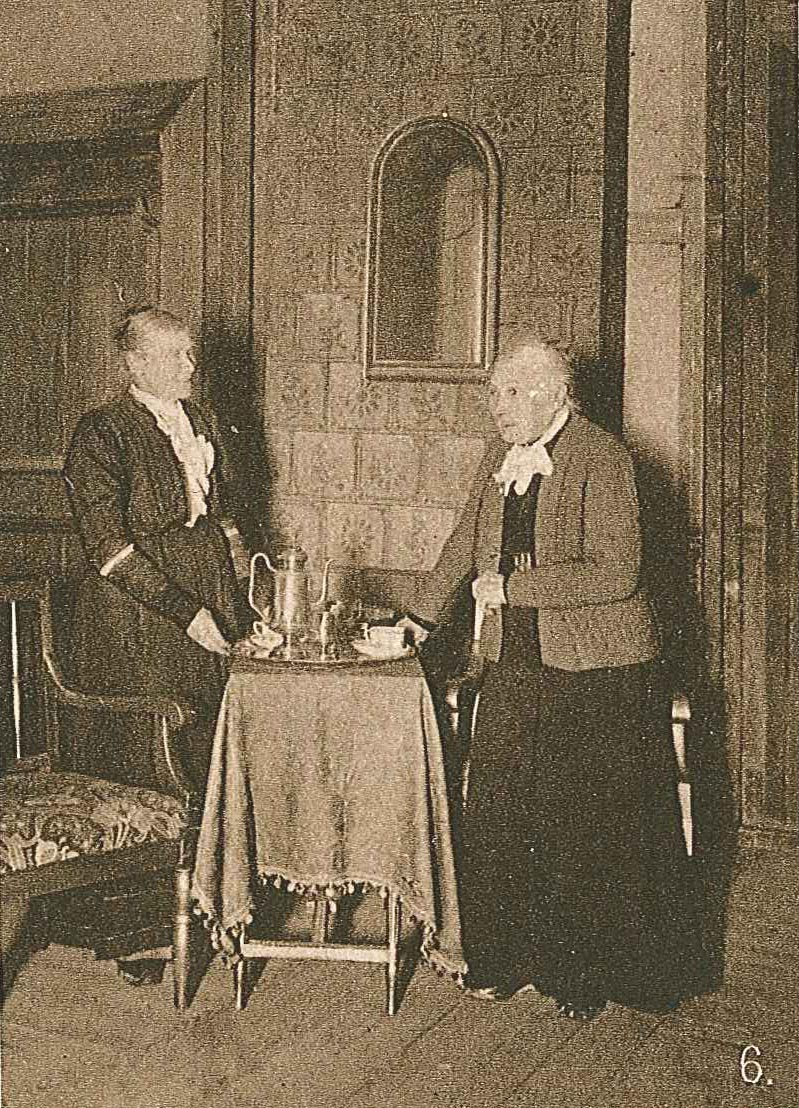
Scene from the play Evas systrar (= Eve's sisters) at Norrköpings teater 1916. The actresses are en:Amanda Rylander (1832-1920; left) and en:Ottilia Littmarck (1834-1929, right), who were also sisters in real life.

Ottilia Sofia Littmarck (22 June 1834– 14 July 1929) was a Swedish actress and theatre director. She was a noted actress in Sweden in the late 19th century.

== Biography ==
She was born in the parish of Jäder in Södermanland to inspector Johan Rylander and was the sister of the actresses Amanda Rylander (1832–1920) and Clara Björlin (1850-1905).

She was active in the travelling theatres of Pierre Deland, director of the Deland Theater Company in 1833–1861 with her sister Amanda in 1857–68. Between 1873 and '74, she was the director of Södra teatern in Stockholm. In 1875–79, she was active at the Swedish Theatre (Stockholm) before she established and managed her own theater company in 1880–83. She was active at the Swedish Theatre in Helsinki in Finland 1883–84, and at Swedish Theatre (Stockholm) 1885–89, and then at the Royal Dramatic Theatre in 1889–97. After this, she toured with her own theater company.

Littmarck was said to wish to play drama, but to be more suitable for comedy. Among her parts were Greta in Kärlek utan strumpor (Love without socks), Kerstin Giftekniv (Kerstin the marriage broker) in Den förvandlade brudgummen (Enchanted groom), Fru Pipping in Sodom och Gomorrha (Sodom and Gomorrah), Fru Kaklund (Mrs Kaklund) in Othellos triumf (Triumph of Othello), and Lais in Filosofi och kärlek (Philosophy and Love').

== See also ==
- Therese Elfforss
