= Amanda Rylander =

Swedish stage actress

Amanda Fredrika Rylander (14 October 1832, Jäder, Södermanland – 15 October 1920, Kvillinge, Östergötland) was a Swedish stage actress. She was a noted actress in Sweden in the late 19th-century.

She was born to the inspector Johan Rylander and the sister of the actresses Ottilia Littmarck and Clara Björlin.

She was active at the Anders Selinder theater company in 1857–59, the Pierre Deland theater in 1859–62, before she was employed at the Swedish Theatre in Helsinki in Finland in 1863. She was finally to be one of the most well known actors in Gothenburg, where she was active in 1870–90.

Rylander was popular within comedies. Her most noted roles were Fadette in Syrsan and Opportune in Fregattkaptenen. Her way of acting was described as warm and jolly.

== See also ==
- Charlotta Djurstrom
