= 1425 Tuorla =

Main-belt asteroid

Discovery
- Discovered by: K. Inkeri
- Discovery site: Turku Obs.
- Discovery date: 3 April 1937

Designations
- Named after: Tuorla Observatory (Inst. for Astronomy and Optics)
- Alternative designations: 1937 GB · 1950 KC; 1950 LQ
- Minor planet category: main-belt · (middle); Eunomia

Orbital characteristics
- Epoch 4 September 2017 (JD 2458000.5)
- Uncertainty parameter 0
- Observation arc: 67.14 yr (24,522 days)
- Aphelion: 2.8766 AU
- Perihelion: 2.3483 AU
- Semi-major axis: 2.6125 AU
- Eccentricity: 0.1011
- Orbital period (sidereal): 4.22 yr (1,542 days)
- Mean anomaly: 40.218°
- Mean motion: 0° 14^{m} 0.24^{s} / day
- Inclination: 12.975°
- Longitude of ascending node: 185.99°
- Argument of perihelion: 342.25°

Physical characteristics
- Dimensions: 11.795±0.874 km 14.34±1.08 km 14.94±1.1 km
- Synodic rotation period: 6.76±0.01 h (Note: Garceran (2013) web: rotation period hours with a brightness amplitude of mag. Summary figures for (1425) Tuorla at LCDB); 6.97±0.01 h 7.748±0.0027 h 7.75±0.06 h
- Geometric albedo: 0.2389 (derived); 0.2390±0.040; 0.260±0.041; 0.383±0.083
- Spectral type: S
- Absolute magnitude (H): 11.173±0.003 (R) · 11.30 · 11.4 · 11.91±0.41

1425 Tuorla, provisional designation 1937 GB, is a stony Eunomian asteroid from the central regions of the asteroid belt, approximately 14 kilometers in diameter. It was discovered on 3 April 1937, by Finnish astronomer Kustaa Inkeri at the Iso-Heikkilä Observatory in Turku, southwestern Finland. The asteroid was named after the Tuorla Observatory of the University of Turku. It was Kustaa Inkeri's only asteroid discovery.

== Orbit and classification ==
Tuorla is a member of the Eunomia family (502), a prominent family of stony asteroids and the largest one in the intermediate main belt with more than 5,000 members. It orbits the Sun at a distance of 2.3–2.9 AU once every 4 years and 3 months (1,542 days). Its orbit has an eccentricity of 0.10 and an inclination of 13° with respect to the ecliptic. The body's observation arc begins at Turku, the night before its official discovery observation.

== Physical characteristics ==
Tuorla has been characterized as a stony S-type asteroid by Pan-STARRS photometric survey, in accordance with the overall spectral type for members of the Eunomia family.

=== Rotation period ===
In April 2013, the so-far best-rated a rotational lightcurve of Tuorla was obtained from photometric observations by astronomer Vladimir Benishek at Belgrade Observatory in Serbia. Lightcurve analysis gave a well-defined rotation period of 7.75 hours (h) with a brightness variation of 0.24 magnitude (U=3). Other lightcurves were obtained by Alfonso Carreno Garceran (6.76 h), Laurent Bernasconi (7.75 h), and the Palomar Transient Factory (7.748 h),

=== Diameter and albedo ===
According to the surveys carried out by the Infrared Astronomical Satellite IRAS, the Japanese Akari satellite and the NEOWISE mission of NASA's Wide-field Infrared Survey Explorer, Tuorla measures between 11.795 and 14.94 kilometers in diameter and its surface has an albedo between 0.2390 and 0.383. The Collaborative Asteroid Lightcurve Link derives an albedo of 0.2389 and adopts a diameter of 14.94 kilometers from IRAS, based on an absolute magnitude of 11.3.

== Naming ==
This minor planet was named after the Tuorla Observatory, the Research Institute for Astronomy and Optics, of the University of Turku, located in Piikkiö near Turku, Finland. The Tuorla Observatory was established by prolific minor-planet discoverer Yrjö Väisälä in 1952, as an alternative to the Iso-Heikkilä Observatory, where this asteroid was discovered. The official naming citation was published by the Minor Planet Center on 30 January 1964 (M.P.C. 2277).
