= Deland =

Deland may refer to:

== People ==
- Betty Deland, Swedish actor
- Carolina Deland, Swedish actor
- Charlotta Deland, Swedish actor
- Henry Addison DeLand, American businessman
- Margaret Deland, American novelist, short story writer, and poet
- Pierre Deland, Swedish actor

== Places ==
- DeLand, Florida
- De Land, Illinois
