= Betty Deland =

Swedish actress (1831–1882)

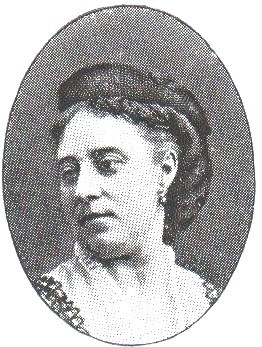
- Born: Hedvig Kristina Elisabeth Deland; 14 November 1831; Örebro, Sweden
- Died: 1 April 1882 (aged 50); Stockholm, Sweden
- Other name: Betty Almlöf
- Spouse: Knut Almlöf

Hedvig Kristina Elisabeth "Betty" Deland (14 November 1831 in Örebro – 1 April 1882 in Stockholm) was a Swedish stage actress. She was a principal of the Royal Dramatic Training Academy and belong to the elite of Swedish 19th-century actors. She was known as Betty Deland until 1857 and then as Betty Almlöf.

== Life ==
=== Early career ===
Betty Deland was the daughter of the actors Pierre Deland and Charlotta Deland. She was born into two famous Swedish theatrical families: her father was the director of the famous travelling Deland theater company, and her mother was the daughter of Isaac de Broen, director of the Djurgårdsteatern. She was the niece of Louis Deland.

Deland made her debut in the Royal Dramatic Theatre in 1836, the age of five, as a child actor in a boy's breeches role, Otto in Johanna of Montfaucon. The following years, she made a success in children's roles.

=== Stage career ===
Deland was engaged in her father's travelling Deland theater company from 1847 until 1861. She often performed a dance at the end of the performances of the Deland theater "with a cachucha, performed in a Spanish costume in a very delightful way and with some of her father's French grace".

She made her formal debut as an actress of her father's company in Uppsala in 1847. The travelling Deland theater was one of the most famed in both Sweden and Finland during its existence between 1833 and 1861: it performed in the theaters of smaller cities and towns in Sweden and Finland, which seldom had a permanent staff at this time, and inaugurated several of the new theaters which was erected during this time, when many small cities built their first permanent theater buildings to house the travelling theater companies. In Stockholm, they often performed in the Djurgårdsteatern, and in Finland, the Deland company regularly performed in the Åbo Svenska Teater, and they formed the first staff of the first national theater, the Swedish Theatre in Helsinki, which was inaugurated in the 1860–61 season. Deland was a significant member of the Deland theater and well known in Sweden and Finland, and during her years there, she performed 300 roles in comedy and vaudeville.

In 1857, she married the actor Knut Almlöf, and was henceforth known as Betty Almlöf. Her spouse was also from a theatrical family, son of Nils Almlöf and Brita Catharina Cederberg and stepson of Charlotta Almlöf.

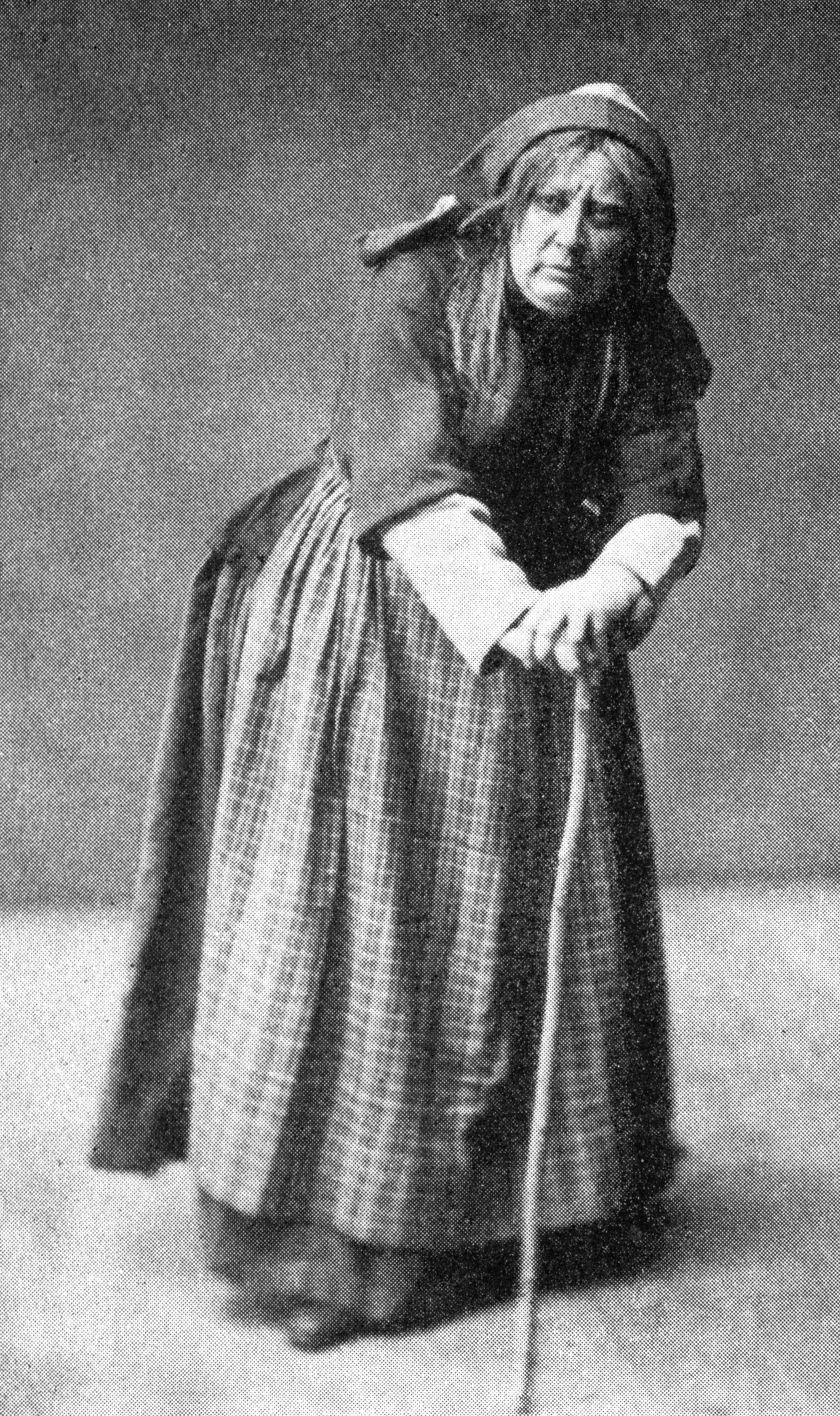
Betty Deland as Fadette

In 1861, Almlöf was at the Mindre teatern in Stockholm with her spouse. When the theater was incorporated to the Royal Dramatic Theatre in 1863, they were invited to stay. In 1866, she was contracted as a premier actress. She enjoyed great respect and came to have a successful career at the royal theater. She was active on the stage until the year of her death, in 1882.

Being previously known for comedy and vaudeville, her career shifted in the 1860s:

At Mindre teatern and even more after her engagement at the royal stage, she evolved to the character roles, where she with equal ability performed the most shifting types. The same truth, the same balance, the same striking strength of line and the same direction toward realism, which signified the art of her husband, was also found in her, fostered as she was in the strict school of her genius father.

She was praised for her expressive mimicry, her nuances of voice and her character acting, though her most popular roles mentioned in theater history remained those girls' roles and comic parts of the first half of her career.

Almlöf was an instructor and principal of the Royal Dramatic Training Academy jointly with her husband between 1874 and 1877.

=== Roles ===
Among her parts were Madame de Maintenon in Ludvig den fjortonde och markisinnan Maintenon (Louis XIV and Madame de Maintenon), Mrs Serpentier in Den gifta mannen i staden och på landet (The married man in the city and in the country), Emilia in Othello, the queen dowager Hedwig Eleonora in Carl den elfte (Charles XI) by Teodor Hagberg, Belise in Lärdt folk i stubb (The precieuses) by Molière, Mrs Dupuis in Ett hem (A home) by Feuillet, Fadette in Syrsan (Le petite Fadette) by George Sand, Dorine in Tartuffe, the Duchess of Marlborough in Ett glas vatten (A glass of water), Frosine in Den girige (The greedy one) by Molière, Madam Rundholmen in De ungas förbund (The union of the young) by Ibsen and the Duchess in Sällskap där man har tråkigt (Company where one is bored) by Pailleron.
