= Elise Hwasser =

Swedish actress (1831–1894)

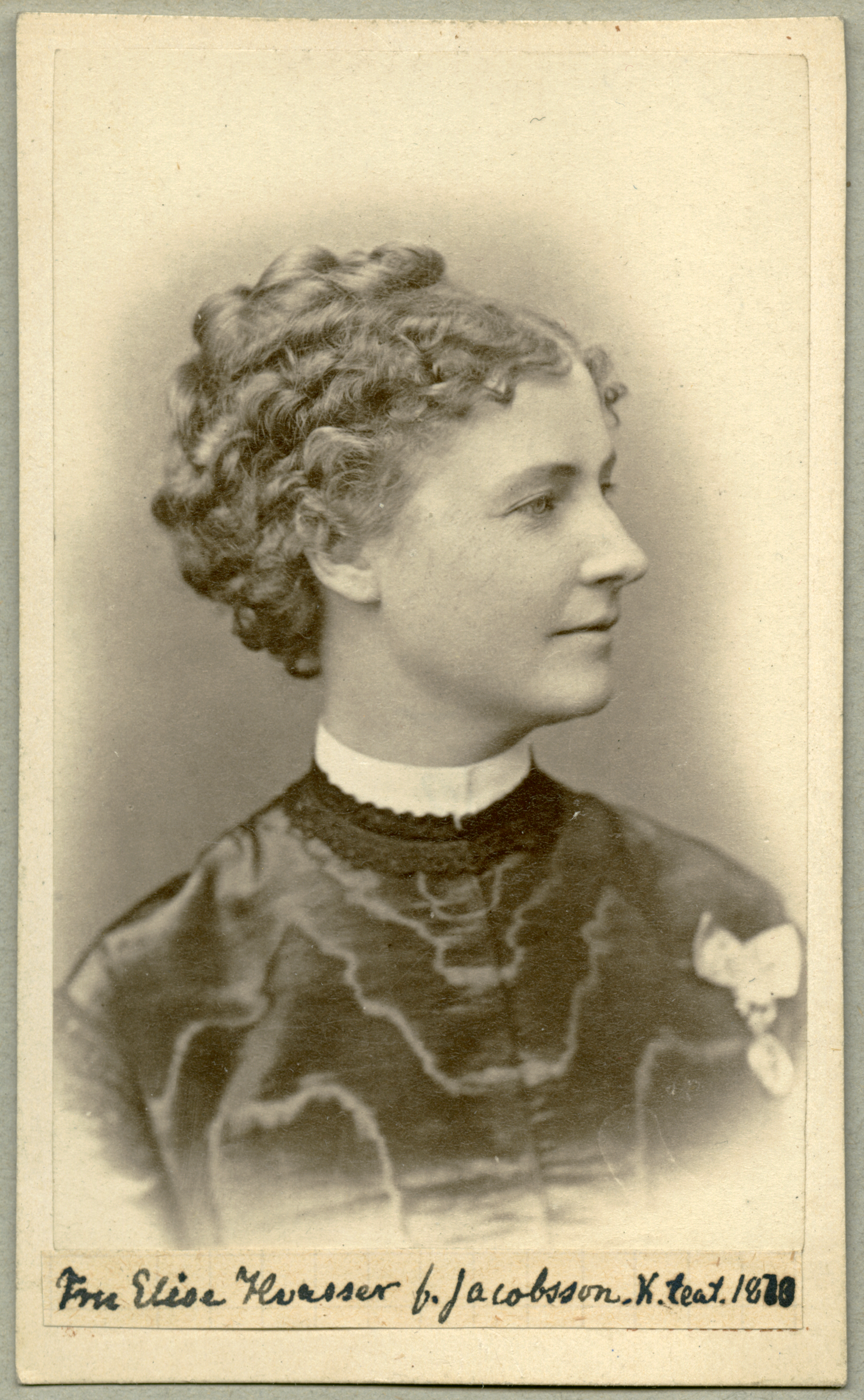
- Hwasser in 1870
- Born: Ebba Charlotta Jakobsson; 16 March 1831; Stockholm, Sweden
- Died: 28 January 1894 (age 62); Fiskebäckskil, Sweden
- Other names: Elise Jakobsson, Elise Hwasser, Elise Jakobsson-Hwasser
- Occupation: Actress
- Spouse: Daniel Hwasser

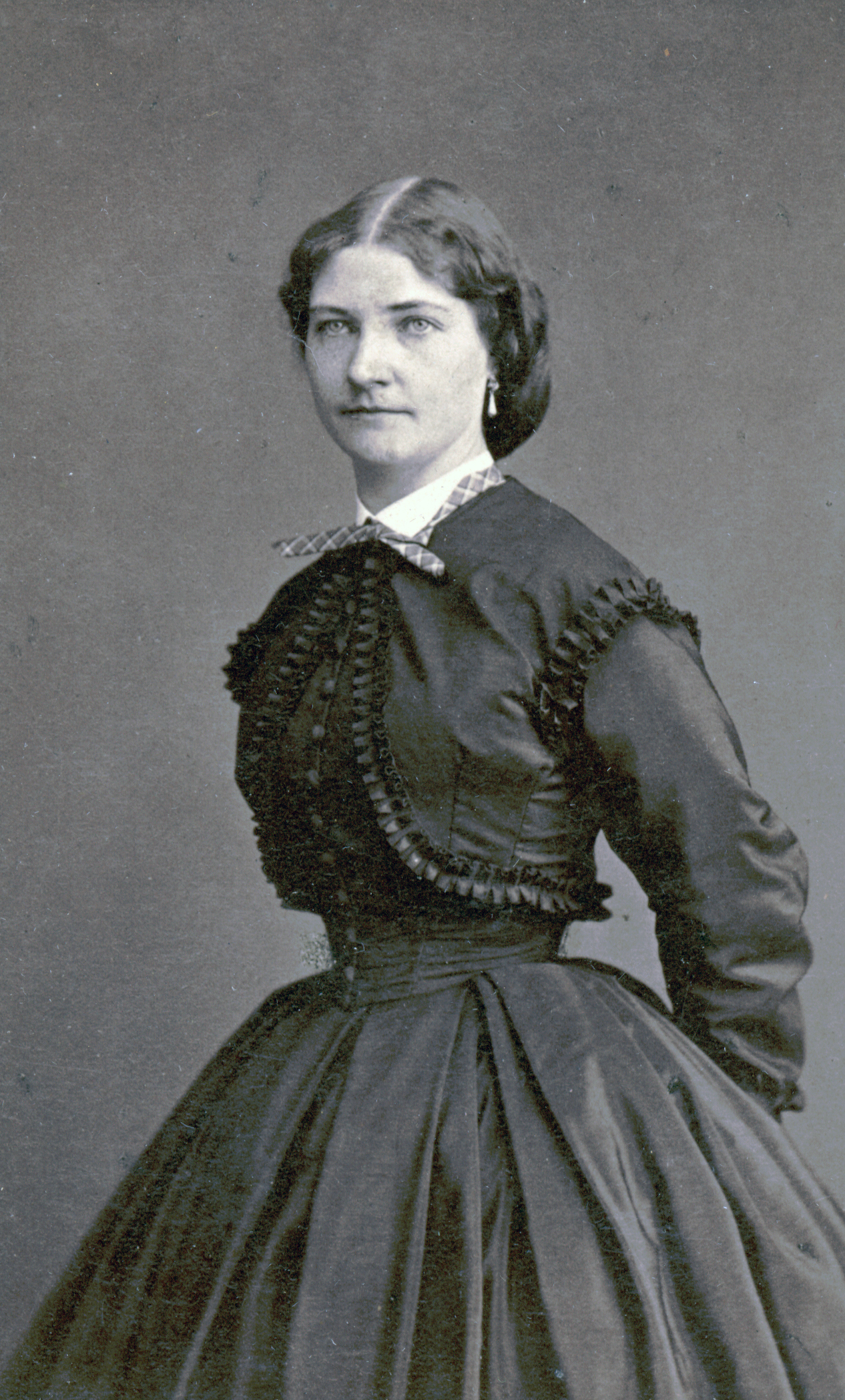
Elise Hwasser (1866)

Ebba Charlotta Elise Hwasser née Jakobsson (16 March 1831 – 28 January 1894) was a Swedish stage actress. She was an elite actor and has been referred to as the leading lady of the Royal Dramatic Theatre in the mid-19th century.

== Life ==
Elise Jakobsson was born in Stockholm as the daughter of the custom caretaker Johannes Magnus Jacobson and Catharina (Cajsa) Maria Bergström. As a child, she worked as the gofer of her elder sister, and delivered the artificial flowers her sister made to her clients.

=== Career ===
She was enrolled as a student at the Royal Dramatic Training Academy in 1848. She was given a position as actress student of the Royal Dramatic Theatre in 1849 and employed as an actress in 1850, initially as a replacement for Aurora Strandberg (1826–1850). In 1853, she was contracted as a premier actress at the theater, and in 1863, she was given a contract for life.

Hwasser was early noted to have high talent. Already in 1850, Fredrik August Dahlgren commented of her: "The actress Mlle Jacobson acted excellently. She is the only dramatic actor worth seeing at present. Acting with much illusion. I have not seen anything like it on that stage for years."

Elise Hwasser was regarded to be the first on the royal stage capable of truly filling the place of stage actress Emilie Högqvist (1812–1846) in the so-called ingenue and heroine parts, but was progressively given main roles also in realistic drama, and her career and development from romantic ingenue to character actress has been said to illustrate the transfer of romanticism to realism which occurred in the Swedish theater stage during her years as the leading elite actress of the Royal theater. By the 1860s, she was known as an actress who personified the modern trend of realism within the theater. Her way of acting was described as versatile, and she was praised by the critics as an artist who could play any part, which was a new invention at that time, as actors had until that time had often only kept to their specific genre of roles and not been expected to be able to play different kinds of characters.

She played Ophelia, Juliet (1872), Desdemona (1858), Mary Stuart (1868) and Cleopatra (1881) with success, but her most acclaimed roles were as characters in popular novels, such as Jane Eyre (1854). She managed to play Nora convincingly in Ibsen's A Doll's House as late as 1881, when she had reached the age of fifty, and was regarded as perhaps the most noted Ibsen actor of the royal stage. She was popular in so called breeches roles: her voice was described as very deep and suitable for such parts.

In 1865, Elise Hwasser became the first woman to be given the Litteris et Artibus. In 1881, she was given the Gold Medal of the Swedish Academy.

=== Private life ===
Elise Hwasser's private lifestyle was considered eccentric, as she enjoyed smoking cigars and pipes and drinking punch, which was at that time regarded to be masculine habits, and she was seen as an emancipated woman. She was reportedly interested in the contemporary Women's movement and in how the roles she performed in the plays she participated in portrayed the lives and circumstances of women. She was particularly interested in Ibsen in that regard.

At one point, Elise Hwasser had a brief affair with the Crown Prince, the future Charles XV of Sweden. Reportedly, it was Charles who advised her to marry Daniel Hwasser (1817–1871) whom she married in 1858.

That year, her spouse was appointed director of the Royal Dramatic Theatre. In parallel, Elise Hwasser was given more main roles within the productions of the theater, which resulted in her breakthrough. This chain of events did not go unnoticed, and there where accusations made of nepotism. However, as the ability of Elise Hwasser was evident, the matter soon died out. She was given main roles because of her own talent for many years after the crown prince had acquired a new lover and her spouse was no longer director. Privately, the Hwasser couple entertained a large social circle, not only in artistic circles, but also socialized in the intimate and informal intimate circle of King Charles XV, especially during the summer vacations of the royal court at Ulriksdal Palace.

Elise Hwasser retired in 1888. She was the mother of the actress Anna Lisa Hwasser-Engelbrecht (1861–1918). She died in her villa Västråt in Fiskebäckskil in 1894.

== Repertoire ==
Among her parts were:

- Isabella of Portugal in En saga av... (A fairy tale..) by Scribe opposite Nils Almlöf, Charlotta Almlöf and Zelma Hedin the 1851–52 season,
- Isabelle in Skolan för äkta män (School for husbands) by Molière opposite Zelma Hedin and Georg Dahlquist (1855–56),
- the main parts in Ladyn av Worsley Hall (The lady of Worsley hall) by Birch-Pfeiffer opposite Edvard Swartz and Gustav Sundberg,
- Älvjungfrun (The Fairy Maiden) by J. Heiberg opposite Nils Almlöf and Zelma Hedin,
- Fröken de la Segliére (Miss de la Segliere) by Sandeau (1857–58), Desdemona in Othello opposite Dahlquist, Fanchon in Syrsan (Le petite Fadette) by George Sand opposite Charlotte Forsman and Karolina Bock (1858–59),
- Tekla in Wallensteins död (The death of Wallenstien) by Schiller opposite Dahlquist and Nils Almlöf 1859–60, Puck in En mindsommarnattsdröm (A midsummer night's dream) opposite Axel Elmlund and Nils Almlöf, Karin Månsdotter in Erik XIV by Lidner opposite Swartz, Fanny Westerdahl and Signe Hebbe in 1860–61, teacher in Blommor i drivbänk opposite Zelma Hedin and Karolina Bock 1862–63, Myrrha in Sardanapalus by Byron opposite Edvard Swartz in 1864–65, Sigrid in Bröllopet på Ulfåsa (The wedding at Ulfåsa) by Hedberg opposite Axel Elmlund 1865–66, in Konstens vapen (The weapon of Art) opposite Nils Almlöf, Elmlund, Gustav Fredriksson, Helfrid Kinmansson, Betty Almlöf, Clementine Swartz and Knut Almlöf 1867–68, Selma in De Ungas förbund (The union of youths) by Ibsen 1869–70, Hermione in En vintersaga (A winter story) by Shakespeare opposite Edvard Swartz 1871–72, main female part in Män av ära (Men of honour) by Garaud and Skådespelerskan (The actress) by Leffler, 1873–74, Mlle de Maupas in Det besegrade lejonet (The defeated Lion) by Ponsard opposite Gustav Fredriksson, Elmlund and Sundberg 1875–76,
- Lona in Samhällets pelare (The pillar of society) by Ibsen opposite Ferdinand Thegerström 1877–78, in Severo Torelli by Copee opposite Georg Törnqvist and Elmlund 1885–86, Karoline opposite Ellen Hartman, Fredriksson and Elmlund in 1887–88. Her last part was queen Anna in Ett glas vatten (A glass of water) in the 1887–88 season.

== Other sources ==
- Lars Löfgren (2003). Svensk teater (Stockholm: Natur & Kultur) ISBN 91-27-09672-6. (in Swedish)
- Henrikson, Alf (1988) Fram till Nybroplan: om Kungliga Dramatiska teatern (Wiken, Höganäs) ISBN 91-7024-445-6 (in Swedish)
- Thorsten Dahl (1944) Svenska män och kvinnor. Nr 3 (Stockholm: Bonnier)
- Österberg, Carin, Lewenhaupt, Inga & Wahlberg, Anna Greta (1990) Svenska kvinnor: föregångare nyskapare (Signum, Lund) (Swedish)
- Nordensvan, Georg (1918) Svensk teater och svenska skådespelare från Gustav III till våra dagar. Andra delen, 1842-1918 (Stockholm: Bonnier) (Swedish)
