= Zelma Hedin =

Swedish actress (1827–1874)

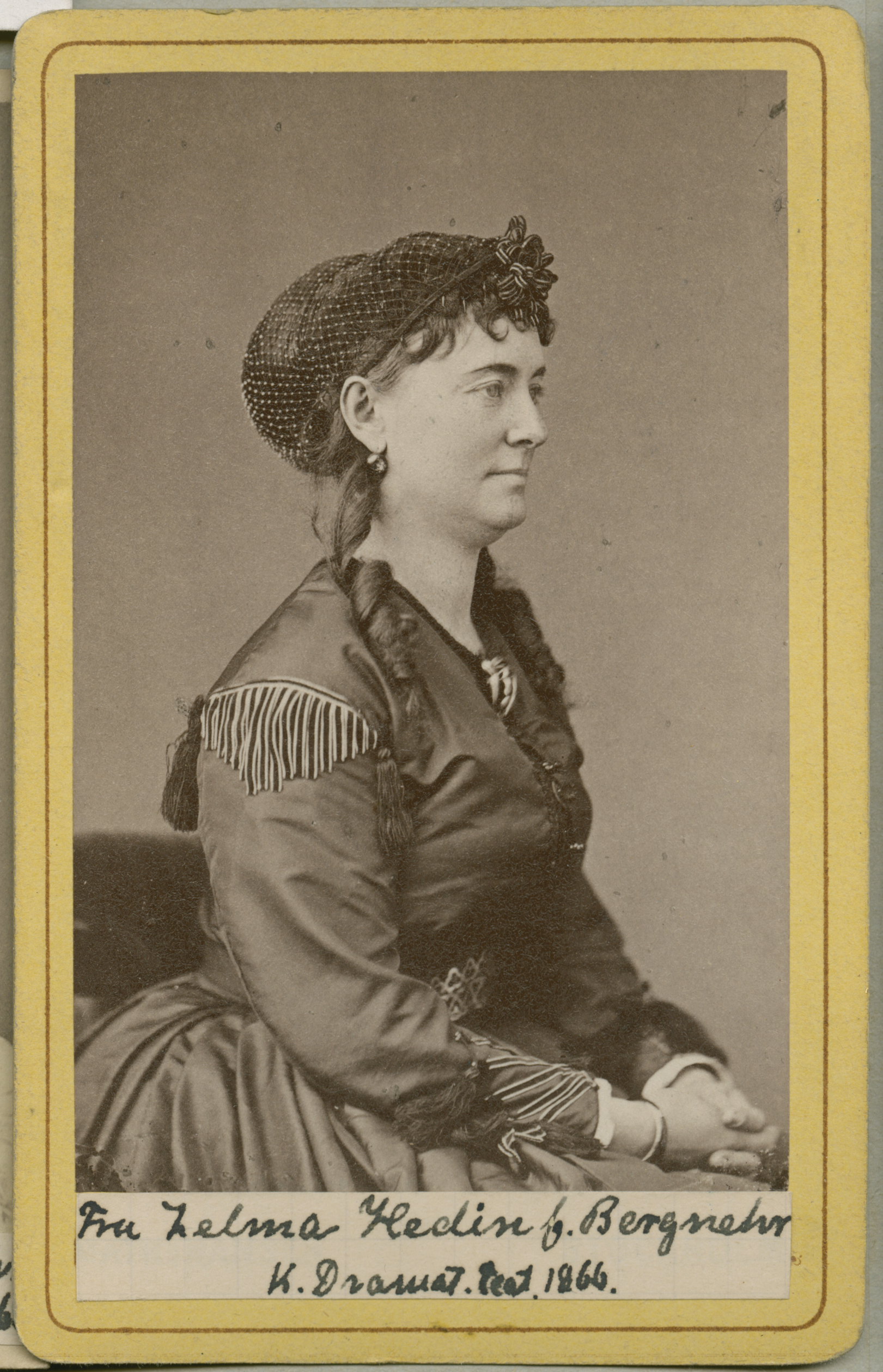
- Born: Zelma Carolina Esolinda Bergnéhr; 31 May 1827; Stockholm, Sweden
- Died: 11 February 1874 (age 46); Stockholm, Sweden
- Other names: Zelma Bergnéhr, Zelma Kinmansson, Zelma Bergmansson
- Spouse(s): Gustaf Kinmansson, Gustaf Hedin

Zelma Carolina Esolinda Hedin (née Bergnéhr; 31 May 1827 – 11 February 1874) was a Swedish stage actress. She was an elite actress of the Royal Dramatic Theatre, where she belonged to the star actors in the mid-19th century. She was also known as Zelma Bergnéhr, Zelma Kinmansson and Zelma Bergmansson.

== Early life ==
Zelma Bergnéhr was born in Stockholm to the lieutenant customs inspector Carl Vilhelm Bergnéhr (1803–47) and Charlotta Vilhelmina Christina Philp (1799–1871). She was the sister of the opera singer Leocadi Bergnéhr-Fossmo, the half sister of the star actress Gurli Åberg, and the cousin of the actress Laura Bergnéhr (d. 1852), known as the mistress of Charles XV of Sweden.

=== Career ===
Zelma Hedin was enrolled in the Royal Dramatic Training Academy in 1840, made her debut at the Royal Dramatic Theatre 8 December 1842, and was contracted as an actress there between 1845 and 1868 (from 1852 as a premier actress).

Zelma Hedin made a success in the French salon comedies, a very popular and fashionable genre of the time, in which she was seen as the successor of Emilie Högquist, and she gradually replaced Charlotta Almlöf in coquette roles. According to a critic, while Charlotta Almlöf had always been shallow and superficial in seduction scenes, for Hedin "...flirtatiousness seemed to me to be a profession". She was famed for the elegance of her costume which was called "truly Parisian", was said to have "a grande and beautiful figure", and critics claimed that she attracted attention more for her appearance than for her ability and characterized her popular romantic roles as a "hallow declamation". She was however recognized as "an excellent utility, en rare representative of the socialite ladies of the finer French comedy, a terrific grisette and soubrette..." and as a singer well suited for vaudeville.

In the 1850s – after the golden age of Charlotta Almlöf and Fanny Westerdahl and prior to the breakthrough of Elise Hwasser – Zelma Hedin was reportedly the leading star actress of the Royal Dramatic Theatre, and in the season 1856–57 it was said that she had no rivals, "acted as the Grande Intrigante both on and off the stage" and exerted an influence "which was not without opposition". An incident describing her position was when The Merchant of Venice was cancelled because Hedin, after having learned the role of Portia, suddenly refused to play it the night of the premier, and no other actress had the time to study the part.

Her position was reflected in her salary. In 1856 she was granted a salary of 6000 riksdaler, the same as Elise Hwasser, which had been granted after she had threatened to resign: in comparison, Louise Michaeli, the prima donna of the Royal Swedish Opera, was given 8000, and the lead male star of the Royal Dramatic Theatre, Nils Almlöf, less at 3000.

After the breakthrough of Elise Hwasser, the diva conduct of Hedin was less tolerated, which is given as a reason to why she retired voluntarily from the royal stage in 1868 when she was reportedly still in the high point of her ability. Another factor was that she had broken her leg in 1865 and was no longer able to keep up the same intense work schedule. She was active at the Mindre teatern in 1868–69, and performed as a guest actor at the Royal Dramatic Theatre in 1869–73. She made her last performance at a soaré at the Södra Teatern in Stockholm in 1873.

Zelma Hedin was also active as a concert singer, and performed as such in Turku in Finland in 1857.

=== Roles ===
Among her parts where Elisabet in Doktor Wespe (Doctor Wespe), Georgina in Qväkaren och dansösen (The Quaker and the dancer) by Scribe, Richelieu in Richelieus första vapenbragd (The first bravery of Richelieu) by Bayard, Sofie Arnould in Jag äter middag hos min mor (I will be having dinner with my mother), mrs de Nohan in Den gifte mannen i staden och på landet (The married man in the city and in the country), and Mrs. Montjoye in Montjoye by Dalayrac; she also performed as Rosaura in Lifvet en dröm (Life is a dream) by Calderon, Mossamor in Marsk Stigs döttrar (The daughters of Marschal Stig) by Josephsson and the "burlesuqe" part of mrs Godard in En fattig ädling (A poor noble) by Dumanoir.

=== Private life ===
Zelma Hedin married the actor Gustaf Kinmansson (1822–1887) in 1845, and divorced him in 1853. The first year after her divorce, she called herself "Mrs Bergmansson", and in 1854, she married accountant Gustaf Hedin (1825–1894, brother of the actor Anders Hedin), after which she became known as Zelma Hedin.

Hedin died in Stockholm.
