= Erik Djurström =

Swedish actor and director

- Born: 22 February 1787; City of Stockholm
- Died: 17 September 1841 (aged 54); Jönköpings Kristina församling

Erik Wilhelm Djurström (né Strandberg; 22 February 1787, Stockholm – 17 September 1841, Jönköping) was a Swedish stage actor. He was the director of the travelling Djurström theater company, which was one of the best known in the first half of the nineteenth century.

== Biography ==
Erik Djurström was the son of the lawspeaker Erik Vilhelm Strandberg, and given a good education. In 1807, he was engaged as an actor at the Djurgårdsteatern in Stockholm, upon which he took the name Djurström. After his debut he toured Sweden as a member of the theater company of Fredrik Wilhelm Ståhlberg, and from 1819 his Stålberg's widow Fredrika Gustafva Ståhlberg.

Upon the death of his employer director Fredrika Gustafva Ståhlberg in 1824, he took over the theater company as its director. The Djurström theater company was regarded as the perhaps most prestigious of the travelling theaters in Sweden of its time, and held a high artistic standard compared to the others in the yes of several contemporary critics. Erik Djurström was described as an intelligent artist with refined manner and good taste who translated many foreign plays to Swedish and introduced them on the Swedish stage, and has been referred to as the most noted theater director in Sweden of his time.

He was described as passionate but tolerant and was well liked as an employer for not interfering in his actors' private lives. As an example of his tolerance, it was noted that he did not interfere in the fact that his lead female singer Angelique Magito lived with and had children with one of the actors without being married to him, something that was not a given thing during this epoch. He was also given unusual respect in a time when the acting profession had a low social status: it was said that every time his theater company arrived to a town, he was invited to dine with professors and officials and held receptions behind the stage.

Erik Djurström was first married to the dancer Charlotta Strandberg, and second to his lead actress Charlotta Djurström, who succeeded him as director.
