= Thérèse Elfforss =

Swedish actress and theatre director (1823–1905)

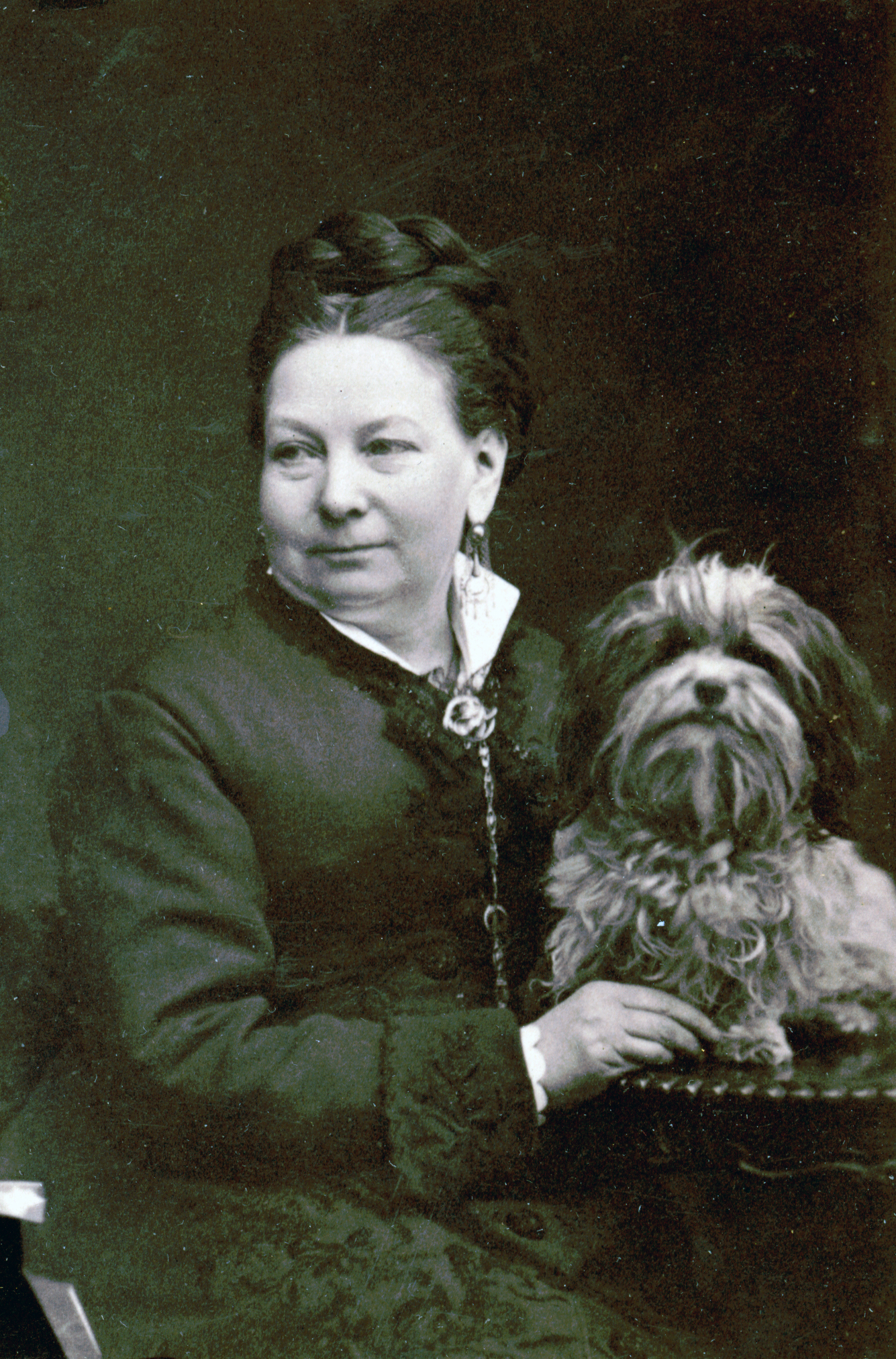
- Thérèse Elfforss
- Born: Antoinette Thérèse Öberg; 30 November 1823; Stockholm, Sweden
- Died: 16 April 1905 (aged 81); Stockholm, Sweden
- Other name: Therese Öberg
- Spouse: Lars Erik Elfforss

Antoinette Thérèse Elfforss (née Öberg; 30 November 1823 – 16 April 1905) was a Swedish stage actress and theatre director. She was the managing director of the travelling Elfforss Theater Company between 1869 and 1888.

== Background ==
Thérèse Elfforss was born in Stockholm, the daughter of the factory owner Anders Öberg and Maria Elisabeth Kannström. She was a student of the school of the Royal Swedish Ballet from 1837 and the Royal Dramatic Training Academy from 1839.

== Career ==
She was active at the Royal Dramatic Theatre in 1837–42. Between 1842 and 1846, she was active at the Nya Teatern. In 1847, she married the actor Lars Erik Elfforss (1817-1869), director of his own recently formed theater company. Subsequently, she performed under the name Thérèse Elfforss. She was an actress with the travelling Elfforss Theater Company and from 1886 to 1888 served as its director. She took over the leadership of the theater company during her husband's illness and formally after his death in 1869.

As an actress, Thérèse Elfforss started in roles as ingenue and heroine but moved on to character roles in modern Nordic and foreign plays of the new realistic movement. According to a critic: "Her performances was characterized by spirituality, fine details, lively vitality", and in recognition of her ability, she was given the sobriquet "The Elise Hwasser of the countryside", after the renowned actress of the Royal Dramatic Theatre, who was at that time regarded the greatest actress in Sweden.

Thérèse Elfforss enjoyed great respect during her career, particularly in her capacity as a director:

"Mrs E. was the most noted women theater director in 19th-century Sweden, and the Elfforss company was regarded as the best travelling theater in the nation during the 1870s and 1880s. The repertoire as well as the acting was of the highest level, and the director was widely respected and loved for her excellent personal virtues. As regard to the financial side of the affairs Mrs E. would likely be uncontested among all travelling theater directors. She belong to the very few among them, who were able to leave a small fortune at her passing."

As director, she focused on Nordic plays, such as Swedish plays by F. A. Dahlgren, C. Axel Anrep, Emilie Lundberg, but also Lorentz Dietrichson, Bjørnstjerne Bjørnson and Ibsen. Her greatest financial success was, however, Around the World in Eighty Days by Jules Verne, and she also staged less serious operettas, because "During the grand days of the Elfforss company in the 1870s and 1880s, the taste for operettas was so great that such an economic and practical director as Mrs E. could scarcely ignore it."

Her company performed with success at the Djurgårdsteatern at Djurgården in Stockholm, and toured Finland in 1869, 1870, 1874, 1877 and 1878.

In 1888, she transformed the leadership to stage director and theatre manager August Lindberg (1846–1916) after which the theater company changed its name to the Lindeberg Theater Company. She continued to perform in the Lindeberg company until 1893. Between 1890 and 1893, the Lindeberg company staffed the Stora Teatern in Gothenburg. When the Lindeberg company was dissolved in 1893, she retired with her son Julius Erik Engelbrekt Elfforss (1847- 1925) to Stockholm where she died in 1905.

== See also ==
- Margareta Seuerling
- Charlotta Djurstrom

== Other sources ==
- Österberg, Carin et al. (1990) Svenska kvinnor: föregångare, nyskapare (Lund: Signum) ISBN 91-87896-03-6
- Nordensvan, Georg (1918) Svensk teater och svenska skådespelare från Gustav III till våra dagar. Andra delen, 1842-1918 (Stockholm: Bonnier)
