= 1540 Kevola =

Main-belt asteroid

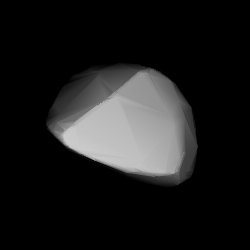
- Shape model of Kevola from its lightcurve

Discovery
- Discovered by: L. Oterma
- Discovery site: Turku Observatory
- Discovery date: 16 November 1938

Designations
- Named after: Kevola Observatory
- Alternative designations: 1938 WK · 1926 GT; 1933 UM · 1933 WR; 1936 KL · 1937 QG; 1940 EJ
- Minor planet category: main-belt · (outer) background

Orbital characteristics
- Epoch 4 September 2017 (JD 2458000.5)
- Uncertainty parameter 0
- Observation arc: 91.23 yr (33,320 days)
- Aphelion: 3.0937 AU
- Perihelion: 2.6068 AU
- Semi-major axis: 2.8502 AU
- Eccentricity: 0.0854
- Orbital period (sidereal): 4.81 yr (1,758 days)
- Mean anomaly: 37.259°
- Mean motion: 0° 12^{m} 17.28^{s} / day
- Inclination: 11.971°
- Longitude of ascending node: 52.468°
- Argument of perihelion: 113.68°

Physical characteristics
- Dimensions: 37.12±13.60 km 40.16±0.59 km 40.22±13.69 km 43.875±0.318 km 44.18±1.7 km 44.22 km (derived)
- Synodic rotation period: 20.071±0.0119 h 20.082±0.001 h
- Geometric albedo: 0.0433±0.004; 0.0474 (derived); 0.048±0.008; 0.05±0.04; 0.053±0.002; 0.06±0.05
- Spectral type: C (assumed)
- Absolute magnitude (H): 10.640±0.003 (R) · 10.70 · 10.80 · 10.83 · 10.83±0.36

1540 Kevola (provisional designation 1938 WK) is a dark background asteroid from the outer regions of the asteroid belt, approximately 42 kilometers in diameter. It was discovered on 16 November 1938, by astronomer Liisi Oterma at the Iso-Heikkilä Observatory in Turku, Finland. The asteroid was named after the Finnish Kevola Observatory.

== Orbit and classification ==
Kevola is a non-family asteroid of the main belt's background population. It orbits the Sun in the outer asteroid belt at a distance of 2.6–3.1 AU once every 4 years and 10 months (1,758 days). Its orbit has an eccentricity of 0.09 and an inclination of 12° with respect to the ecliptic.

The body's observation arc begins with its first identification as 1926 GT at Heidelberg Observatory in April 1926, more than 12 years prior to its official discovery observation at Turku.

== Naming ==
This minor planet was named for the Finnish Kevola Observatory (064). The official naming citation was published by the Minor Planet Center on 20 February 1976 (M.P.C. 3930).

== Physical characteristics ==
Kevola is an assumed carbonaceous C-type asteroid.

=== Rotation period ===
In February 2007, a rotational lightcurve of Kevola was obtained from photometric observations by French amateur astronomer Pierre Antonini. Lightcurve analysis gave a rotation period of 20.082 hours with a brightness variation of 0.23 magnitude (U=3-). Another lightcurve obtained by astronomers at the Palomar Transient Factory in October 2010, gave a concurring period of 20.071 hours with an amplitude of 0.33 magnitude (U=2).

=== Diameter and albedo ===
According to the surveys carried out by the Infrared Astronomical Satellite IRAS, the Japanese Akari satellite and the NEOWISE mission of NASA's Wide-field Infrared Survey Explorer, Kevola measures between 37.12 and 44.18 kilometers in diameter and its surface has an albedo between 0.0433 and 0.06.

The Collaborative Asteroid Lightcurve Link derives an albedo of 0.0474 and a diameter of 44.22 kilometers based on an absolute magnitude of 10.7.
