= Angelique Magito =

Swedish opera singer

Maria Sofia Angela "Angelique" Magito (1809–1895) was a Swedish opera singer, concert singer, and stage actress. She was one of the best-known artists of the travelling countryside theatres in Sweden and was called the "opera singer of the countryside".

== Life ==
Angelique Magito was born in Uppsala to an Italian member of the Svea Artillery Regiment, Pietro Magito. She became a student of the Royal Swedish Opera in 1817, where she was a student of Maria Franck and Karl Magnus Craelius. She made her debut at a concert at the German Church in Norrköping in 1826.

Magito was a member of a number of travelling theatre companies touring the countryside all over Sweden, most notably that of Erik Djurström and Charlotta Djurström between 1832 and 1850. She successfully performed as a singer when the theater company offered operatic and other lyric performances. Initially she performed the singing parts for Charlotta Djurström, but she was soon allowed to perform herself and became a very popular and well-known singer of the travelling countryside theater. She was described as a "Southern beauty" who became plump early on.

Magito had several children with a colleague. In 1855, she married the officer Ture Jerving and retired from stage. After her marriage, she remained active as a popular singer at church concerts. Following the death of her husband in 1883, however, she was placed in the poor house.

== Legacy ==
Angelique Magito is mentioned in the song En glad själs hem by Johan Gustaf Schultz.
