= Hilkka Rantaseppä-Helenius =

Finnish astronomer

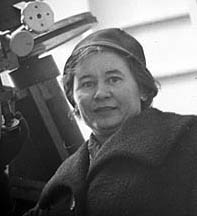
- Born: 1925
- Died: 7 May 1975 (aged 49–50); Paimio
- Scientific career
- Fields: Astronomy

Hilkka Rantaseppä-Helenius (1925–1975) was a Finnish astronomer.

Rantaseppä-Helenius began studying mathematics in hopes of becoming a teacher. Finnish astronomer Yrjö Väisälä inspired her to become an astronomer instead. Helenius, as a daughter of a farmer, was among the lucky few astronomers that had the privilege of having an observatory at their own corral.

Rantaseppä-Helenius worked on observing minor planets. She worked as an assistant at Tuorla Observatory from 1956 to 1962. In 1962 she became an observer when a vacancy became available. She remained an observer until 1975. She was also involved in building the Kevola Observatory by Tähtitieteellis-optillinen seura (Astronomy-Optical Society) on her own property in 1963.

Rantaseppä-Helenius died at age 50 in an accident. The Florian asteroid 1530 Rantaseppä was named in her memory.
