= Christina Margareta Cederberg =

Swedish actress and theatre manager

Christina Margareta Cederberg (1786–1858), was a Swedish actress and theatre manager.

She was the daughter of Carl Magnus Cederberg and Rebecca Momma and the sister of the actor Catharina Cederberg. She married the actor and theatre director Isaac de Broen in 1804, and became the mother of the actor Charlotta Deland and mother-in-law of Pierre Deland.

After the death of her husband in 1814, she took over the Djurgårdsteatern, at the time the only theatre allowed in the capital aside for the Royal Dramatic Theatre. She was the second woman to lead the theatre, after her mother-in-law. In 1815, she left the theatre to Karl Wildner, the husband of her sister-in-law.

In 1818, she married the actor Christoffer Svanberg, manager of a theatre company touring Sweden and often visited Gothenburg. Christina Cederberg was an actress of some repute and renown in the Swedish province theatre in the early 19th-century, particularly during her second marriage in the 1820s, when she toured the country as Mrs Svanberg: she was a well-known and popular actor, used as a role model to compare other actors to by the critics, and was described as the predecessor of the later famed Charlotta Djurström.

Her husband's theatre company was taken over by her son-in-law in 1833. They retired from stage in 1840.
