= Piikkiö railway station =

Railway station in Finland

Piikkiö railway station Piikkiön rautatieasema
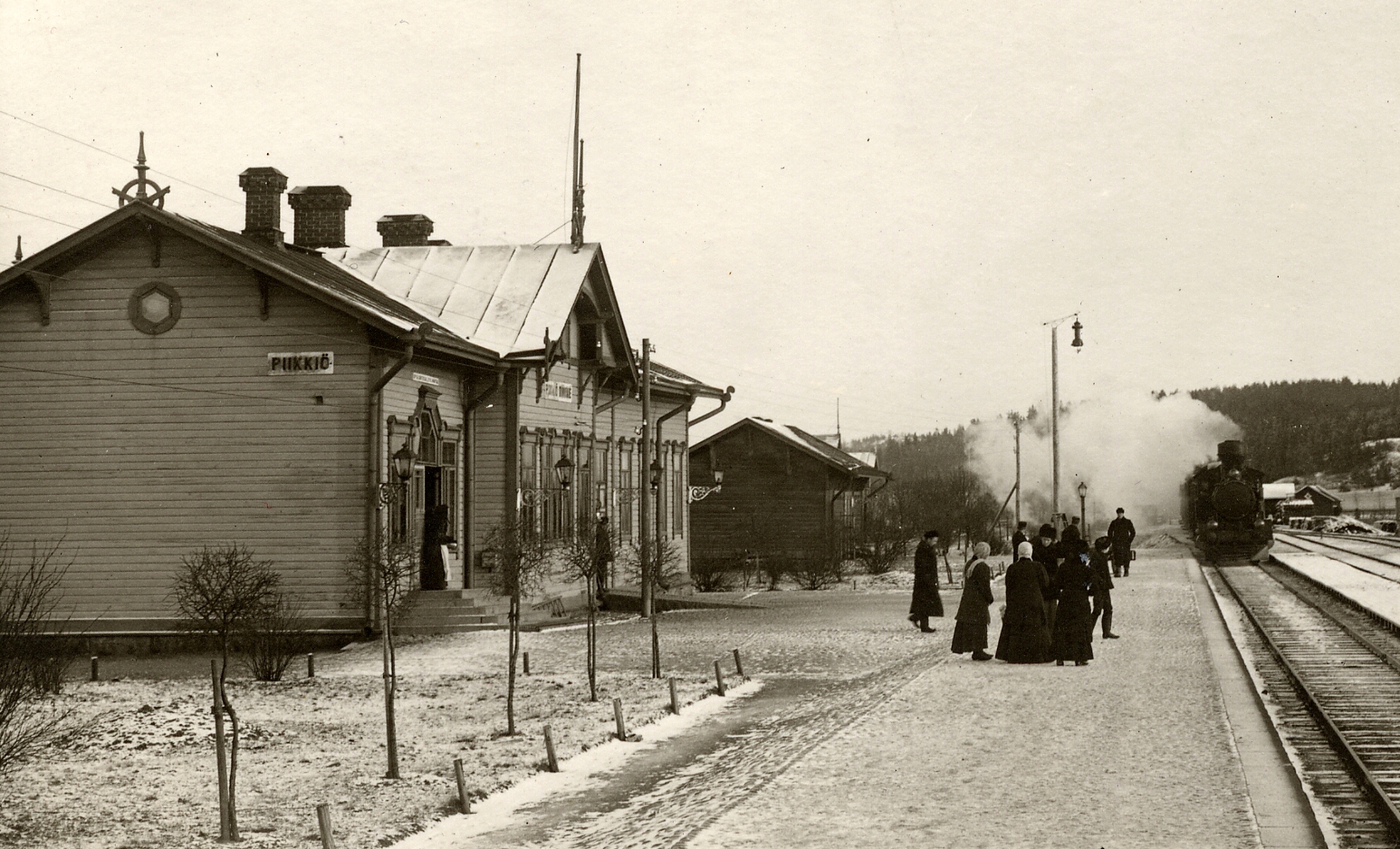
- Piikkiö railway station circa 1920

General information
- Location: Asematie 7, 21500 Piikkiö; Finland
- Coordinates: 60°25′24″N 022°30′57″E
- Operator: VR

History
- Opened: 1 November 1889
- Closed: 26 May 1979
Location

Piikkiön rautatieasema is a railway station in the municipality of Kaarina, Piikkiö, near Turku, Finland. It was opened in 1889. The station building, designed by a Finnish architect Bruno Granholm was built in 1888 and later expanded in 1922. The last train stopped at the station on May 26, 1979.

The station is located in the central area of the town of Piikkiö.

In September 2016, the railway station was sold to a private buyer.

== See also ==
- VR (Finnish Railways)
