= Maria Elisabet de Broen =

Swedish translator and theatre manager

Maria Elisabet de Broen née Grundt (23 April 1756 – 1 May 1809), was a Swedish translator and theatre manager.

== Biography ==
She was the daughter of Isak Grundt and married the actor and theatre director Abraham de Broen in 1780; they had eight children, many of whom became well known actors. She was the mother of Isaac de Broen and grandmother of Charlotta Deland.

After the death of her husband in 1804, she took over the Djurgårdsteatern, at the time the only theatre allowed in the capital aside for the Royal Dramatic Theatre, and worked successfully as its manager until her death. Under her guidance the theatre also toured the country and visited Gothenburg several times.

Broen was a personality of the contemporary cultural world in Sweden. She is known as the translator of The School for Scandal by Richard Brinsley Sheridan to the Swedish language (1789). Aside from the theatre she also owned a coffee house, and are noted to have sent food to Carl Michael Bellman during his imprisonment in 1794.
