= 1530 Rantaseppä =

Stony Florian asteroid from the inner regions of the asteroid belt

Discovery
- Discovered by: Y. Väisälä
- Discovery site: Turku Obs.
- Discovery date: 16 September 1938

Designations
- Named after: Hilkka Rantaseppä-Helenius (Finnish astronomer)
- Alternative designations: 1938 SG
- Minor planet category: main-belt · Flora

Orbital characteristics
- Epoch 4 September 2017 (JD 2458000.5)
- Uncertainty parameter 0
- Observation arc: 78.63 yr (28,720 days)
- Aphelion: 2.6962 AU
- Perihelion: 1.8005 AU
- Semi-major axis: 2.2483 AU
- Eccentricity: 0.1992
- Orbital period (sidereal): 3.37 yr (1,231 days)
- Mean anomaly: 139.43°
- Mean motion: 0° 17^{m} 32.64^{s} / day
- Inclination: 4.4184°
- Longitude of ascending node: 285.88°
- Argument of perihelion: 84.678°

Physical characteristics
- Dimensions: 5.044±0.058 km 5.195±0.054 km 5.93 km (calculated)
- Synodic rotation period: 3.5258±0.0005 h (Note: Pravec (2016) web: rotation period 3.5258±0.0005 hours with a brightness amplitude of 0.41 magnitude and an Quality Code of 3. Summary figures at Collaborative Asteroid Lightcurve Link (CALL) and Pravec, P.; Wolf, M.; Sarounova, L. (2016)) (Note: Lightcurve plot obtained by Petr Pravec from prepublished periods of asteroids of the Ondrejov NEO Photometric Program, see summary file)
- Geometric albedo: 0.24 (assumed); 0.3791±0.0941; 0.400±0.028
- Spectral type: S
- Absolute magnitude (H): 13.1 · 13.3

1530 Rantaseppä (provisional designation 1938 SG) is a stony Florian asteroid from the inner regions of the asteroid belt, approximately 5 kilometers in diameter. Discovered by Yrjö Väisälä at Turku Observatory in 1938, it was later named after Finnish astronomer Hilkka Rantaseppä-Helenius.

== Discovery ==
Rantaseppä was discovered on 16 September 1938, by Finnish astronomer Yrjö Väisälä at Turku Observatory in Southwest Finland. Two night later, the body was independently discovered by Belgian astronomer Eugène Delporte at Uccle Observatory. The body's observation arc begins at Uccle, one day after its official discovery observation at Turku.

== Classification and orbit ==
Rantaseppä is a member of the Flora family of stony asteroids, one of the largest families of the main belt. It orbits the Sun in the inner main-belt at a distance of 1.8–2.7 AU once every 3 years and 4 months (1,231 days). Its orbit has an eccentricity of 0.20 and an inclination of 4° with respect to the ecliptic.

== Physical characteristics ==
=== Lightcurve ===
In December 2016, a rotational lightcurve of Rantaseppä was obtained from photometric observations by Czech astronomer Petr Pravec at the Ondřejov Observatory and its photometric program of near-Earth objects. Lightcurve analysis gave a rotation period of 3.5258 hours with a relatively high brightness variation of 0.41 magnitude, which is indicative of a non-spheroidal shape (U=3).

=== Diameter and albedo ===
According to the survey carried out by NASA's Wide-field Infrared Survey Explorer with its subsequent NEOWISE mission, Rantaseppä measures 5.044 and 5.195 kilometers in diameter and its surface has an albedo of 0.3791 and 0.400, respectively. The Collaborative Asteroid Lightcurve Link assumes an albedo for a stony S-type asteroid of 0.24 – derived from 8 Flora, the family's largest member and namesake – and calculates a diameter of 5.93 kilometers with an absolute magnitude of 13.3.

== Naming ==
This minor planet was named in memory of Finnish astronomer Hilkka Rantaseppä-Helenius (1925–1975), an observer of comets and asteroids at the Turku Astronomical-Optical Institute of the University of Turku. The official naming citation was published by the Minor Planet Center on 20 February 1976 (M.P.C. 3929).
