= Charlotta Raa-Winterhjelm =

Swedish actress (1838–1907)

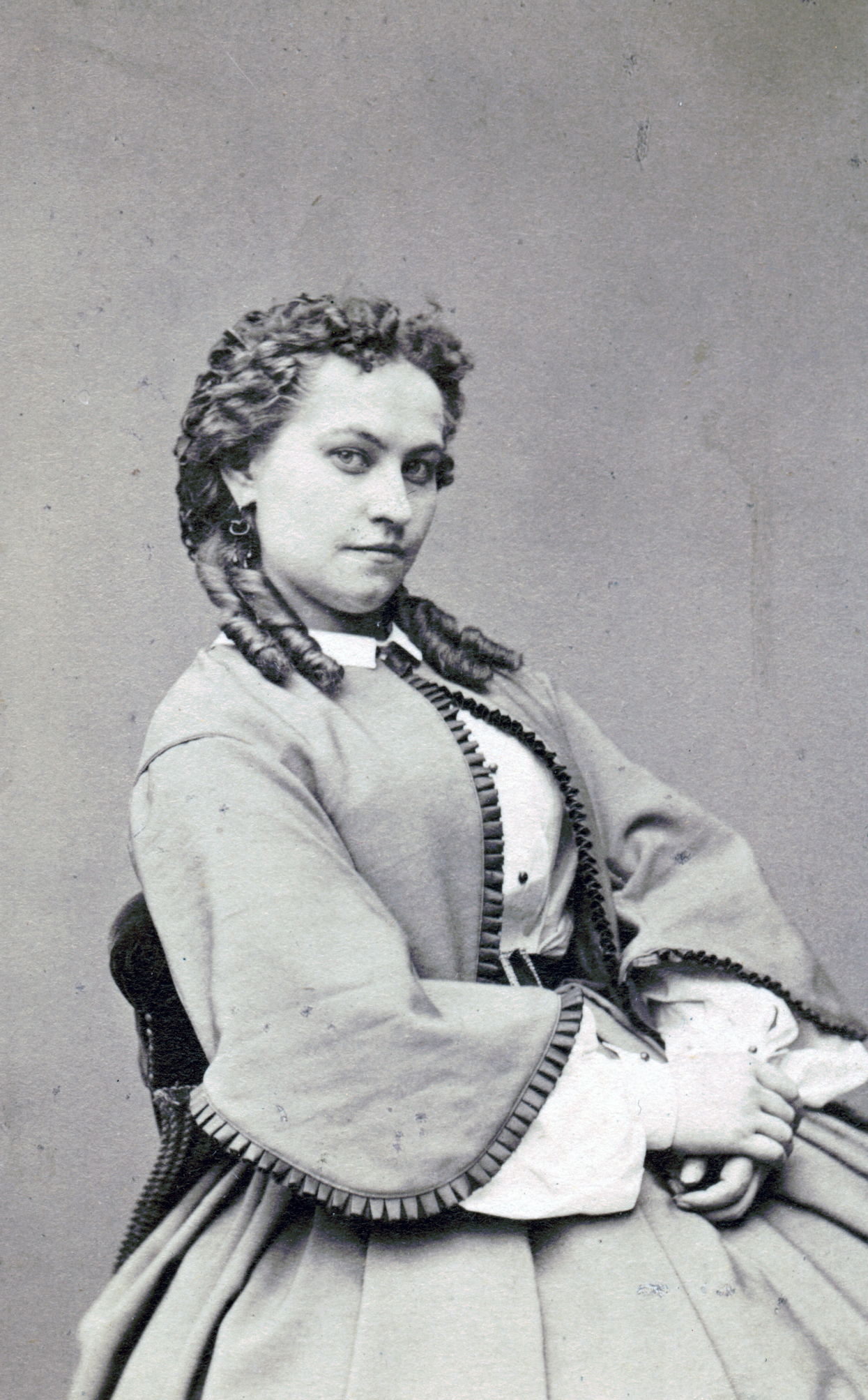
- Born: Charlotta Forssman; 20 November 1838; Stockholm, Sweden
- Died: 7 March 1907 (aged 68); Stockholm, Sweden
- Other name: Charlotta Raa
- Spouse: Fritiof Raa (first husband)

Hedvig Charlotta Raa-Winterhjelm, née Forssman (20 November 1838 – 7 March 1907), was a Swedish actress active in Sweden, Norway and Finland. She played a pioneer role in Finland by introducing Finnish as a stage language, becoming the first actor in Finland to speak her lines in the Finnish tongue.

== Early career ==
Charlotta Raa-Winterhjelm was born as the daughter of a goldsmith in Stockholm in Sweden under the name Charlotte Forssman. She studied at the Royal Dramatic Training Academy in Stockholm in 1854–56, after which she toured in travelling theater companies in Sweden and Finland.

In 1860, she was employed at the Mindre teatern in Stockholm. In 1863, Mindre teatern was taken over by the Royal Dramatic Theatre. Many of the actors was given a contract in the new theatre. The competition with Sweden's leading lady Elise Hwasser made her leave for a position at the theater in Gothenburg, where she was engaged until she left Sweden for a position at the Swedish Theatre in Helsinki in 1866.

The Swedish Theatre in Helsinki was the first permanent theater in the city: inaugurated in 1860, it had burned down in 1863 and was reopened in 1866, when Raa-Winterhjelm was employed there. The theater became the first national stage in Finland, and Charlotta Raa-Winterhjelm became its lead actress within romantic tragedy between 1866 and 1872.

In 1866, she married her colleague, the actor Fritiof Raa (1840-1872).

== Reforms ==
In parallel, Charlotta Raa-Winterhjelm also founded her own Swedish language theater company in 1866. In 1868, the first theater dramatic school in Finland was founded in connection to the theater, and Charlotta Raa-Winterhjelm was made its instructor. As a drama teacher, she worked to introduce the Finnish language on stage. Finland, at that time a Russian province, had been a Swedish province until 1809, and the language spoken on the theater stages in Finland was not Finnish but the Swedish language, which was the second language in Finland and the language of the upper classes: most actors in Finland at the time were from Sweden, or from the Swedish speaking minority in Finland.

During this time, Finland was a part of Russia. Under Russian rule, a wave of nationalism swept over Finland to preserve the Finnish cultural identity and independence and escape a complete incorporation with Russia, and her initiative was a part of this cultural wave. Despite being a Swede herself, she felt that Finland should have a theater stage in the Finnish language. The Russian authorities reacted to her initiative by closing down the drama school in 1869. As a response of protest, Raa-Winterhjelm pronounced her lines in the Finnish language in the next play she participated; Lea by Aleksis Kivi, which made her historical as the first actor to have pronounced her lines in the Finnish language on a public theater in Finland. She repeated her act by being the first actress to play Ofelia and lady Macbeth in the Finnish language.

In 1872, Charlotta Raa-Winterhjelm formed the Finnish language theater company. This was however opposed by the Russian authorities, who banned her from accepting assignments in the Finnish language, and the same year, she left with a travelling theater company to perform in Oslo in Norway.

== Later career ==
In 1874, she married the Norwegian writer and journalist Kristian Winterhjelm. At this point, she took a new first name, Hedvig, thereby becoming known as Hedvig Raa-Winterhjelm. Her second spouse was an alcoholic who forbade her to accept long-term assignments, and she continued her career as a guest artist. Under that title, she toured Sweden, Norway, Finland and Denmark.

She came to be particularly famed as an Ibsen-interpreter. She toured Norway in 1876–1878, and in 1883, she toured as Mrs Alving in Ibsens Ghosts (play) in Helsingborg, Copenhagen, Stockholm and Oslo.

Hedvig Raa-Winterhjelm was also active as a translator of plays. She also tutored as a drama teacher, both as a private teacher and at schools. She was engaged as a drama teacher at the Högre lärarinneseminariet in Stockholm, where she tutored until 1906.

== Sources ==
- Österberg, Carin et al., Svenska kvinnor: föregångare, nyskapare (Swedish women:Predecessors, pioneers) Lund: Signum 1990. (ISBN 91-87896-03-6)
- 301-302 (Nordisk familjebok / Uggleupplagan. 8. Feiss - Fruktmögel) at runeberg.org
- Georg Nordensvan : Svensk teater och svenska skådespelare från Gustav III till våra dagar. Andra bandet 1842-1918 (in Swedish)("Swedish Theatre and Swedish actors from the days of Gustav III to our days. Second book 1842-1918")
