= Mathilda Gelhaar =

Swedish opera singer (1814–1889)

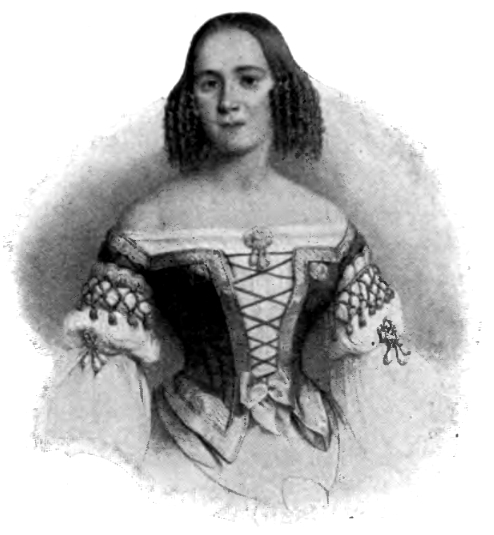
Mathilda Gelhaar

Mathilda Fredrika Gelhaar (née Ficker; 3 September 1814 – 24 April 1889) was a Swedish opera singer. She was also appointed official singer of the royal court.

== Early life ==
Mathilda Gelhaar was born in Stockholm, the younger daughter of Christian Fredrik Ficker, a musician at the Kungliga Hovkapellet, and Johanna Charlotta Widerberg. She was the sister of the actress Charlotta Almlöf, granddaughter of the actor Andreas Widerberg and niece of the opera primadonna Henriette Widerberg.

== Education ==
She was enrolled as a student at the Royal Dramatic Training Academy with her sister in 1828, where Mathilda was trained as a singer and Charlotta as an actor. She made her debut at the Royal Swedish Opera in 1829, and was engaged at the royal opera in 1834-58.

== Career ==
Mathilda Gelhaar was referred to as one of the most noted singers of the Swedish Opera, particularly in the 1840s and 1850s. She was described as a skillful coloratura soprano. One of her most famed performances was a duet with Jenny Lind. She retired in 1858.

Mathilda Gelhaar was made Hovsångare in 1837.

== Personal life ==
In 1836, she married Fredrik Gelhaar, musician at Kungliga Hovkapellet. She was the mother of the opera singer Wilhelmina Gelhaar.
