= Abraham de Broen =

Swedish actor, stage manager and director

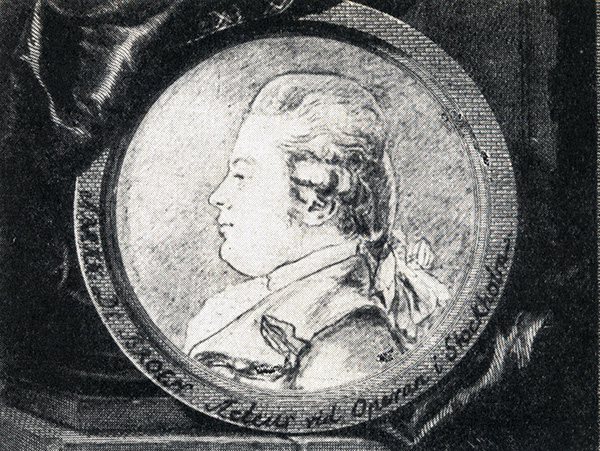
- Born: 1759
- Died: 4 April 1804 (aged 44–45)

Abraham de Broen (1759–1804) was a Swedish actor, stage manager and director.

== Biography ==
Abraham Isaaksson De Broen belonged to the elite of the pioneer generation actors of the Royal Dramatic Theatre. He was also the founder and first director of the Djurgårdsteatern. He was a very popular character actor and mainly played elder male roles in so-called burgher plays, often tragedies. In 1781, he was employed at the theater at Bollhuset and was later one of the leading actors at the Royal Dramatic Theatre.

In 1780, he was married to Maria Elisabet de Broen (1756-1809) and was the father of Isaac de Broen (1783-1814) and Debora Aurora de Broen (1790-1862). In 1801, De Broen was granted permission to found the Djurgårdsteatern and serve as its director. Abraham De Broen died on April 4, 1804, at Linköping in Östergötland County. After his death, the theater was managed first by his widow and then by their son, actor Isaac de Broen. After Isaac de Broen died in 1814, the theatre was taken over by his widow, Kristina Margareta Cederberg (1786-1858) and after that by his brother-in-law, actor Karl Wildner (1774-1844), who was married to Debora Aurora de Broen.

== Other sources ==
- Nordensvan, Georg, Svensk teater och svenska skådespelare från Gustav III till våra dagar. Förra delen, 1772-1842, Bonnier, Stockholm, 1917
