= Schmidt–Väisälä camera =

Type of astronomical telescope

The Schmidt–Väisälä camera is a type of astronomical telescope intended for wide-field (5 to 10 degrees of arc) photographic work. It was designed by Finnish physicist Yrjö Väisälä.

== Invention and design ==
Professor Väisälä originally designed an "astronomical camera" similar to Bernhard Schmidt's Schmidt camera, but the design was unpublished. Väisälä did mention it in lecture notes in 1924 with a footnote: "problematic spherical focal plane". Once Väisälä saw Schmidt's publication, he promptly went ahead and solved the field-flattening problem in Schmidt's design by placing a doubly convex lens slightly in front of the film holder. This resulting system is known as a Schmidt–Väisälä camera or sometimes as Väisälä camera.

This flat-field correction is not perfect, as images suffer from chromatic aberration with different colors ending up at slightly different places. However the approach has attracted interest for modern electronic image sensors with a flat focal plane which cannot be forced into spherical surface shape, nor even manufactured as such.

Learning that he lost the inventor status motivated Väisälä to publish his "less than perfect" designs.

Professor Väisälä not only designed the new optics, but also built several implementations of the design after Schmidt's publication.

His two first efforts were experiments to learn how to make the correcting meniscus (a 4th degree polynomial surface).

The third one he built was the Väisälä 500/1031 camera described below, that has been used to find 807 minor planets and 7 comets.

== The Väisälä 500/600/1031 camera ==
This telescope, which saw its first light in 1934, has a corrector plate diameter of 500 mm, and a primary mirror focal length of 1031 mm. The spherical primary mirror diameter is 600 mm, and it is on a German-type equatorial mount. It uses a 120-mm diameter doubly convex field flatten lens 3 mm in front of the focal plane, which gives it a 6.7 degree diameter field of view on 120x120 mm film plates giving a scale of 200 arc-seconds per millimeter.

The guide telescopes are 180 mm diameter/2300 mm focal length and 80 mm diameter/1200 mm focal length refracting telescopes.

The telescope was used over some 20 years to find 807 minor planets and 7 comets. Indeed, at the time its productivity was similarly compared to the rest of the world's minor planet hunters, and even rivals computerized searches from the 1990s and 2000s. Its astronomical surveys, according to one story, may have been intended to detect Earth-impacting asteroids.

For this rather massive photographic survey work, Väisälä developed also a technique of taking two exposures on same plate some 2–3 hours apart and offsetting those images slightly. Any dot that did not have a "pair" was marked for follow-up photos. This method halved the film consumption compared to the method of "blink comparing", where plates get single exposures, and are compared by rapidly showing first and second exposures to human operator.

The telescope was originally installed at Iso-Heikkilä Observatory on the outskirts of the city of Turku, Finland. When the city grew, together with its lights, the telescope was moved in 1950s to a darker location at Kevola Observatory, some 35 km east of Turku. The new location is now property of and in care of Turun Ursa Astronomical Association, which is Finland's second oldest amateur astronomy society, and also founded by Väisälä.

This telescope is used rarely (in the 2000s) to take sky photos on 4x5 inch flat plastic film plates. Its guiding telescopes are used mostly to watch stars and planets – e.g. a Pluto-hunt every spring, for which the guider is barely big enough to allow the human eye to see it under good seeing conditions.

== See also ==
- List of telescope types
- Optical telescope
- Reflecting telescope
- Schmidt camera

== Bibliography ==
- Liisi Oterma: Recherches portant sur des télescopes pourvoud d'une lame correctrice, 1955. (doctoral dissertation)
- Yrjö Väisälä: Anastigmatisches Spiegelteleskop der Sternwarte der Universität Turku, Astr. Nachr. 254, 361, 1935.
- Yrjö Väisälä: Über Spiegelteleskope mit grossem Gesichtsfeld, Astr. Nach. 259, 197, 1936.
