= Gerda Wrede =

Finnish actress and speech therapist (1896–1967)

Wrede in 1955

Gerda Helena Wrede-Paischeff (26 November 1896 – 17 November 1967), better known as Gerda Wrede, was a Finnish actor and speech therapist.

Born in Piikkiö, Gerda Wrede attended the Swedish Theatre's acting school in Helsinki between 1914 and 1916. After finishing her training, she worked at the theatre as an actor until 1921, and then again from 1927 to 1928. In 1931, she became the acting director of the school, and was promoted to the position of rector in 1941, a position she held until 1966. For a period she was also the theatre's stage manager and from 1954 to 1959 she was its deputy director.

Wrede also worked as a director on several Shakespeare productions, including Hamlet, which the theatre performed at Kronborg Castle in Denmark in 1947. The following year, her production of Hamlet was performed as a guest performance at the Royal Swedish Opera in Stockholm, Sweden.

She was the aunt of the film and theatre director Caspar Wrede.

Wrede received the Pro Finlandia Medal in 1954.
