= Wilhelmina Gelhaar =

Swedish operatic soprano

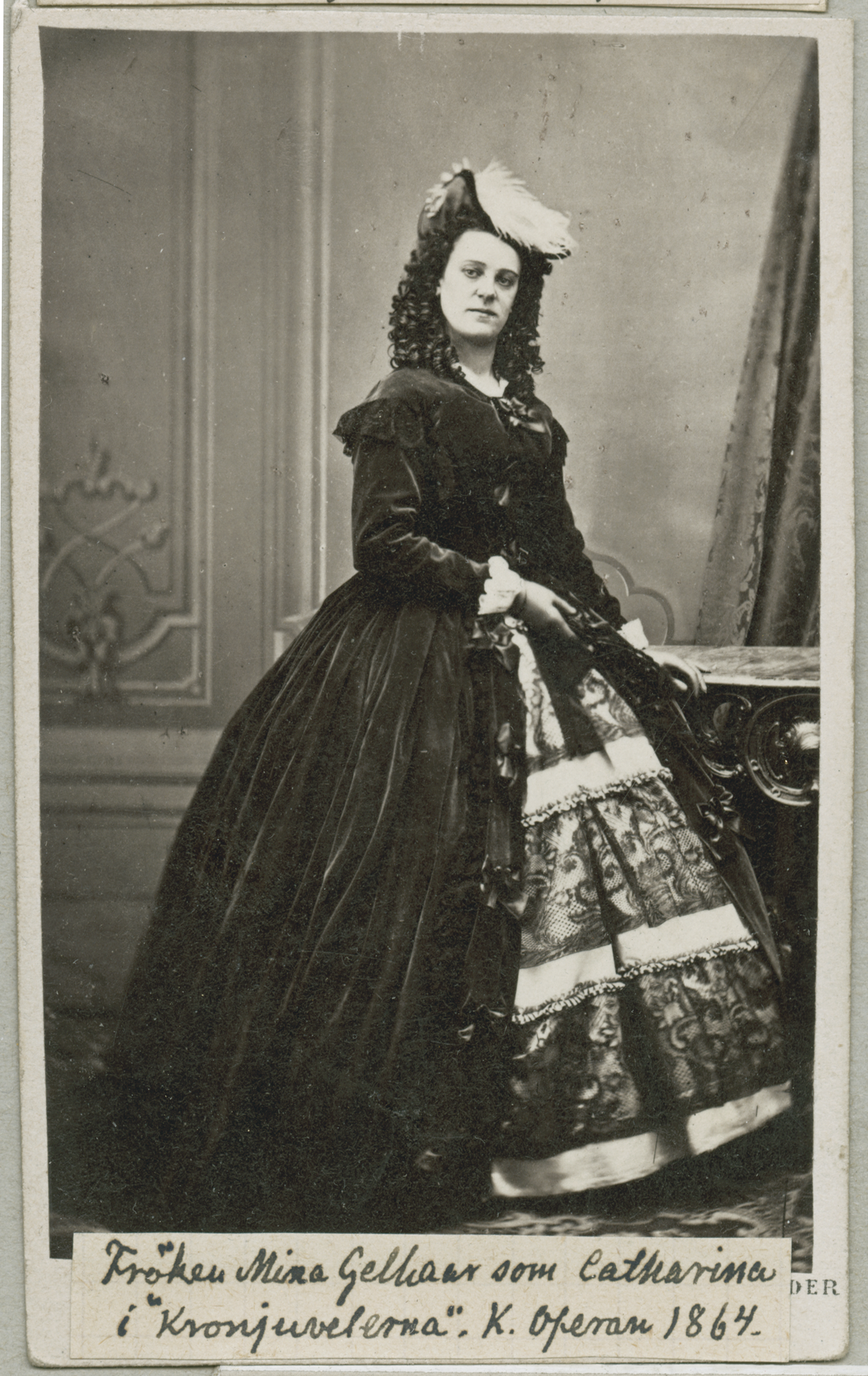
Wilhelmina Gelhaar

Wilhelmina Charlotta Gelhaar (1837–1923) was a Swedish operatic soprano who performed at the Royal Theatre in Stockholm from 1857 to 1866. She also gave concert performances. Thanks to her coloratura soprano roles, her good looks, her pleasant disposition and her competence as an actress, she was one of the most popular singers of her day.

== Biography ==
Born in Stockholm on 8 October 1837, Wilhelmina Gelhaar was the daughter of the oboist – Fredrik Gelhaar (1806–86) and the opera singer – Mathilda Fredrika Ficker (1814–89). In 1867, she married the director of the Royal Theatre – Eugène von Stedingk, who died in 1871. She later married the high court judge – August Wallensteen. Her son, Hans Ludvig von Stedingk, became director of the Royal Theatre while her daughter Gulli Gelhaar-Rudberg was also a soprano singer.

Her parents ensured that she received a musical education by sending her to the Royal Theatre school where she was taught by Julius Günther. Following her mother's footsteps, she made her stage début in the Royal Theatre school in 1858, as Susanna in The Marriage of Figaro and continued to perform until 1866. She played a wide variety of roles – including Rosina in The Barber of Seville, Zerlina in Don Giovanni, Pamina in The Magic Flute and Marguerite in Les Huguenots. She performed in the Swedish premières of Aimé Maillart's Les dragons de Villars as Rose Friquet in 1863 and in Fromental Halévy's La Juive in 1866 as Eudoxie.

Wilhelmina died in Stockholm on 17 February 1923.
