= Kevola Observatory =

Astronomical observatory in Finland

- Organization: Turun Ursa ry
- Observatory code: 064
- Location: Kevola, Paimio, Finland
- Coordinates: 60°25′12″N 22°45′54″E
- Established: 1963
- Website: www.ursa.fi/yhd/TurunUrsa/english.html

Telescopes
- unnamed: 50 cm Schmidt-Väisälä camera
- unnamed: 18 cm refractor
- unnamed: 8 cm refractor

The Kevola Observatory is located in Kevola in Paimio in South-Western Finland, some 35 km east from the city of Turku. The observatory is currently owned by Turun Ursa ry, a local astronomical association operating in Turku area. The buildings of the observatory include an observatory dome, a zenith observatory, and a house for recording observations.

Kevola Observatory has code 064 in the IAU/MPC observatory list. The main-belt asteroid 1540 Kevola was named after the observatory.

== History ==
The observatory was built in 1963 by Tähtitieteellis-optillinen seura (Astronomy-Optical Society) on a small hill on lands of the home farm of Hilkka Rantaseppä-Helenius. She worked at the time as an observer at Tuorla Observatory of University of Turku. The association was founded by Yrjö Väisälä, Liisi Oterma, Hilkka Rantaseppä-Helenius, and other astronomers working at University of Turku.

The association was terminated in 1983. In 1986 the observatory building was passed to Turun Ursa, also founded by Yrjö Väisälä. The land of the observatory was rented from a local farmer until 2002, when Turun Ursa received a grant from Viljo, Yrjö ja Kalle Väisälän rahasto (Viljo, Yrjö and Kalle Väisälä Fund) to purchase the land.

== Astronomical instruments ==
The observatory dome houses a 50 cm anastigmatic Schmidt-Väisälä camera, which was earlier located at Iso-Heikkilä Observatory, where it was used in an asteroid hunt to find 807 minor planets and 7 comets. The telescope has a 50 cm corrector menisculus and a 60 cm primary mirror with focal length of 1031 mm. It has a 6.7 degree field of view on 12x12 cm film plates, making it ideal for searching asteroids. Attached to the main telescope are two guide telescopes: an 18 cm and an 8 cm refractor.

The zenith tower originally housed a 250/5150 mm zenith telescope that was used to observe the movements of the axis of the earth. After the Tähtitieteellis-optillinen seura was ended, the telescope was moved to Tuorla Observatory. As the zenith tower does not have a dome but a roof that opens to the sides, and has therefore little use for normal observations, it remains unused.

== See also ==
- List of astronomical observatories
- List of observatory codes
- Tuorla Observatory
