= Tuorla Observatory =

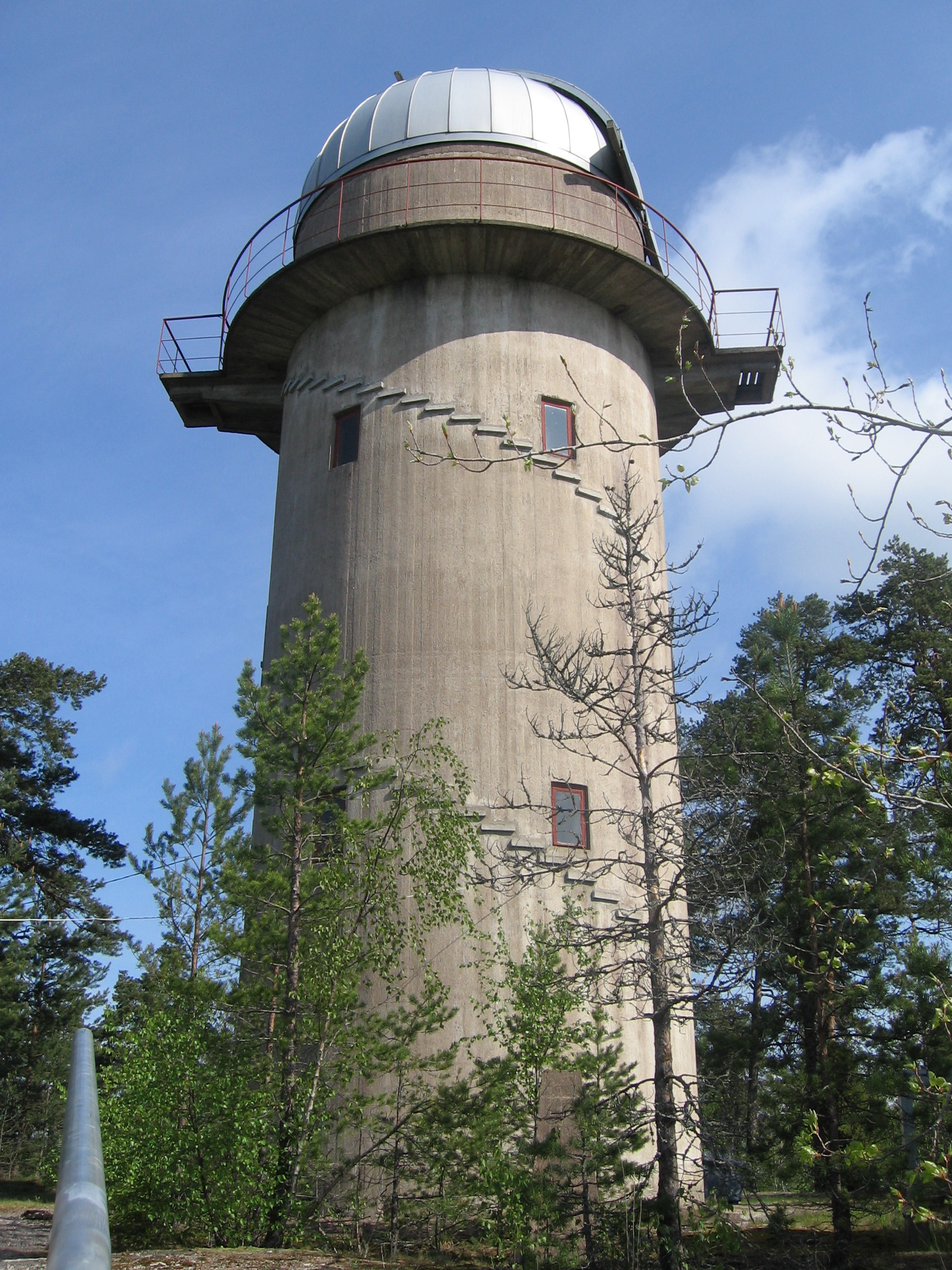
- Organization: University of Turku
- Observatory code: 63
- Location: Piikkiö, Finland
- Coordinates: 60°24′57″N 22°26′36″E
- Altitude: 60.6 metres (199 ft)
- Established: 1952
- Website: http://www.astro.utu.fi/

Telescopes
- unnamed: 1.0 meter reflector
- unnamed: 2.0 meter solar radio telescope
- unnamed: 0.7 meter Schmidt telescope
- unnamed: 0.6 meter reflector

Tuorla Observatory is the Department of Astronomy at the University of Turku, southwest Finland. It is the largest astronomical research institute in Finland. Together with the Space Research Laboratory at the Physics Department of the University of Turku, it forms the Väisälä Institute of Space Physics and Astronomy (VISPA).

== History ==
Tuorla Observatory was established on April 29, 1952 by professor Yrjö Väisälä. A new observatory was needed because the old Iso-Heikkilä Observatory close to the centre of Turku started suffering from heavy light pollution from the nearby city and especially the industrial areas to the south of the observatory. A new place was found in Tuorla, which is one of the small villages in (former) Piikkiö municipality. It is located about 12 kilometres from Turku towards Helsinki.

The first part of the observatory contained a main building and a 51 meter long tunnel for optical research. Due to the growing size of the department, new parts to it have been built in 1989 and 2002. Starting in 1974, the observatory was part of the Physics Department until 1991 when it became again an independent research institute of the university. In 2009 the observatory merged again with the physics department, and it is now one of the seven laboratories of the Department of Physics and Astronomy at University of Turku.

The observatory has several telescopes located around its main buildings and also uses international telescopes like the Nordic Optical Telescope. The one meter Dall-Kirkham reflector is the largest optical telescope in Finland.

Since October 2008, the Tuorla Planetarium has been operating next to the observatory.

== Research areas ==
The main area of research in Tuorla is active galactic nuclei; about half of the researchers are working on the topic. Other areas are dark matter, cosmology, astrodynamics, binary stars, solar neighborhood, solar physics and astrobiology. The optical laboratory (Opteon) produces high quality optics for telescopes. In particular, the main mirror of the ESA spacecraft Herschel Space Observatory was ground and polished at Tuorla.

== See also ==
- List of astronomical observatories
- Helsinki University Observatory
- Metsähovi Observatory
- Kevola Observatory
