= Isaac de Broen =

Swedish actor and theatre manager

- Born: 7 May 1783; City of Stockholm
- Died: 2 May 1814 (aged 30); City of Stockholm
- Spouse(s): Christina Margareta Cederberg
- Parent(s): Abraham de Broen

Isaac de Broen (1783–1814), was a Swedish stage actor and theatre manager.

He was the son of Abraham de Broen and Maria Elisabet de Broen and the brother of Debora Aurora de Broen. He married the actor and theatre director Christina Margareta Cederberg in 1804, and became the father of the actor Charlotta Deland and father-in-law of Pierre Deland.

After the death of his mother 1809, he took over the Djurgårdsteatern, at the time the only theatre allowed in the capital aside for the Royal Dramatic Theatre. He is remembered for his attempt to break the monopoly of the royal theatres in the capital. In 1810, he managed to acquire permission for him and his wife to managed a theatre within the city borders of the capital during the winter, in contrast to Djurgårdsteatern, which was officially a theater beyond the city borders which was only to be used during the summer, and he opened the Nya komiska teatern (New Comedy Theatre) in 1810. The project eventually failed, however.

Isaac de Broen died in 1814 and his theatre was taken over by his widow and after that by his brother-in-law.
