= Knut Almlöf =

Swedish actor (1829–1899)

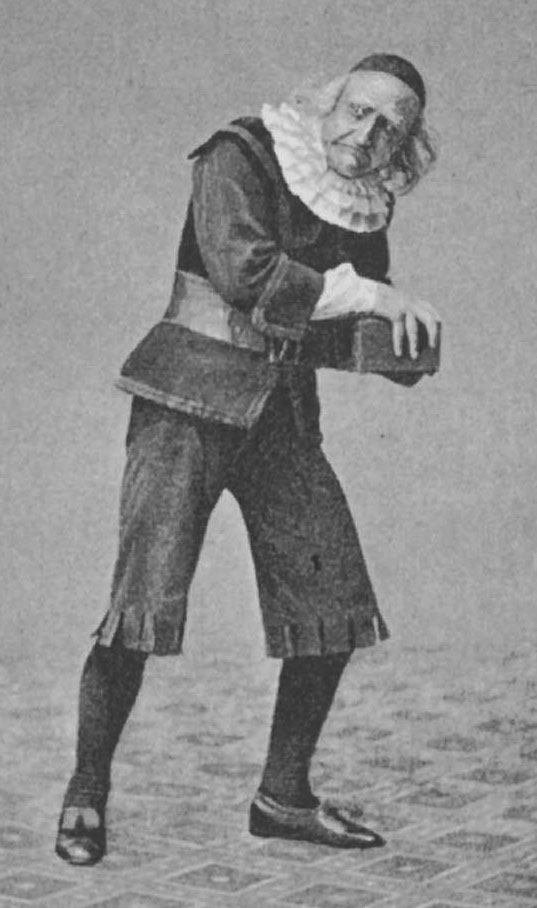
- Born: 9 February 1829; City of Stockholm
- Died: 3 January 1899 (aged 69); Kärnbo church parish
- Resting place: Norra begravningsplatsen
- Alma mater: Uppsala University
- Occupation: Actor
- Spouse(s): Betty Deland
- Parent(s): Nils Almlöf

Knut Almlöf (9 February 1829 Stockholm – 3 January 1899, Almnäs, Gripsholm), was a Swedish stage actor. He was an elite actors of the Royal Dramatic Theatre and one of the most famed actors of his time in Sweden.

== Life ==
Almlöf was the son of the actors Nils Almlöf and Brita Catharina Cederberg.

He had an early enthusiasm to become an actor. His father, one of his country's most famous actors, did not want him to become an actor, and sent him to be educated by a priest in Uppsala. His mother died when he was nine, and the year after, his father remarried the celebrated Charlotta Ficker of the Royal Dramatic Theatre. She encouraged Knut in his interest for the theatre, and after his graduation in 1848, they convinced his father about his preference.

In 1851, he joined the troupe of Pierre Deland, where he married his colleague Betty Deland. He was employed at the theatre Mindre teatern in Stockholm in 1861, and in the Royal Dramatic Theatre in 1863.

He was regarded as having a natural way of acting and was referred to as a genius in comedy.

In 1874–77, he was joint principal of the Royal Dramatic Training Academy with his wife. He took the death of his wife in 1882 very hard and retired from the theatre, but continued to act as a guest artist until 1897.
