= Charlotta Deland =

Swedish actress

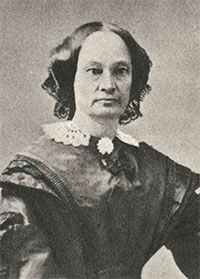
Hedvig Lovisa Charlotte Deland

Hedvig Lovisa Charlotta Deland (née de Broen; 7 February 1807 – 28 May 1864), was a Swedish stage actress.

Charlotta de Broen was born in Stockholm to an acting family and connected to many well-known figures within the theater world, which gave her valuable contacts during her own career. She was the daughter of the actors Isaac de Broen and Christina Margareta Cederberg, managers of the Djurgårdsteatern, and stepdaughter of the theatre director Christoffer Svanberg, who was the leader of his own travelling theatre company. She was also the niece of Carl Wildner, who took over the Djurgårdsteatern after her mother.

Charlotta Deland was educated in a fashionable girls' school. She made her debut in the travelling theatre company of her stepfather Christoffer Svanberg in 1831. She married her colleague Pierre Deland the same year, and in 1833, he took over the company, where she was active until 1861. She was a leading lady of the Deland theatre company, which was among the most successful in Sweden and Finland outside of the capital of Stockholm during most of its existence. The company regularly toured between the towns of Sweden (where theatres outside the capital consisted of travelling companies) as well as in Finland (where all theatres at the time consisted of travelling Swedish theatre companies), and also performed in the Djurgårdsteatern of Stockholm during the summer.

Charlotta Deland was described as an acknowledged and well respected actress and frequently performed main parts within both tragedy and comedy, but was given best critique for her roles as fashionable ladies within the popular genre of salon comedies. It was said of her:

"As an actress she was in possession of an unusually good judgement, a quick mind, the gentility of an accomplished lady and a pleasing figure, which altogheter made her an excellent acquisition to especially the finer comedy."

Her most acclaimed role was evidently the role of Ceasarine in Kotteriet ('Cottery') by Eugène Scribe.

In 1861, the theater company was dissolved and she, her husband and their daughter Betty Deland was engaged at the Royal Dramatic Theatre in Stockholm.

Deland died in Stockholm.
