= Charlotta Djurström =

Swedish actress

Charlotta Djurstrom
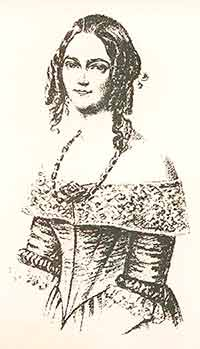
- Born: Hedvig Charlotta Hoffman; 14 May 1807; Kalmar, Sweden
- Died: 19 May 1877 (aged 70); Norrköping, Sweden
- Other name: Charlotta Hoffman
- Spouse: Erik Djurström

Hedvig Charlotta Djurström (née Hoffman; 14 May 1807 – 19 May 1877) was a Swedish stage actress. She was the managing director of the Djurström theater company in 1841-1846. She was one of the leading actresses of the countryside theater in Sweden and Finland during the first half of the 19th-century and referred to as the "Joan of Arc of the Countryside" after her most famous role.

== Life ==
Charlotta Djurström was born in Kalmar. She made her debut at the popular travelling theater company of Erik Stålberg, which became known as the Djurström Company when it was taken over by Erik Wilhelm Djurström (1787-1841) in 1827. She married director Djurström and took over the theater company as its managing director as a widow in 1841 until 1846. In 1846, she transferred the leadership and the ownership of the company to the leading actor Rudolf Forsberg and continued as a member of his theater company in 1846-48.

Until the late half of the 19th-century, only the biggest cities in Sweden and Finland had theaters with permanent staff, and numerous travelling theater companies toured between the smaller cities and towns of Sweden and Finland to perform in the theater buildings or temporary stages. The career of Charlotta Djurström illustrated the career of a countryside actress, and she belonged to the most famous of this category in her time.

Initially mostly used in soubrette and breeches part, she continued to play the heroine roles, in which she was to be most known. She is most known for her role as Jeanne d'Arc in Orleanska Jungfrun ('Maid of Lorriane') by Schiller in 1832, which was actually the Swedish premier of this part, a role for which she became so famed that became known under the sobriquet the "Joan of Arc of the Countryside". In this role she was called "fiery tragic", and her performances in this part where so famed that it reportedly attracted audience from the most remote villages to see her perform. She performed some operatic parts as well when the theater company offered them, but as she could not sing, the actual singing was made by Angelique Magito.

Djurström is noted to have been respected also among the upper class, which was not usual for a countryside actor. She was described as a great beauty but also as a plotting diva by her colleagues. Her fame, however, was always reserved for the countryside: when her theater company performed in the capital of Stockholm in 1841, was not given very good reviews and Charlotta Djurström was described as not much more but a averagely good actress.

She was described by a critic in retrospect:

"Mrs D. was both in manner of face and figure one of the most beautiful actresses of her time, owned a considerable talent and was the most popular actress of the provinces during her career. She is foremost known for her very praised interpretation of Maid of Lorraine by Schiller, a role she was the first in Sweden to perform. She also played Mary Stuart by Schiller with great success despite her tendency for convoluted pathos and stilted diction, and given much praise in the main roles of the romantic plays and drama staged by the company."

She was a member of the travelling theater companies of J. W. Weselius 1848—50, L. E. Elffors 1850—57, C. G. Hessler 1857—58, A. T. Schwartz 1858—59, and Thérèse Elfforss, W. T. Gille and Hessler. During the last years of her career, she was engaged at the Ladugårdsland theatre in Stockholm, which she was described as an ornament of the stage.

She was the mother of four children within marriage, notably the actresses Emilie Djurström and Wilhelmina Djurström, as well as an illegitimate son, the actor Hugo Wilhelm Eberhard Djurström (1834—1863). She retired in 1864 and spent her last years in Norrköping, where she died with her daughter Wilhelmina Djurström during a cholera epidemic.

== See also ==
- Margareta Seuerling
- Therese Elfforss
