= Carl Magnus Craelius =

Swedish singer and voice teacher (1773–1842)

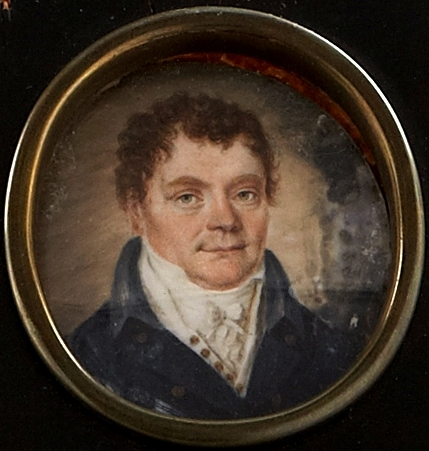
Carl Magnus Craelius painting

Carl Magnus Craelius (1773–1842), was a Swedish opera singer (tenor) and voice teacher. He was a member of the Royal Swedish Academy of Music (1822). He was engaged at the Royal Swedish Opera in 1795–1806. He is known as the mentor of several later famous singers, most notably Jenny Lind.
