= Nils Almlöf =

Swedish stage actor (1799–1875)

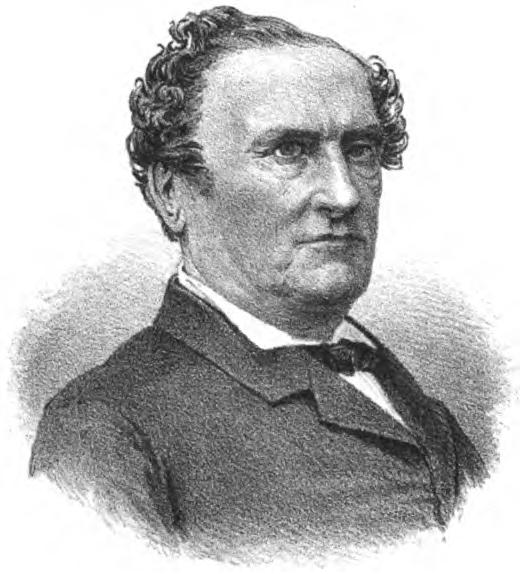
- Born: 24 March 1799; City of Stockholm
- Died: 27 February 1875 (aged 75); City of Stockholm
- Resting place: Norra begravningsplatsen
- Occupation: Actor
- Spouse(s): Charlotta Almlöf, Brita Catharina Cederberg

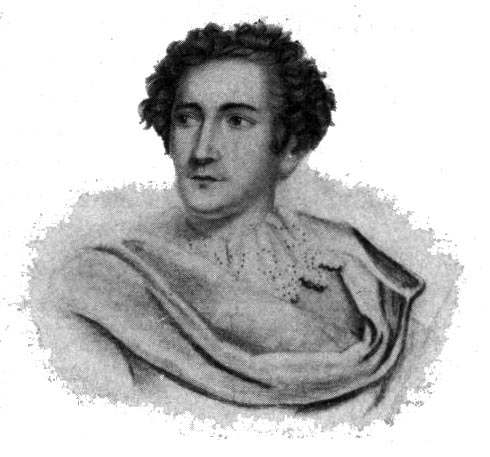
Nils Almlöf

Nils Vilhelm Almlöf (1799–1875) was a Swedish stage actor. He was one of the most famous Swedish actors of his time and referred to as "The Swedish Talma".

He was born to Nils Almlöf, a servant of the royal household, and Maria Lovisa Herbelin. He interrupted his medical studies to study singing under Carl Magnus Craelius of the Royal Swedish Opera in 1818, where he made his breakthrough as Leicester in Schiller's Mary Stuart opposite Charlotta Eriksson in 1821. He was a star at the Royal Dramatic Theatre for sixty years, where he was a notable male actor in tragedy. When he visited Paris in 1829, he was called the "Swedish Talma" by Mademoiselle Mars. In 1834 he had a wage of §1800, the highest paid by the theatre. He was teacher of declamation at the Royal Dramatic Training Academy 1834–40.

Almlöf and his second wife, Charlotte, as well as other actors, such as Elise Hwasser, were good friends with King Charles XV of Sweden, and were often invited to his balls during his reign as Crown Prince regent (1857–59).

He was first (1823) married to his colleague Catharina Cederberg (1794–1838), the sister of Christina Margareta Cederberg, who was engaged as a singer at the Royal Swedish Opera and who was most remembered as Papagena. In 1839 he married actor Charlotta Ficker, also a successful actress at the Royal Dramatic Theatre. His son with his first wife, Knut Almlöf, was also an actor.
