= Piikkiö =

- Former municipality
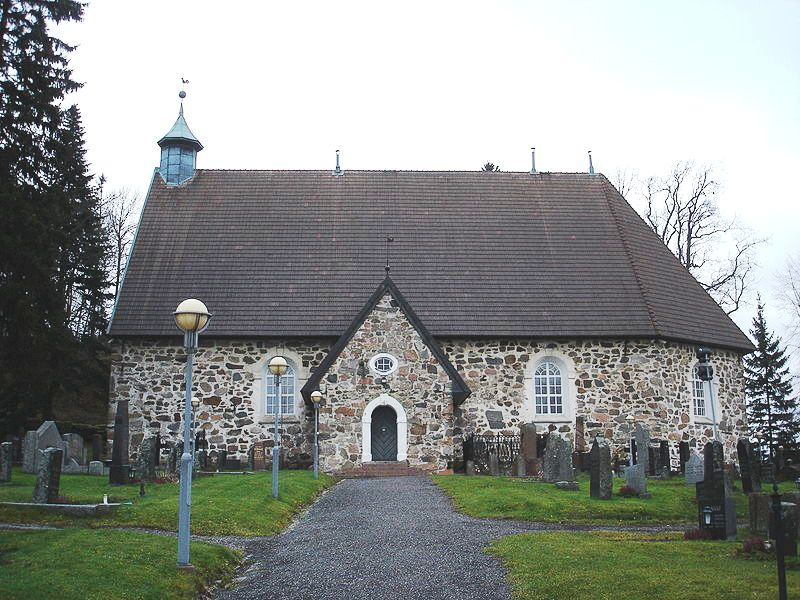
- Piikkiö Church

- Coat of arms

- Location of Piikkiö in Finland
- Interactive map of Piikkiö
- Location within Southwest Finland Location within Finland Location within Europe
- Coordinates: 60°25′30″N 022°31′00″E
- Country: Finland
- Province: Western Finland
- Region: Southwest Finland
- Sub-region: Turku
- Merged with Kaarina: 1 January 2009

Government
  - City manager: Jouko Mäkinen

Area
  - Total: 90.69 km^{2} (35.02 sq mi)
  - Land: 90.55 km^{2} (34.96 sq mi)
  - Water: 0.14 km^{2} (0.054 sq mi)
  - Rank: 400th

Population (2003)
  - Total: 6,695
  - Rank: 162nd
  - Density: 73.94/km^{2} (191.5/sq mi)
- +0.9% change
- Time zone: UTC+2 (EET)
  - Summer (DST): UTC+3 (EEST)
- Official languages: Finnish
- Urbanisation: 82.3%
- Unemployment rate: 7.9%
- Climate: Dfb
- Website: http://www.piikkio.fi/

Piikkiö (Finnish pronunciation: [ˈpiːkːiø]; Swedish: Pikis), is a former municipality of Finland. Piikkiö was consolidated with Kaarina on 1 January 2009.

It is located in the province of Western Finland and is part of the Southwest Finland region. The municipality had a population of 6,836 in December 2004 and covered an area of 90.69 km^{2} (excluding sea) of which 0.14 km^{2} is inland water in January 2008. The population density was 75.72 inhabitants per km^{2}.

The municipality was almost unilingually Finnish.

== Notable individuals ==
- Mikael Agricola, clergyman and de facto inventor of written Finnish
- Fredrika Bremer, Swedish writer and feminist
- Jenni Dahlman, former model and winner of the 2001 Miss Scandinavia contest
- Leena Lander, author
- Artturi Lehkonen, ice hockey player
- Mika Lipponen, footballer
- Sami Salo, ice hockey player
- Timo Salonen, rally driver and the 1985 world champion for Peugeot
- Yrjö Sirola, politician and writer
- Liisa Veijalainen, orienteer
- Gerda Wrede, actor and speech therapist
