= Swedish Theatre =

Venue in Helsinki, Finland

Swedish Theatre (Helsinki)
- Svenska Teatern
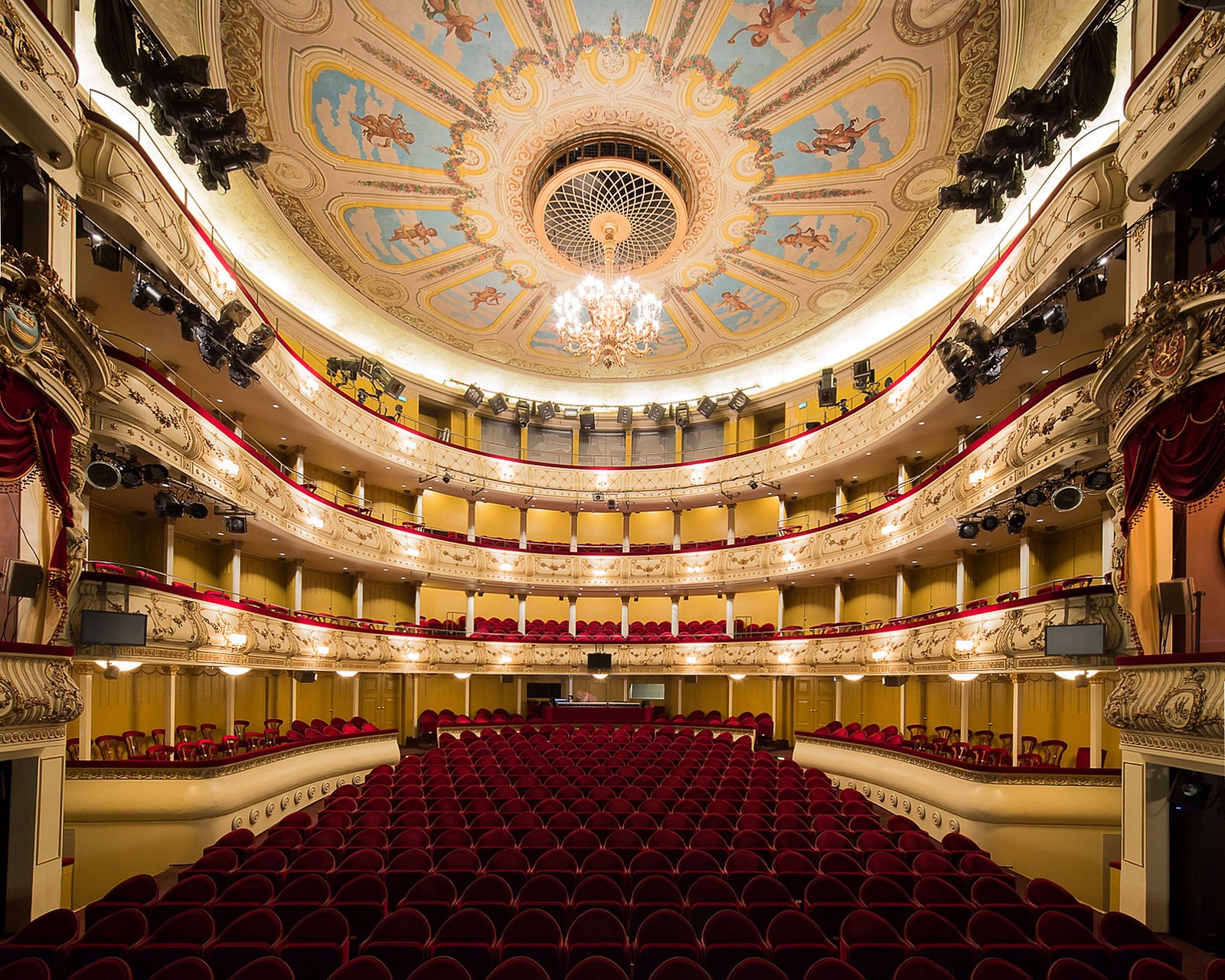
- Former names: Nya Teatern

General information
- Type: Theatre
- Location: Kaartinkaupunki, Helsinki, Finland, Pohjoisesplanadi 2, 00130 Helsinki
- Coordinates: 60°10′02″N 024°56′36″E
- Completed: 1860/1866/1935
- Opened: 1860

Design and construction
- Architects: G.T. von Chiewitz (1860); Nikolaj Benois (1866); Eero Saarinen, Jarl Eklund (1935)

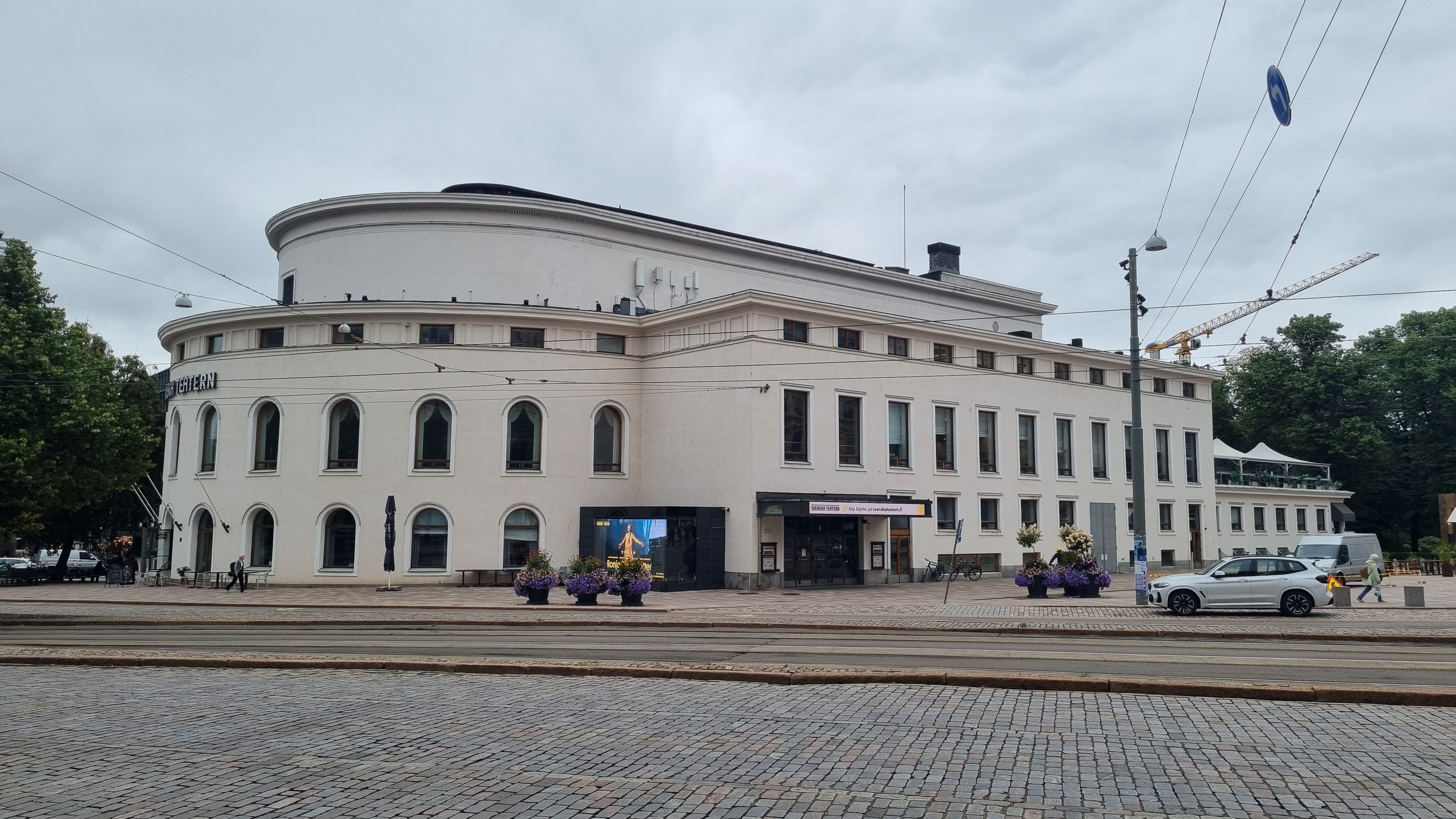
Svenska Teatern pictured from Mannerheimintie in September 2025

The Swedish Theatre (Swedish: Svenska Teatern) is a Swedish-language theatre in Helsinki, Finland, and is located at the Erottaja (Swedish: Skillnaden) square, at the end of Esplanadi (Swedish: Esplanaden). It was the first national stage of Finland.

== History ==
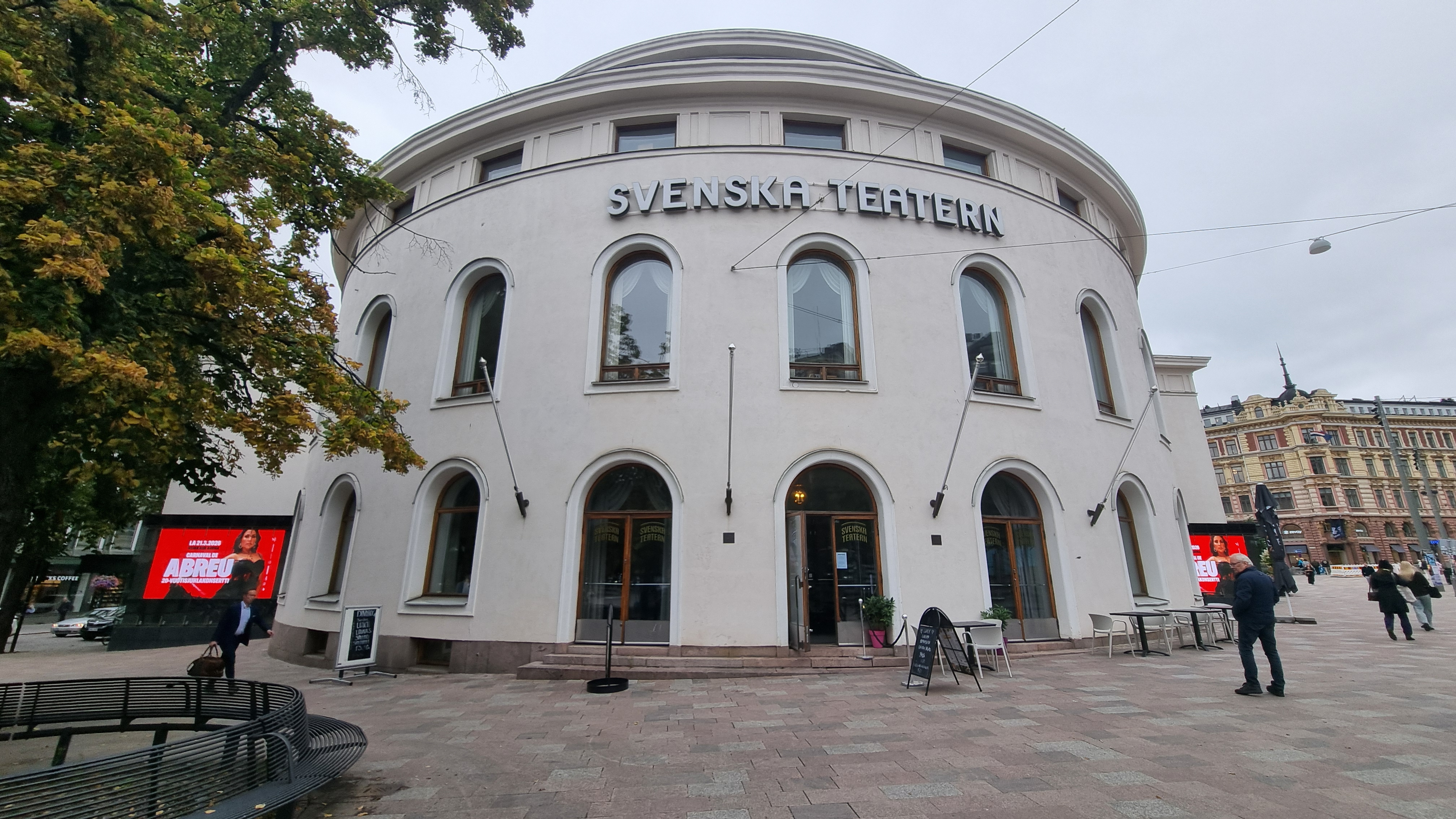
Svenska Teatern in September 2025

The first theatre in Helsinki, Engels Teater, was completed in 1827, during the era of the Grand Duchy of Finland. The wooden building designed by architect Carl Ludvig Engel was located in the corner of Mikaelsgatan and Esplanaden. At the time the theatre was opened it had no permanent actors and many of the actors who performed in the theatre during that time were en route to Saint Petersburg.

The theatre designed by Engel soon became too small as the interest in theatre grew rapidly among the citizens of Helsinki. The new theatre building was opened on 28 November 1860. The new building, which was designed by Georg Theodor von Chiewitz, was built on Skillnaden, on the same site as the current Svenska Teatern. The first play performed in the new theatre was Princessan av Cypern by Zacharias Topelius and Fredrik Pacius. The first actors of the theatre were from the group of Pierre Deland. The group performed in the theatre in 1860–1861. The language was initially Swedish, but Finnish language was soon launched on stage by the Swedish actress Hedvig Raa-Winterhjelm.

Only three years after the new theatre building was completed it was destroyed in a fire in 1863. The building was soon rebuilt, in the Neoclassical style, and the theatre re-opened its doors in 1866. This time the architect was Nicholas Benois from Russia. The theatre carried the name Nya Teatern (New Theatre) until the year 1887, when a Finnish theatre was opened in Helsinki. Since 1887 the name of the theatre has been Svenska Teatern.

The building of Svenska Teatern was renovated in 1935 by architects Eero Saarinen and Jarl Eklund. The richly decorated facade of the building was replaced with a new facade representing functionalism.

In the beginning of the 20th century, the directors of the theatre were mainly Swedish and many of the actors came from Sweden. In 1915, it was decided that theatre was to become a national stage for the Finland-Swedish theatre. In 1908, a new theatre school was founded by the theatre. Gerda Wrede served as its rector for over 20 years.

Many pieces of incidental music by Jean Sibelius had their premiere in the theatre, including the initial version of Finlandia in November 1899.

== See also ==
- Esplanadi
- Finnish National Theatre
- Alexander Theatre
- Finnish National Opera and Ballet
