= Pierre Deland =

American Model (1805–1862)

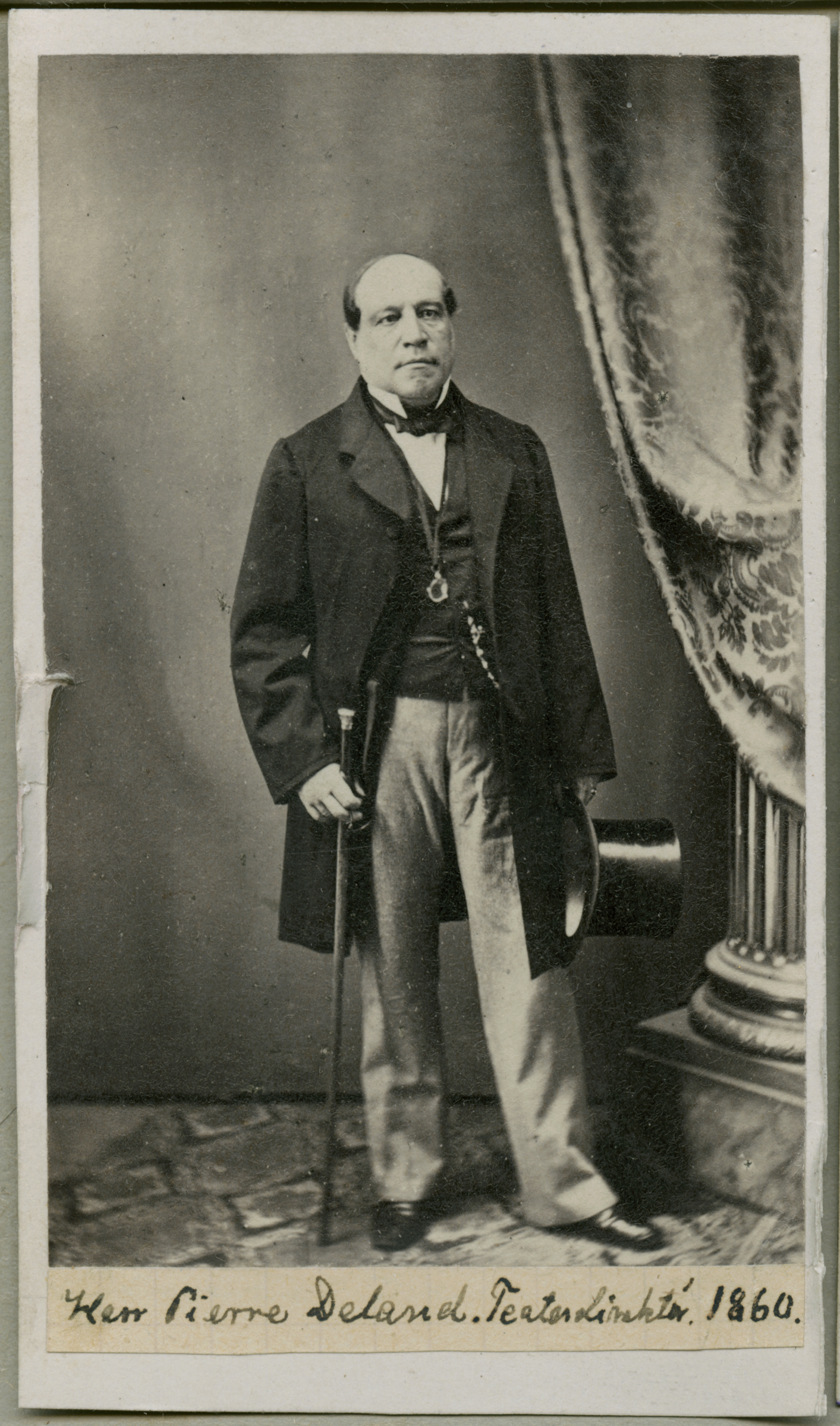
- Born: 13 December 1805; City of Stockholm
- Died: 13 November 1862 (aged 56); City of Stockholm
- Resting place: Norra begravningsplatsen
- Occupation: Actor, theater manager

Pierre Joseph Deland (13 December 1805 – 13 November 1862) was a Swedish stage actor and theatre director. He was the director of the Deland Theater Company in 1833–1861, a travelling theater famous in both Sweden and Finland, and as such an influential and well-known figure of the stage life of both countries in the mid-19th century. He was the founder of the Dramatiska och musikaliska artisternas pensionsförening ('Retirement Fund for Dramatic and Musical Artists') in 1857.

== Life ==
Pierre Deland was born to Jean Pierre Deland, violinist of the Hovkapellet, and Eva Magdalena Eklund. His paternal grandfather Louis Antoine Deland was from Luxembourg and hairdresser to the queen, Sophia Magdalena of Denmark. He was the nephew of the ballet dancer Louis Deland of the Royal Swedish Ballet, and the brother of the actors Lars Mauritz Deland and Fredrik Deland.

=== Career ===
Pierre Deland was active as an interpreter, a private teacher, a clerk and an officer of the Livgardet before entering the stage profession in 1825, when he was engaged at the travelling theater of Carl Gustaf Bonuvier. He continued to the travelling theater of Christoffer Svanberg, where his brothers Lars Mauritz Deland and Fredrik Deland where also employed.

In 1831, he married the actress Charlotta de Broen, stepdaughter of Christoffer Svanberg and daughter of Isaac de Broen and Christina Margareta Cederberg, directors of the Djurgårdsteatern, and in 1833, he took over the travelling theater company of his wife's stepfather Christoffer Svanberg (thereby making it the Deland theater company). From 1835, the Deland theater company regularly performed in the Djurgårdsteatern when they passed Stockholm in summer, and in Finland during the winters.

As director of the Deland travelling theatre, he became one of the most famous artists in both Sweden and Finland. The Deland theater company toured both Sweden and Finland and was one of the most significant of the travelling Swedish-language theater companies performing in the towns and small cities during the first half of the 19th century, when only the capital had theatres with permanent staff. This was also a period during which several of the small towns and cities erected their first proper theater buildings for the travelling companies to perform in, and the Deland company is known to have inaugurated several of them, such as the Uppsala theater (1840) and the Åmål theatre (1848). In Finland, they regularly performed in the Åbo Svenska Teater when they passed Åbo (Finnish: Turku) after its foundation in 1839. Perhaps most significantly, the Deland company inaugurated the Swedish Theatre in Helsinki, the Finnish national stage, upon its foundation in the 1860–61 season, and it was from among its members the first permanent staff of the Finnish national stage was hired.

As an actor, Pierre Deland was described as well educated and versatile. He instructed his students in the more realistic way of acting and speaking which was at that time an innovation. Deland was considered best in comedy, though only "finer comedy", and preferred to stage so-called French salon comedies, a popular genre of the time, and one in which he was well suited: according to critics, he was not suited for tragedy, nor for more burlesque forms of comedy. He was considered a capable actor but, however, not one who kept himself updated, and reportedly, his success and popularity in the countryside caused him to stagnate somewhat during the latter part of the career, as he had become unaccustomed to criticism. As a director, he was described as very strict, insisting not only on a high artistic standard from his actors and colleagues, but also upon a strict moral discipline of "virtue and order" from their private lives as well, and he was therefore not very well liked as an employer, and described as cold and arrogant.

In the 1850s, the finances of the Deland company slowly deteriorated because Pierre Deland's choice of plays had become outdated and he was reportedly to unaccustomed to criticism to change it. After his daughter and son-in-law Betty Deland and Knut Almlöf had been engaged at the Royal Dramatic Theatre, Pierre Deland and his spouse accepted employment there in 1861.

=== Social work ===
In 1857, he founded and organized the first pension fund for actors in Sweden, the Dramatiska och musikaliska artisternas pensionsförening ('Retirement Fund for Dramatic and Musical Artists') for retired actors and other stage artists. His initiative was prompted by his experiences as a director, as the actors of that time where normally given insufficient salaries and the acting profession was very expensive in an era when actors had to, among other things, pay for their own costumes, causing a dejecting recklessness and a miserable retirement for the majority of actors. A comment is quoted about Deland chastising his actors for financial recklessness: "You may laugh, gentlemen, but remember the promissory note!"
