= Iso-Heikkilä Observatory =

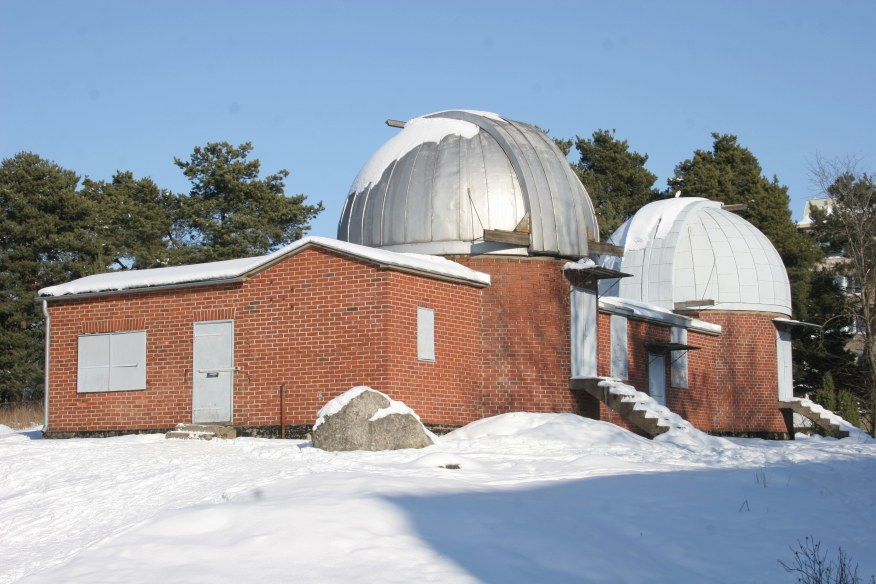
- Organization: Turun Ursa ry
- Observatory code: 062
- Location: Iso-Heikkilä, Turku, Finland
- Coordinates: 60.45205°N 22.2298°E
- Established: 1937
- Website: www.astro.utu.fi www.ursa.fi/yhd

Telescopes
- unnamed: 15 cm telescope
- unnamed: 13 cm telescope
- unnamed: 19 cm Schmidt-Väisälä camera

Iso-Heikkilä Observatory (Finnish: Iso-Heikkilän tähtitorni, Swedish: Storheikkilä observatorium) is an amateur astronomical observatory used by a local amateur astronomical association, Turun Ursa ry in the Iso-Heikkilä district of Turku, Finland.

Referred to as Turku Observatory (062) by the Minor Planet Center, it was previously operated by the University of Turku from 1937 to 1972, and is the observatory where several Finnish discoverers of minor planets made their observations.

== History ==
The observatory was originally owned by the department of astronomy of the University of Turku. It was built in 1935 and 1936, and technically designed by physics and astronomy professor Yrjö Väisälä. Väisälä's research team discovered a total of 807 minor planets and 7 comets at the observatory. Väisälä also contributed significantly to research in the areas of optics and surveying.

As the city expanded and a steel factory was built under a kilometer away from the observatory, the astronomy department of the university moved to Tuorla Observatory in the 1950s. In the 1960s, an apartment building area was built in Iso-Heikkilä, preventing any observations of low-sky objects in all directions except north. Iso-Heikkilä remained in the use of students for some time, until the university gave up its ownership completely in 1972. The observatory building and the site are now owned by the city of Turku.

The observatory is currently operated by Turun Ursa ry, an astronomical association founded by Yrjö Väisälä in 1928. The association arranged in Väisälä's time and continues to arrange stargazing events for the general public at the observatory. The members use the observatory, as well as the Kevola Observatory, for amateur astronomical observations.

== Instruments and facilities ==
The observatory has two 6-meter domes in the East-West direction. The main instruments of the association are located in the western dome: the 15 and 13 centimeter telescopes made by Yrjö Väisälä and a 19 cm Schmidt-Väisälä camera. In the past, the dome has housed a 50 centimeter wide-angle camera which is nowadays located in the Kevola Observatory – it was the telescope used to discover the aforementioned minor planets and comets.

== Standard baseline ==
In the forest further away from the observatory, about 200 metres (660 ft) to the northeast, is a concrete pillar used by Yrjö Väisälä in the 1940s in his baseline measurements. The Väisälä comparator has been used in important baseline measurements around the world.

Another pillar that remains today is located 500 metres (1,600 ft) to the southwest from the previous one, in a forest across the railway.

== See also ==
- List of astronomical observatories
