= Djurgårdsteatern =

Former theatre in Stockholm, Sweden

Coordinates: 59°19′39″N 18°05′57″E

- Interactive map of Djurgårdsteatern
- Address: Stockholm; Sweden

Construction
- Opened: 1801
- Closed: 1929
- Rebuilt: 1863
- Years active: 1801-1929

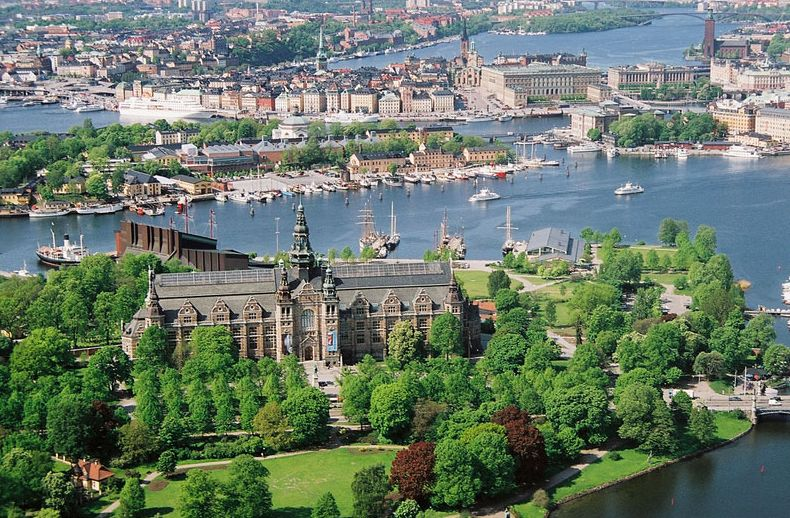
Nordic Museum at Djurgården, facing south-west with Skeppsholmen, Gamla stan and Södermalm in the background.

Djurgårdsteatern (Swedish for "Djurgården Theatre"), was an historical Swedish theatre, active at Djurgården in Stockholm between 1801 and 1929 (from 1863 in a new building).

It was the only theatre in Stockholm outside the royal theatres during the monopoly of the royal theatres between 1799 and 1842, and it also played an important part in abolishing this royal monopol. Until 1842, it was a "summer theatre", but later, it became an all-year theatre and an important one, called the "theatre of the people". It was described as a wood building with the same exterior of a barn, and was painted yellow.

== History ==
In 1795, Abraham de Broen (1759–1804), actor at the Royal Dramatic Theatre, asked for the permission to build and run a theatre, and a theatre-privilege were given to himself, his wife and their children for as long as they wished to use it. In 1798, a new theatre monopoly was stated, which banned all theatres except the royal ones inside the city border of Stockholm.

When the Djurgårdsteatern was opened in 1801, however, it was located on Djurgården, at the time an island outside the city itself, and furthermore, it was not what was counted as a "real theatre"; it was what was called a "summer theatre", active only in summers, and often called "The Summer stage". Thereby, it did not threaten the royal monopoly.

The staff at the theatre was described as "former footmen and maids", and it was often used as a stage for travelling theatre troupes passing through Stockholm, but many of the actors from the Royal Dramatic theatre and the Royal Swedish Opera made guest performances, making their débuts and started their careers here. The actors at Djurgårsteatern also toured on the country side. It was described as a smaller, more informal and less high pitched theatre. After the death of Abraham de Broen, it was managed by his widow Maria Elisabeth Grundt and his son, actor Isaac de Broen.

In the 1830s, Djurgårdsteatern entered a new age when it was the place of the abolishment of the royal theatre privilege in Stockholm. After the great theatre strike on the Royal Dramatic theatre by the actor couple Ulrik Torsslow and Sara Torsslow in 1834, the Torsslow couple left the royal theatre along with many other stars, who started to perform the Djurgårdsteatern in summer and in Kirsteinska huset, a concert house, in winter. The director of the Djurgården theatre, Isaac de Broen's brother-in-law Karl Wildner, married to Debora Aurora de Broen, then transferred the old theatre privilege of the de Broen-family on Torsslow and Pierre Deland, who worked on abolishing the old theatre regulation. In the 1841–1842 season, Torsslow stated, that he would start to play on Djurgårsteatern in the winters as well, no matter if he was stopped or not, and as the government did not wish to stop him, the old regulation was formally abolished in 1842. This quickly led to the establishment of several new theatres, such as Mindre teatern (or Nya teatern) in 1842, Södra teatern (1852) and Ladugårdslandsteatern (1856).

In 1863, Djurgårdsteatern burnt down, and the de Broen's privilege was abolished, but it was rebuilt again in 1866-67 and continued with its activity until it burnt down again in 1929.

== Directors ==
- 1801-1804: Abraham de Broen
- 1804-1809: Maria Elisabet de Broen (widow of Abraham)
- 1809-1814: Isaac de Broen (son of Maria Elisabet)
- 1814-1815: Christina Margareta Cederberg (widow of Isaac)
- 1815-1835: Karl Wildner (married to Isaac's sister Debora Aurora de Broen)
- 1835-1837: Pierre Deland (Isaac's son-in-law)
- 1835-1849: Ulrik Torsslow (1835-37 jointly with Deland)
- 1849-1861: Pierre Deland (second term)

== Sources ==
- Nordensvan, Georg, Svensk teater och svenska skådespelare från Gustav III till våra dagar. Förra delen, 1772–1842, Bonnier, Stockholm, 1917 ['Swedish theatre and Swedish actors from Gustav III to our days. First book 1772–1842'] (Swedish)
- "Svensk numismatisk tidskrift" (PDF) (in Swedish). Svenska numismatiska föreningen. 2007. p. 180.
