= Charlotta Almlöf =

Swedish actress (1813–1882)

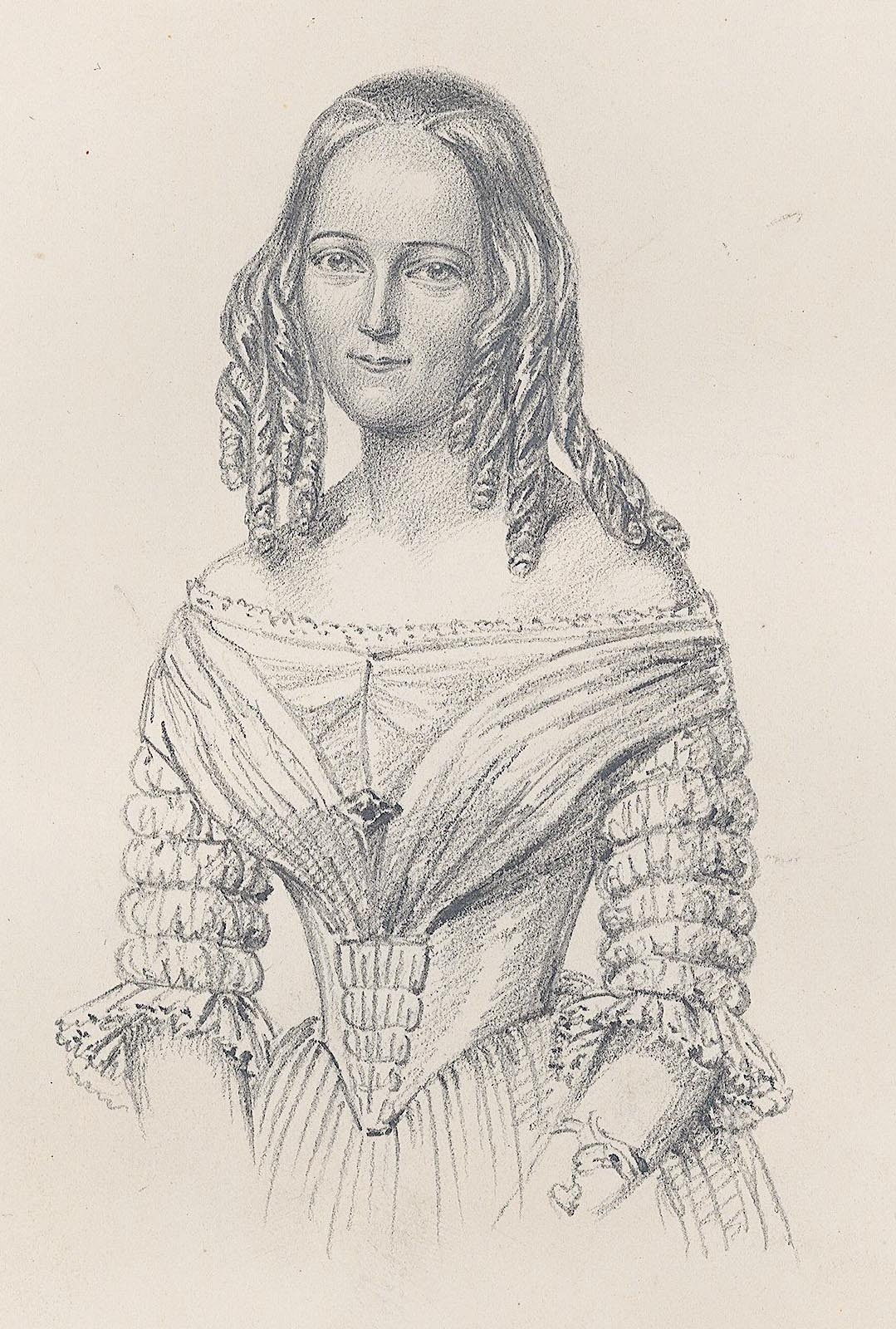
- Charlotta Almlöf by Maria Röhl
- Born: Anna Maria Franziska Ficker; June 16, 1813; Stockholm, Sweden
- Died: 1882 (aged 68–69); Stockholm
- Other name: Charlotta Ficker
- Spouse: Nils Almlöf

Anna Maria Franziska "Charlotta" Almlöf (née Ficker; June 16, 1813 – November 11, 1882) was a Swedish stage actress. She belonged to the star actresses of the Royal Dramatic Theatre.

== Life ==
Charlotta Almlöf was the elder daughter of Christian Fredrik Ficker, a musician at the Kungliga Hovkapellet, and Johanna Charlotta Widerberg, and the sister of the opera singer Mathilda Gelhaar.

=== Career ===
Charlotta Almlöf was enrolled at the Royal Dramatic Training Academy in 1830, made her debut at the Royal Dramatic Theatre on 23 September 1831, and was contracted as a premier actress there from 1834 to 1856. She married her mentor the actor Nils Almlöf in 1839, and became known under the name Almlöf.

Almlöf was described as beautiful and graceful and became popular in the role of coquettish girls and flirtatious ladies within the fashionable genre of French salon comedies, and to some extent seen as the successor of Charlotta Eriksson. She was very popular among the audience, which made her a star of the theater. In 1843, she was given a salary of 1333 riksdaler, which made her to a member of the elite of the theater staff. She was, however, never as popular with the critics, who often referred to her as pretty, decorative and graceful but much too mannered, artificial and shallow and considered her to be highly overestimated by the audience. In retrospect she was described:

"Mrs A. had a beautiful figure, much feeling and grace and a certain childlike naivety, which gave her performance something attractive and made her popular :with the audience. Gifted with a weak but very graceful voice, she was in the beginning of her career also used within opéra comique and vaudeville."
