= List of Spanish films of 1978 =

A list of films produced in Spain in 1978 (see 1978 in film).

== Films ==
Title	Director	Cast	Genre	Notes	Ref.
Al servicio de la mujer española (At the Service of Spanish Womanhood)	Jaime de Armiñán	Marilina Ross, Adolfo Marsillach, Mari Carrillo, Emilio Gutiérrez Caba			
¡Arriba Hazaña!	José María Gutiérrez Santos	Fernando Fernán-Gómez, Héctor Alterio, José Sacristán			
El sacerdote	Eloy de la Iglesia				
Ascensor	Tomás Muñoz		Short	Won the Golden Bear at Berlin	
Bilbao	Bigas Luna	Isabel Pisano	Erotic drama		
El diputado	Eloy de la Iglesia	José Sacristán	Gay drama, politics	A reflection of the Spanish transition to democracy times	
Un hombre llamado Flor de Otoño	Pedro Olea	Jose Sacristan, Paco Algora, Carmen Carbonell	Drama		
El huerto del francés (The Frenchman's Garden)	Jacinto Molina	María José Cantudo, Ágata Lys, Paul Naschy, José Calvo			
Ocana, an Intermittent Portrait	Ventura Pons			Screened at Cannes	
Los ojos vendados	Carlos Saura	Geraldine Chaplin, José Luis Gómez, Xabier Elorriaga, Lola Cardona, Carmen Maura	Drama	Entered into the 1978 Cannes Film Festival	
La palabras de Max	Emilio Martínez Lázaro	Héctor Alterio	Drama	Golden Bear winner	
The Remains from the Shipwreck	Ricardo Franco			Entered into the 1978 Cannes Film Festival	
Soldados	Alfonso Ungría	Ovidi Montllor, Pilar Bardem	Spanish Civil War	Hard to watch or find but huge reputation	
Tobi	Antonio Mercero	Lolo García	Comedy, Drama		
Las truchas	José Luis García Sánchez	Héctor Alterio, Mary Carrillo	Satire	Golden Bear winner	
La verdad sobre el caso Savolta	Antonio Drove	Charles Denner, Jose Luis Lopez Vazquez, Omero Antonutti	Drama		
Sonámbulos (Sleepwalkers)	Manuel Gutiérrez Aragón	Ana Belén, Norman Brisky, Mª Rosa Salgado, Lola Gaos, José Luis Gómez			
¿Qué hace una chica como tú en un lugar como este? (What's a Girl Like You Doing in a Place Like This?)	Fernando Colomo	Carmen Maura, Félix Rotaeta, Héctor Alterio			
