= Berlin International Film Festival =

Annual film festival in Germany

- Location: Berlin, Germany
- Founded: 6 June 1951; 75 years ago
- Awards: Golden Bear, Silver Bear
- Artistic director: Tricia Tuttle
- Website: www.berlinale.de/en/home.html

Current: 76th
- 77th 75th

The Berlin International Film Festival (German: Internationale Filmfestspiele Berlin), usually called the Berlinale (German pronunciation: [bɛʁliˈnaːlə]), is an annual film festival held in Berlin, Germany. Founded in 1951 and originally run in June, the festival has been held every February since 1978 and is one of Europe's "Big Three" film festivals alongside the Venice Film Festival held in Italy and the Cannes Film Festival held in France. Furthermore, it is one of the "Big Five", the most prestigious film festivals in the world. The festival regularly draws tens of thousands of visitors each year.

About 400 films are shown at multiple venues across Berlin, mostly in and around Potsdamer Platz. They are screened in nine sections across cinematic genres, with around twenty films competing for the festival's top awards in the Competition section. The major awards, called the Golden Bear and Silver Bears, are decided on by the international jury, chaired by an internationally recognisable cinema personality. This jury and other specialised Berlinale juries also give many other awards, and in addition there are other awards given by independent juries and organisations.

The European Film Market (EFM), a film trade fair held simultaneously to the Berlinale, is a major industry meeting for the international film circuit. The trade fair serves distributors, film buyers, producers, financiers and co-production agents. The Berlinale Talents, a week-long series of lectures and workshops, is a gathering of young filmmakers held in partnership with the festival.

== History ==
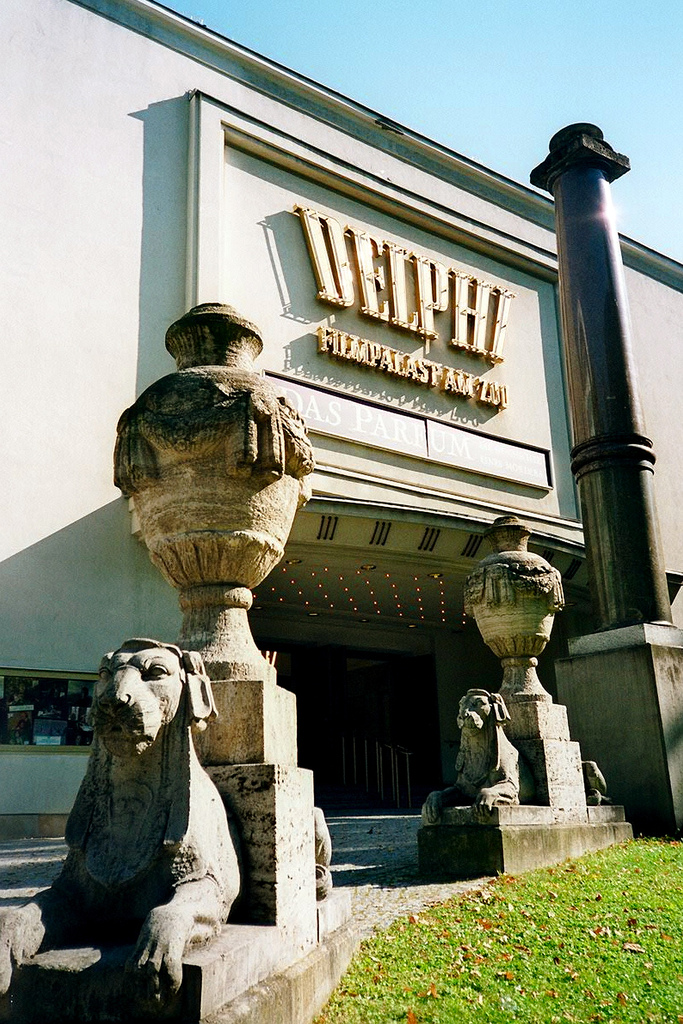
Delphi Filmpalast

=== First festival ===
During the peak of the Cold War in 1950, Oscar Martay, a film officer of the Information Service Branch of the American High Commissioner for Germany stationed in West Berlin, proposed the idea of a film festival in West Berlin. The proposal was put through a committee, which included members of the Senate of West Berlin and people from the West German film industry, on 9 October 1950. Through his efforts and influence, the American military administration was persuaded to assist and to give loans for the first years of the Berlin International Film Festival, which commenced in June 1951. Film historian Dr. Alfred Bauer was the festival's first director, a position he would hold until 1976.

Alfred Hitchcock's Rebecca opened the first festival at the Titania-Palast in Steglitz on 6 June 1951. The festival ran from 6 to 17 June, with Waldbühne being another festival venue.

The winners of the inaugural awards in 1951 were determined by a West German panel, and there were five winners of the Golden Bear, divided by categories and genres. Cinderella, which won the Golden Bear for a Music Film, also won the audience award.

=== Early years and awards ===
The FIAPF (Fédération Internationale des Associations de Producteurs de Films) banned the awarding of jury prizes at the festival, so between 1952 and 1955, the winners of the Golden Bear were determined by the audience members. In 1956, FIAPF formally accredited the festival and since then the Golden Bear has been awarded by an international jury.

Prior to the erection of the Berlin Wall in 1961, a selection of the films were also screened in East Berlin.

The fifth edition in 1955 saw the first (West) German film to win the Golden Bear, Robert Siodmak's Die Ratten.

In 1957, the Zoo Palast became the main venue for the festival, and remained so until the move to Potsdamer Platz in 2000 (see Venues below).

=== 1960s ===
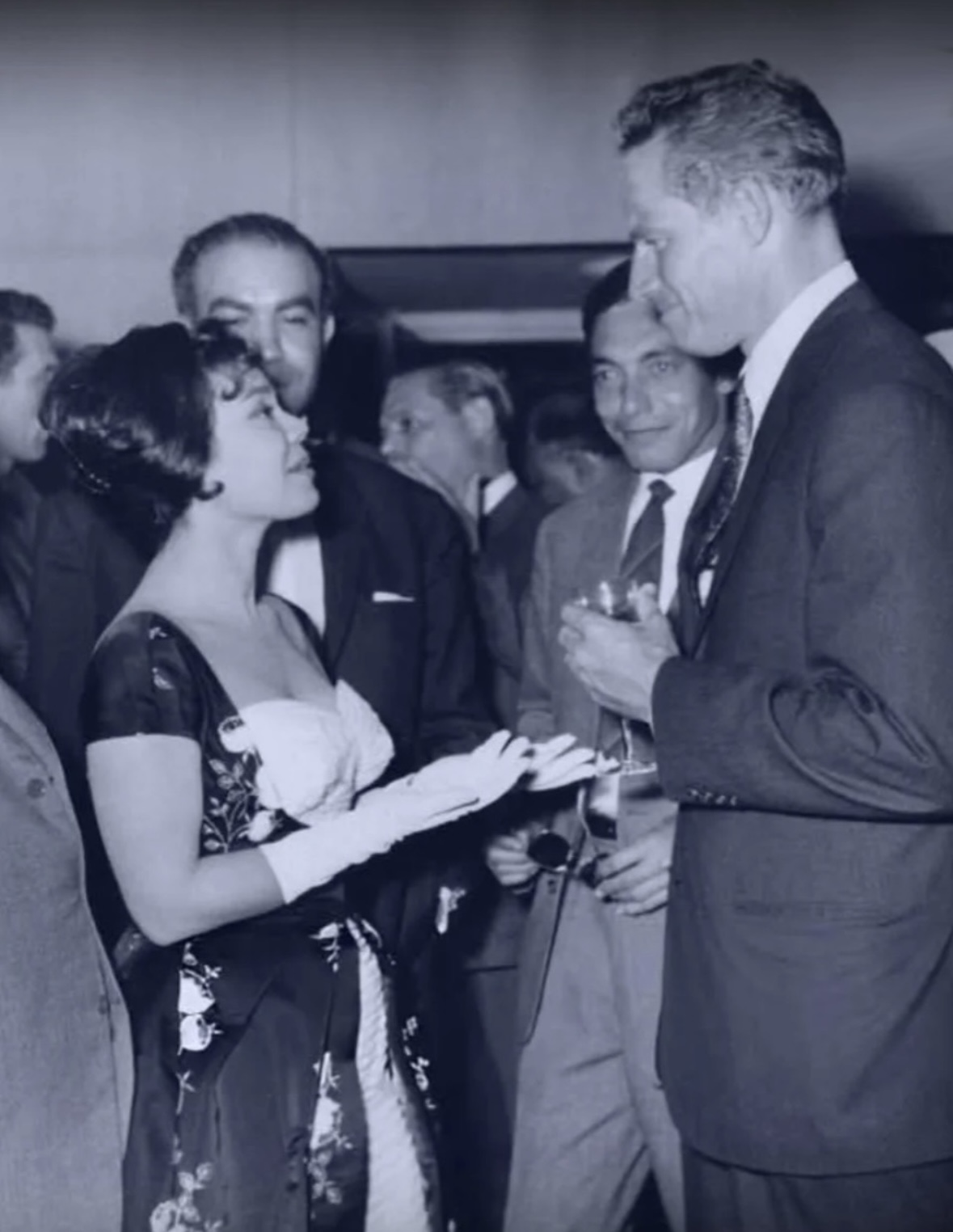
Charlton Heston speaking to Magda during the 11th Berlin International Film Festival, 1961

In 1963, two years after the Berlin Wall had been erected, a daily show of the Berlinale was shown on television in East Germany, with five films in competition broadcast.

Controversy arose in 1964 with the rejection by Bauer, on insistence from the church, of Vilgot Sjöman's second film, 491, from the competition.

Werner Herzog's first feature film, Lebenszeichen, premiered at the festival in 1968.

=== 1970s ===
The 20th edition of the festival in 1970 was cut short and awards not issued following controversy over the showing of Michael Verhoeven's anti-war film o.k.. The jury, headed by American film director George Stevens, decided after a 7–2 vote to remove the film from the competition, justifying their decision by citing a FIAPF guideline that said: "All film festivals should contribute to better understanding between nations". Stevens claimed that the film, which includes a gang rape of a Vietnamese woman by American soldiers during the Vietnam War, was anti-American. One jury member, Dušan Makavejev, protested against this measure, stood up for the film and supported Verhoeven and producer Rob Houwer. Verhoeven defended his film by stating in these terms: "I have not made an anti-American film... The biggest part of the American people today is against the war in Vietnam". Other directors taking part in the festival withdrew their films in protest, and the jury was accused of censorship and eventually disbanded, so no prizes were awarded and the competition was suspended.

This scandal had such a big effect that it was unclear if the festival would continue to take place the next year. The following year, the festival was re-formed and a new International Forum for New Cinema was created.

1975 saw the first East German film to be entered into the festival, Jacob the Liar.

At the premiere of In the Realm of the Senses in 1976, the film was confiscated in the projection room by West Berlin police and the "Forum" management criminally accused of the public screening a pornographic film.

Bauer was succeeded by film journalist Wolf Donner in 1976, who gave German films higher priority. After his first Berlinale in June 1977, Donner successfully negotiated the shift of the festival from the June to February (22 February – 5 March 1978), a change which has remained ever since.

That festival, the 28th edition, saw the jury award the Golden Bear to Spain for its contribution to the festival rather than a specific film. The three Spanish films which were screened at the festival and won it were short film Ascensor directed by Tomás Muñoz and feature films La palabras de Max by Emilio Martínez Lázaro and Las truchas by José Luis García Sánchez. The 1978 festival also saw the start of the European Film Market as well as a new section, "Cinema for People Six and up" (which later became "Kinderfilmfest").

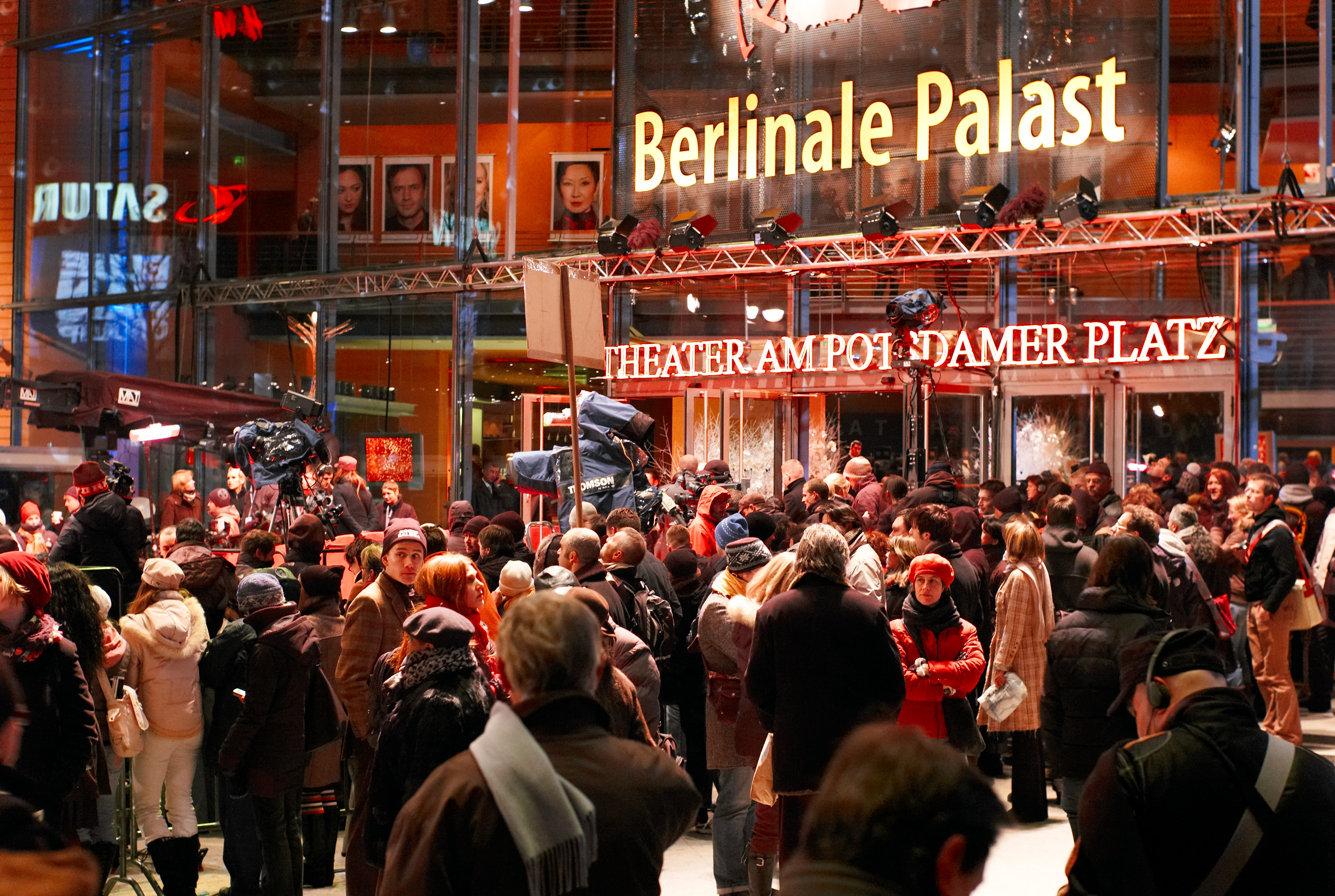
Berlinale Palast (aka Theater am Potsdamer Platz), main venue since 2000

Just before the 1979 festival, Donner announced that he was resigning. The festival also saw further controversy that year when the Soviet Union and other socialist states withdrew their films and delegates in protest at the selection of The Deer Hunter and their solidarity with "the heroic people of Vietnam".

=== 1980–2000 ===
Donner was followed by Moritz de Hadeln, who held the position from 1980 until director Dieter Kosslick took over in 2001.

In 1981, de Hadeln only nominated one (West) German film for the competition, Der Neger Erwin, and other West German producers and directors called for his resignation and proposed a boycott although no boycott took place.

In 1986, Gina Lollobrigida was invited to head the jury at the 36th Berlin International Film Festival, which awarded the Golden Bear to Reinhard Hauff's film Stammheim. She said the majority decision was "prefabricated", and opposed it.

=== 21st century ===
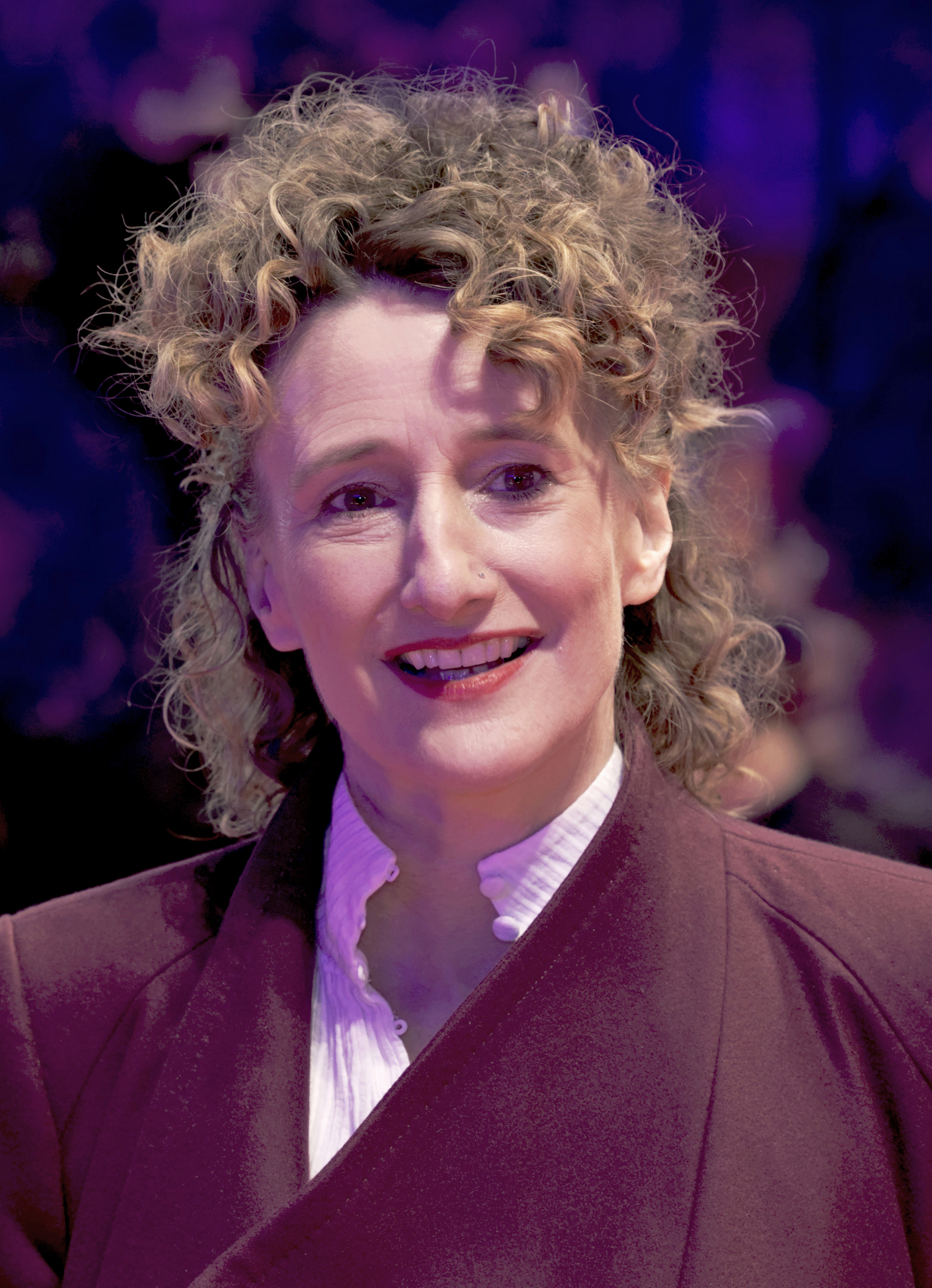
Tricia Tuttle, Artistic Director of Berlinale (2024)

Kosslick started making some changes to the festival, moving the emphasis from Hollywood in order to focus more on German and international cinema. He introduced various events to assist the development of emerging talent in German cinema. In 2010, for the 60th edition of the festival, Werner Herzog was appointed president of the jury. Also in that year, the city of Berlin unveiled its Boulevard of the Stars, with the first of 40 stars devoted to actors and filmmakers of the German-speaking film and TV industry. First to be honoured in the Boulevard was German-American actress Marlene Dietrich. In 2012 the 100th anniversary of the historic Studio Babelsberg was celebrated at the 62nd edition of the festival, with the screening of 10 classic films made at the studios.

A new Series section, devoted to longform television series, was introduced in 2015.

In June 2018, it was announced that Mariette Rissenbeek would serve as the new executive director alongside artistic director Carlo Chatrian. They assumed their posts after Kosslick's final edition in 2019. Rissenbeek became the first woman to lead the Berlinale.

A shortened 71st festival took place virtually in March 2021 due to the COVID-19 pandemic.

73rd Berlin International Film Festival held in February 2023, was the first completely in-person Berlinale since the 70th in 2020.

Tricia Tuttle took over as the new artistic director in April 2024; the 75th Berlinale 2025 was her first festival.

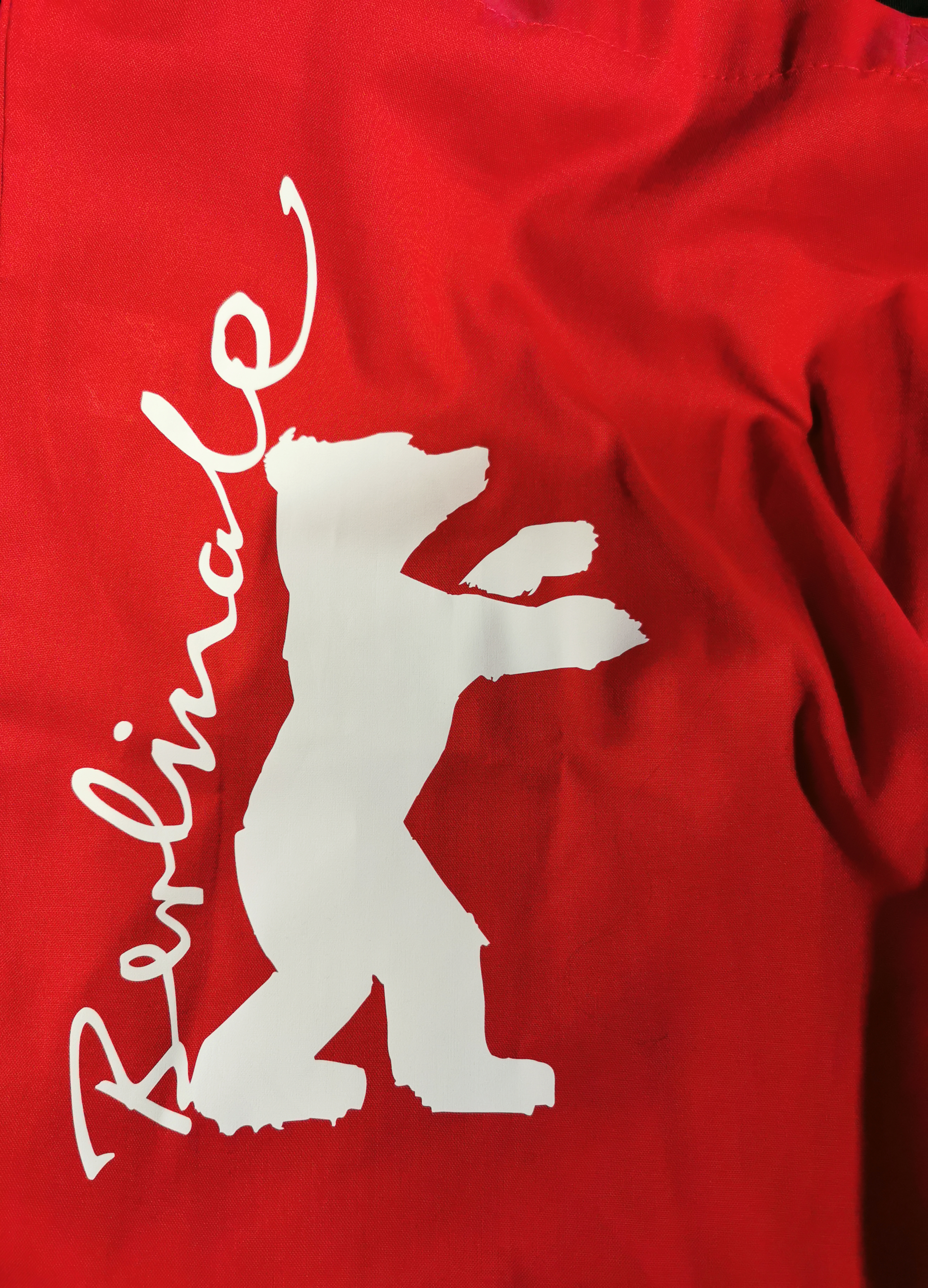
Berlinale's logo

== Description and governance ==
The Berlinale is considered one of the five major film festivals in the world, alongside Venice, Cannes, Sundance and Toronto, and is the largest based on attendance. As of 2020, around 325,000 tickets were sold, and nearly 16,000 film industry professionals from 130 countries attended the festival. It is held in Berlin. It attracts tens of thousands of visitors each year. For the 2022 event, still feeling the effects of the COVID-19 pandemic, 156,472 tickets were sold.

About 400 films are shown in several sections across cinematic genres, with around twenty films competing for the festival's top awards, the Golden Bear and Silver Bears.

In 2022, festival was receiving €10.3 million from the Federal Government Commissioner for Culture and the Media. There was consideration given by the federal government to help compensate for revenue lost and additional expenditure owing to the pandemic, with funds drawn from the Neustart Kultur programme.

Since 2019, Mariette Rissenbeek has been the festival's executive director; Carlo Chatrian is its artistic director. In September 2023, it was reported that artistic director Carlo Chatrian will relinquish his post after 2024 Berlinale. On 12 December 2023 it was announced by the German culture ministry that Tricia Tuttle, formerly director of the BFI London Film Festival, will be the sole director of the Berlinale from April 2024.

== Entries ==
The festival is open to films of every length and genre, but there is priority given to international and European premieres, and the films need to have been completed within the year preceding the festival. Submissions open in September of the preceding year.

== Festival programme ==
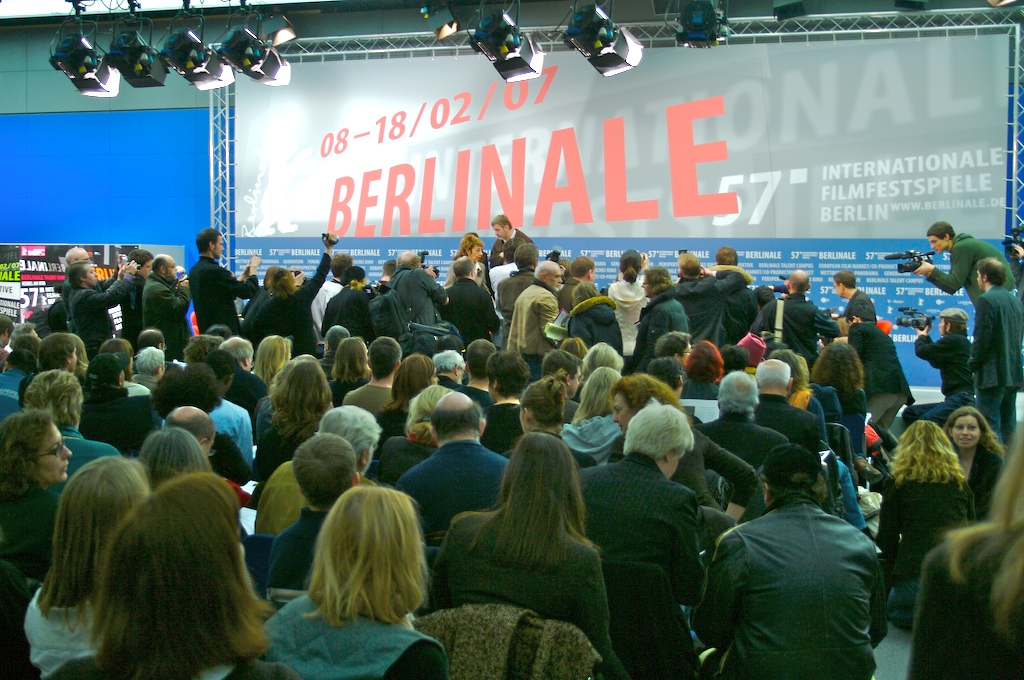
Conference after a screening

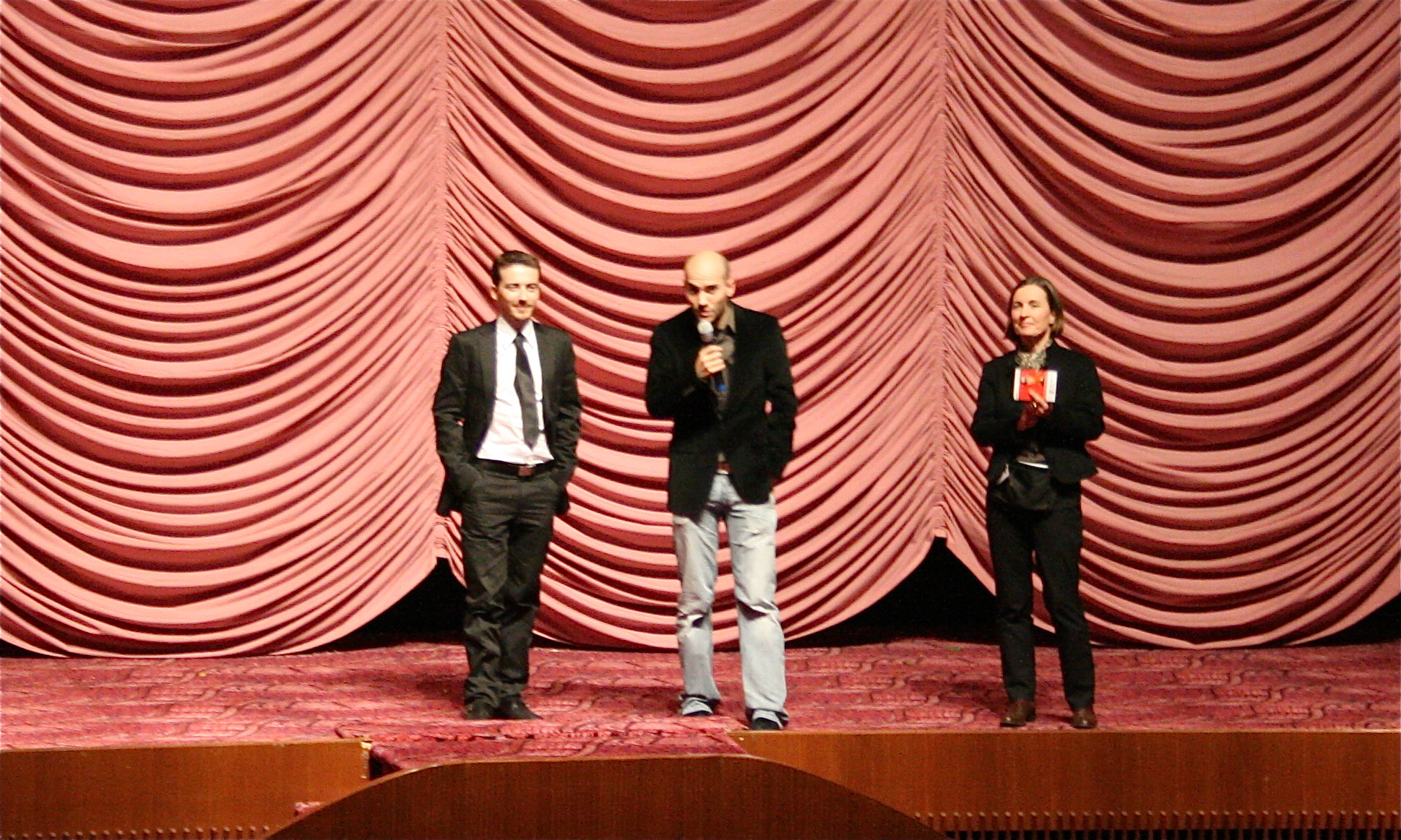
Víctor Clavijo and F. Javier Gutiérrez in discussion with audience, 2008

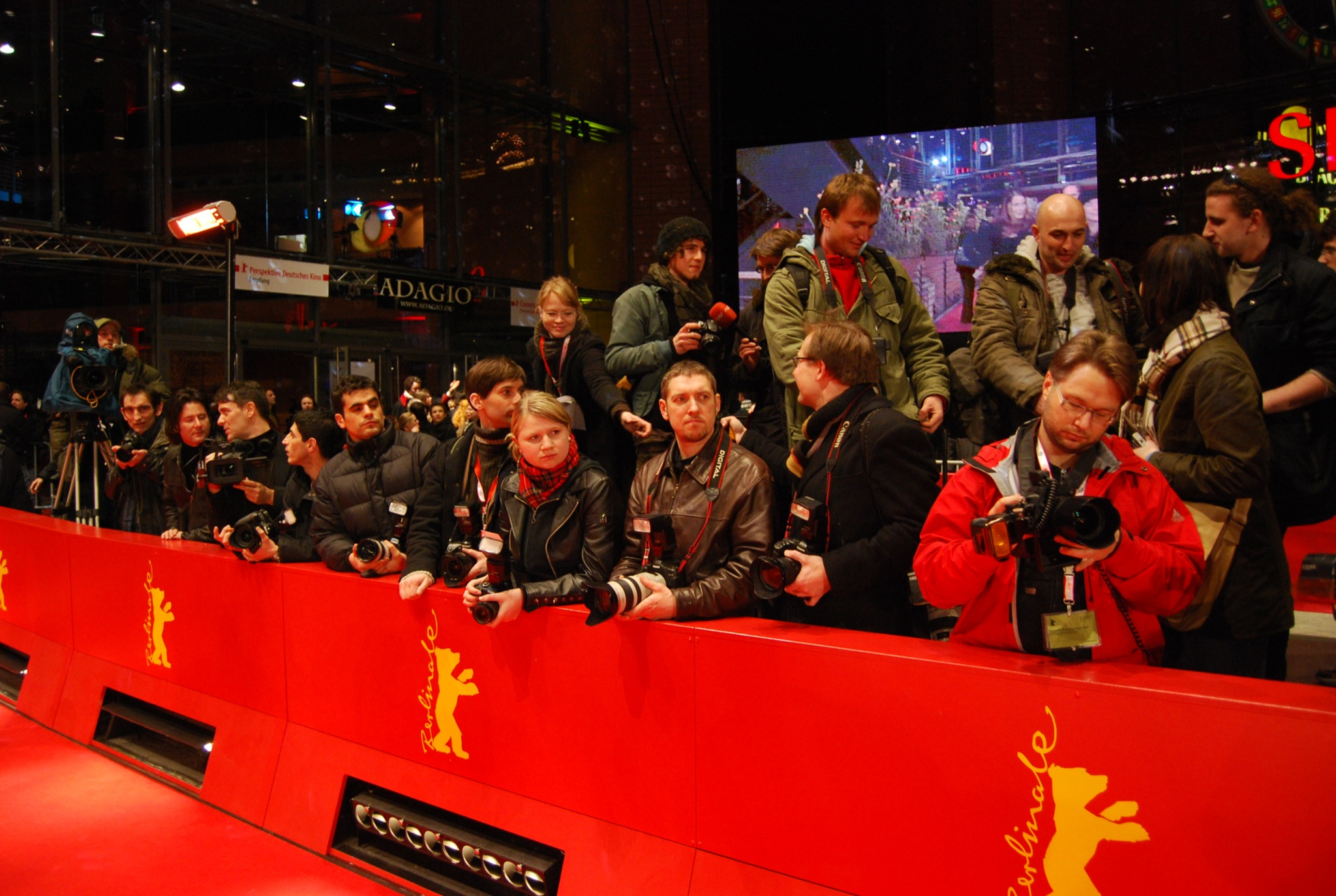
Journalists at BIFF in 2008

As of 2025 the festival is composed of eight different sections:

- Competition: feature-length films yet to be released outside their country of origin, which compete for several prizes, including the top Golden Bear for the best film and a series of Silver Bears for acting, writing and production
- Berlinale Special (a diverse selection of films, events and people) & Berlinale Series (for television series)
- Perspectives a juried competition for first feature films from international filmmakers
- Berlinale Shorts, for short films since 2007 a separate section; short films were honoured with Golden and Silver Bears from 1955, with a separate jury for shorts established in 2003
- Panorama: originally known as "Information show" screening innovative, mostly independent, films. In 1986 it was renamed "Panorama" showing films that "break with convention and tackle contemporary themes in a novel way, discover new talents or new cinematographic style." It is currently described as "explicitly queer, explicitly feminist, explicitly political"
- Forum & Forum Expanded: reflections on the medium of film; a selection of around 40 films, independently curated and organised by Arsenal Institute for Film and Video Art as part of the Berlinale, since 1971 Barbara Wurm, the author and curator, was appointed new head of Berlinale Forum on 7 March 2023 succeeding Cristina Nord, taking charge as of 1 August 2023.
- Generation: comprising Generation Kplus and Generation 14plus, two competition programmes screening international cinema exploring the worlds of children and teenagers; started in 1978 with a selection "Cinema for People Six and up"; then Kinderfilmfest ("Children's Film Festival"); expanded to include the 14plus competition in 2004; renamed Generation in 2007, with the two sections
- Retrospective, Berlinale Classics & Homage, established in 1977, curated by the Deutsche Kinemathek – Museum für Film und Fernsehen, and awarder of the Honorary Golden Bear for a lifetime's achievement in filmmaking

"Perspektive Deutsches Kino" (Perspectives on German Cinema) was created in 2002 by incoming director Dieter Kosslick with Alfred Holighaus. This was dropped from 2024 Berlinale due to budget cuts.

A section called "Culinary Cinema" had also been introduced by Kosslick in 2007, as well as a series called "NATIVe" (for indigenous filmmakers) in 2013; however, these were dropped after his departure in 2019.

A section titled Encounters which was designed to foster "daring works" initiated in 2020, running until it was replaced by Perspectives in 2025.

== Awards ==
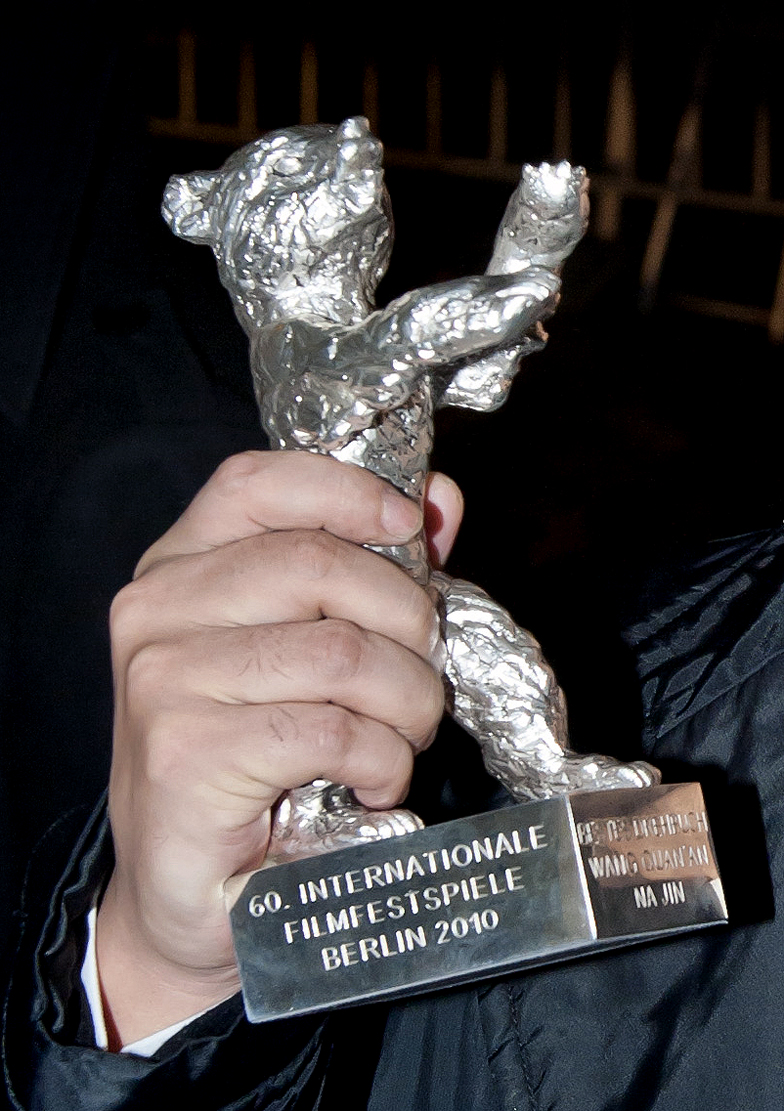
The Silver Bear statue

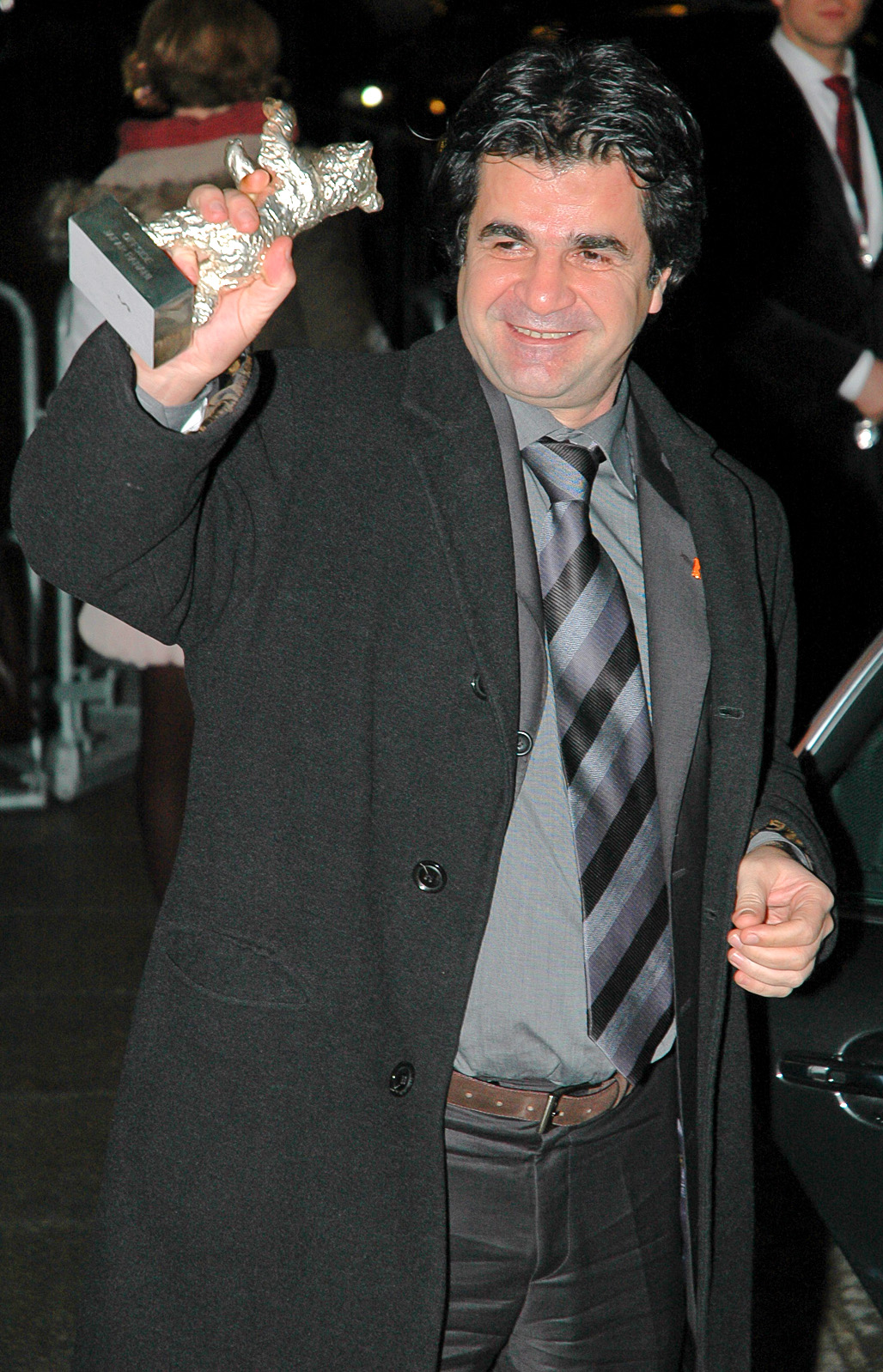
Jafar Panahi with Silver Bear, 2006

The Golden Bear (Goldener Bär) is the highest prize awarded for the best film at the Berlin International Film Festival. In its first year in 1951, it was awarded to the best film in each of five categories, by an all-German jury.

From 1952 to 1955, the Golden and Silver Bears were awarded by audience voting, as the FIAPF had determined after the first festival that only the Cannes and the Venice film festivals were allowed to appoint official juries. A Silver Bear (Silberner Bär) and a Bronze Berlin Bear, determined by audience vote, were also awarded from 1952 to 1955. After the FIAPF ruled to allow it, an official international jury determined the prizes from 1956 onwards, and in the same year a second Golden Bear was added, for best short film, as well as a second category of award, the Silver Bear, for individual achievements in acting or directing. In 1965, a runner-up prize to the Golden Bear was added.

The statuettes awarded as trophies are based on the Bär first created by sculptor Renée Sintenis (1888–1965) in 1932. The bear, based on the coat of arms of Berlin and depicting a bear standing on its hind legs with its arms raised, became popular in the 1930s, bringing wealth to Sintenis. Since the 3rd edition of the festival in 1953, replicas of the bear have been produced by the Noack Foundry.

=== International jury prizes ===
The main prizes in the festival are those awarded by the international jury since 1956, which today include the Golden Bear and various Silver Bears. In 1956, apart from the Golden Bear, there were also Silver Bears awarded by the new international feature film jury for best director, best actress, best actor, best outstanding single achievement, outstanding artistic contribution, and a Silver Bear International Prize.

As of 2022, the Golden Bear for Best Film is awarded to the producers of the best feature film.

As of 2022, the categories of Silver Bear awards are:

- Silver Bear Grand Jury Prize
- Silver Bear Jury Prize
- Silver Bear for Best Director
- Silver Bear for Best Leading Performance
- Silver Bear for Best Supporting Performance
- Silver Bear for Best Screenplay
- Silver Bear for Outstanding Artistic Contribution

=== Other Berlinale awards ===
The Honorary Golden Bear has been awarded for lifetime achievement since 1982, when it was awarded to James Stewart. It is presented to someone with an exceptional artistic career, and is given to the guest of honour of the Homage section which has been run since 1977 by the Berlinale and the Deutsche Kinemathek – Museum für Film und Fernsehen.

Awards for short films are awarded by a separate international short film jury consisting of three filmmakers and artists. As of 2022, the short film award are:

- Golden Bear for Best Short Film
- Silver Bear for Best Short Film
- Berlin Short Film Candidate for the European Film Awards

There are also awards given by separate juries or via other routes at the Berlinale. These include:

- The Berlinale Camera has been awarded since 1986, with the trophy modelled on a real camera, made with 128 parts, some movable. It is awarded to "personalities and institutions that have made a unique contribution to film", as a way for the festival to express its thanks to friends and supporters of the festival. Past winners include Isabella Rossellini, Michael Ballhaus, Claude Chabrol, Jodie Foster, Otto Sander, Karlheinz Böhm, Clint Eastwood, Gina Lollobrigida, Sydney Pollack, and Curt Siodmak.
- Crystal Bears (Gläserner Bär), Grand Prix and special prizes are awarded in the Generation section (grouped separately into Generation Kplus and Generation 14plus)
- GWFF Best First Feature Award (since 2006), worth 50,000 Euros, is funded by Gesellschaft zur Wahrnehmung von Film- und Fernsehrechten.
- The Heiner Carow Prize (for best German young film; established 2013 by the DEFA Foundation) is awarded to films shown in the Panorama program.
- Three prizes are awarded in the Encounters section (since 2020).
- Berlinale Documentary Award (since 2017), worth 40,000 Euros, sponsored by public broadcaster Rundfunk Berlin-Brandenburg (rbb), with entries from the Competition, Encounters, Panorama, Forum, Generation, Berlinale Special and Perspektive Deutsches Kino sections.
- Berlinale Series Award, established in 2023, is given to the winning television series. The first award was won by the Italian series The Good Mothers by Julian Jarrold and Elisa Amoruso.
- Panorama Audience Award, established in 1999
- Compass-Perspektive-Award, for the best film in the current Perspektive Deutsches Kino program
- Readers' awards, one each by Berliner Morgenpost and Tagesspiegel, and the Teddy Readers' Award
- Several development awards

=== Independent awards ===
The Shooting Stars Award for young European acting talent is independently awarded by European Film Promotion at Berlinale Palast.

There are also many other prizes given by independent juries (not connected to the Berlinale) at the event. These include, among others:

- FIPRESCI awards for best film in each of the Competition, Encounters, Panorama and Forum sections
- Teddy Awards, for films with LGBT topics
- Prize of the Ecumenical Jury, since 1992
- Amnesty International Film Award, since 2005
- Peace Film Prize

=== Former awards ===
- Silver Bear for Best Actor (1956–2020) (replaced by Best Leading and Supporting Performance)
- Silver Bear for Best Actress (1956–2020) (replaced by Best Leading and Supporting Performance)
- Silver Bear for Outstanding Single Achievement (1956–2005, occasional)
- Silver Bear for Special Artistic Achievement (1956–2007, occasional) (replaced by Silver Bear for Outstanding Artistic Contribution)
- Alfred Bauer Prize (1987-2020) (replaced by Silver Bear Jury Prize, after it came to light that the role played by Berlinale founding director Alfred Bauer in the Reich Film Office (German: Reichsfilmintendanz) during Nazi period was more substantial than had previously been realised, and had been covered up by Bauer after the Second World War)
- Cinema Fairbindet, an award given by Germany's Federal Ministry for Economic Cooperation and Development (BMZ) at the festival between 2011 and 2014
- Silver Bear for Film Music (2002–2007)

== Venues ==
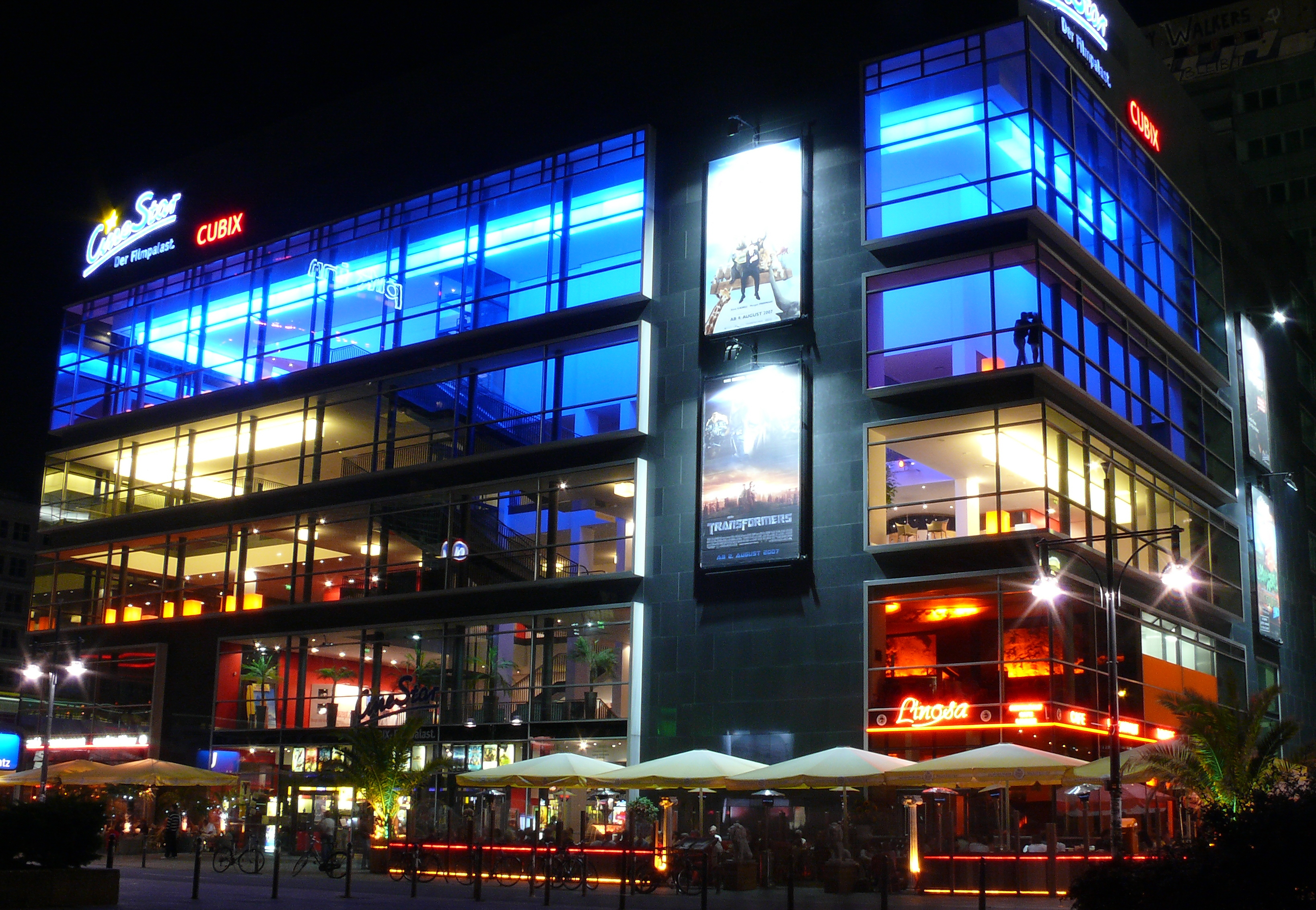
Cubix Kino at Alexanderplatz

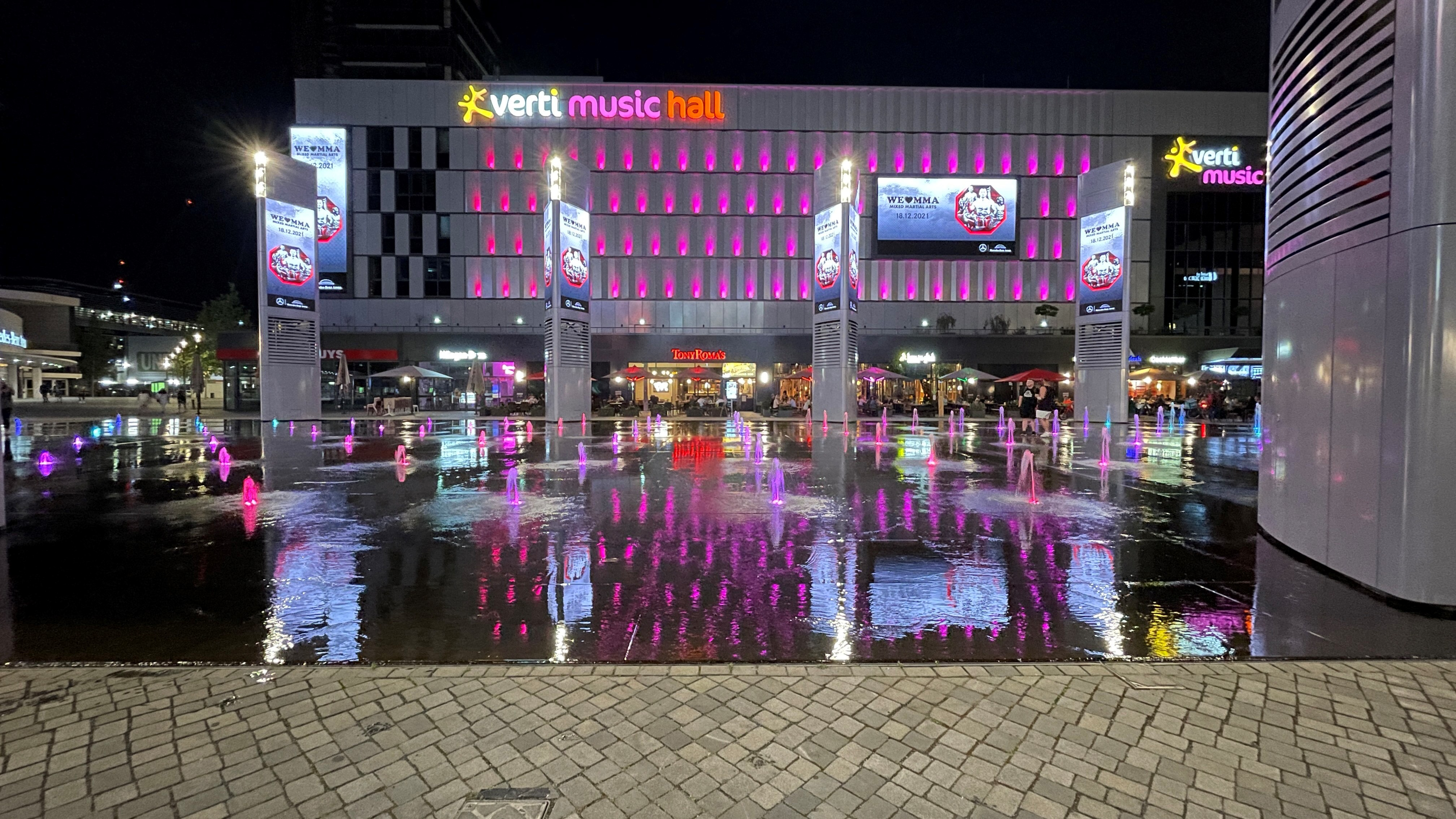
Verti Music Hall on Uber-Platz in Friedrichshain

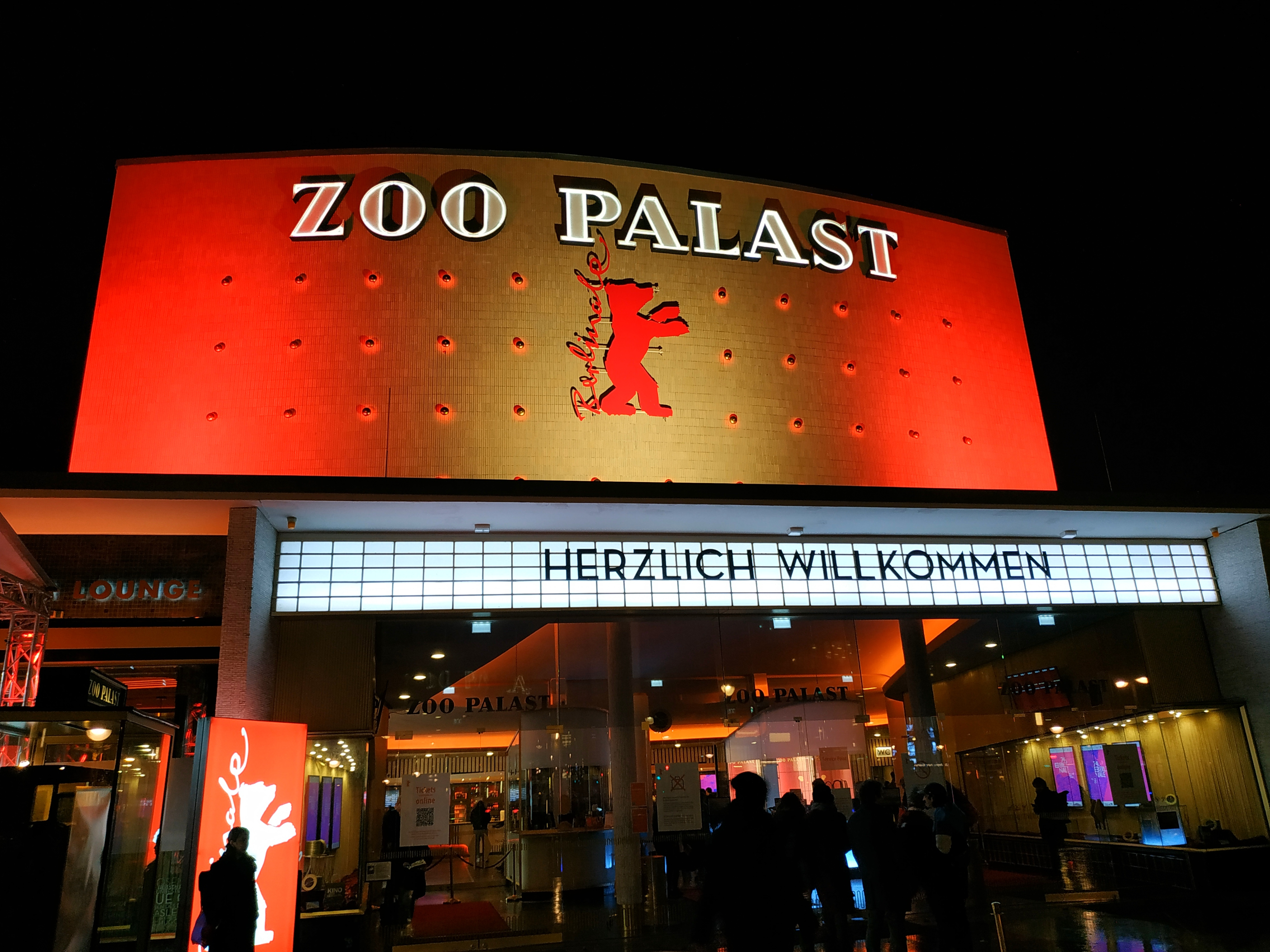
Zoo Palast

The Theater am Potsdamer Platz, a theatre for musicals which is known as the Berlinale Palast during the festival, is the venue for the premieres of Competition film and several Special Gala films, as well as the opening and awards ceremonies. The CinemaxX Potsdamer Platz, with its 19 screens, has been a Berlinale screening venue since 2000, two years after its opening in 1998, and is currently used for press screenings. A multifunctional hall with seating for 1900 during the film festival, the Uber Eats Music Hall (known from 2018 to 2024 as the Verti Music Hall) in the Friedrichshain district on the east side of Berlin became a Berlinale screening venue in 2022.

Venues for the festival in 2025 and in previous years are given in the following table (seats available at each venue as supplied on the 2025 Berlinale website).

Name	As festival venue	Seating	Location	Comments
Current venues
Academy of the Arts (AdK)	2015-	512	Hanseatenweg 10 52°31′03″N 13°20′48″E	The exhibition space and screening hall of the Academy of Arts (Akademie der Künste) in the Tiergarten district was used as a venue before the Berlinale moved its main activities to Potsdamer Platz in 2000. It was briefly a venue for the Forum program from 2015, and once again took on duties as screening venue after the closure of the Sony Center at the end of 2019.
Arsenal		235	Potsdamer Strasse 2 52°30′35″N 13°22′25″E	The Kino Arsenal at the Arsenal Institute for Film and Video Art (Institut für Film und Videokunst, formerly known as Friends of the German Film Archive until 2008) in Potsdamer Strasse is the main venue of the Forum event. The original Arsenal, in Welserstraße in Berlin-Schöneberg, was where this section was born. In 1999, Arsenal moved with Friends of German Film Archive, German Film Museum and the German Film and Television Academy Berlin into the Filmhaus on Potsdamer Platz. There are two screens here, with seating for 235 and 75.
Arsenal		75	Potsdamer Strasse 2 52°30′35″N 13°22′25″E	
Berlinale Palast	2000–	1639	Marlene-Dietrich-Platz 1 52°30′25″N 13°22′18″E	
CinemaxX	2000	19 screens with total of 1500 seats	Potsdamer Strasse 5 52°30′31″N 13°22′26″E	Used for market screenings and select press screenings according to 2025 website.
City Kino Wedding		218	Müllerstrasse 74 52°33′31″N 13°20′23″E	
Colosseum		525	Schönhauser Allee 123 52°32′52″N 13°07′44″E	Opened in 1924 with 1200 seats
CineStar CUBIX	2007-	(9 screens)	Rathausstrasse 1 52°31′13″N 13°24′43″E	In 2007, the CineStar CUBIX multiplex cinema (Cubix am Alexanderplatz, styled CUBIX), which opened in November 2000, started screening films for the festival on three of its screens. From 2020, after the closure of the Sony Center, the festival expanded its use of CineStar CUBIX to use all nine screens.
Delphi Filmpalast	since 1950s	675	Kantstrasse 12a 52°30′22″N 13°19′42″E	The historic Delphi Filmpalast am Zoo (aka the Delphi; built on the site of an old dance hall, was opened in 1949 by Walter Jonigkeit. It is located near the Berlin Zoologischer Garten and has been used for the festival almost since its inception. Since 1981 it has been one of the main venues for the Forum programme, maintaining its old style as a picture palace. In 2015 the stalls seating was replaced, reducing the number of seats by 114 and improving spacing and comfort. Seating an audience of up to 673 people, it is one of Germany's biggest independent screens. In February 2022, ready for the 72nd edition of the festival, a state-of-the-art Christie CP4440-RGB laser cinema projector was installed.
Deutsche Kinemathek/E-Werk	1977—	157	Mauerstrasse 79 52°30′31″N 13°23′14″E	The Deutsche Kinemathek opened in 1963.Since 1977, the Deutsche Kinemathek has supervised the annual "Retrospective and Homage" section of the Berlinale.
Filmtheater am Friedrichshain (FaF)		323	Bötzowstrasse 1-5 52°31′44″N 13°25′49″E	
Hebbel am Ufer (HAU) 1 and 2	2007—	505	Stresemannstrasse 29 52°30′00″N 13°23′14″E	HAU was founded in 2003 by combining three theatres[1] in Kreuzberg, Berlin.
Hebbel am Ufer (HAU) 1 and 2	2007—	199	Hallesches Ufer 34 52°29′57″N 13°23′09″E	HAU was founded in 2003 by combining three theatres[1] in Kreuzberg, Berlin.
Haus der Berliner Festspiele (HdBF)		over 1000	Schaperstrasse 24 52°29′55″N 13°19′43″E	Haus der Berliner Festspiele is a listed building with seating for over 1000 visitors and now used regularly for screenings at the Berlinale.
Haus der Kulturen der Welt (HFW)		1012	John-Foster-Dulles-Allee 10 52°31′07″N 13°21′52″E	The Haus der Kulturen der Welt, in the middle of Tiergarten Park, is the venue for the premieres of Generation, the youth section of the festival.
HUB75			Marlene-Dietrich-Platz 52°30′25″N 13°22′18″E	As of 2025 this serves as a temporary festival hub for meetings between members of the film industry as well as some podium discussions and talks open to the public.
JVA Plötzensee (correctional institution)		150	Friedrich-Olbrich-Damm 16 52°32′23″N 13°19′21″E	Since 2018 the organizers of the Berlinale have scheduled screenings at the correctional institution, since 2019 external visitors can also register for tickets.
Kino im Zeiss-Großplanetarium		307	Prenzlauer Allee 80 52°32′35″N 13°25′40″E	The Zeiss Major Planetarium is a planetarium, which has two spaces available for film screenings, the planetarium hall with 307 seats, and a cinema hall with 160 seats. It was one of the last buildings built in the GDR, constructed in 1987.
Kino im Zeiss-Großplanetarium		160	Prenzlauer Allee 80 52°32′35″N 13°25′40″E	The Zeiss Major Planetarium is a planetarium, which has two spaces available for film screenings, the planetarium hall with 307 seats, and a cinema hall with 160 seats. It was one of the last buildings built in the GDR, constructed in 1987.
KLICK Kino		84	Windscheidstrasse 19 52°30′19″N 13°17′58″E	
Odeon Kino		265	Hauptstrasse 116 52°28′56″N 13°20′58″E	First opened in 1950.
SAVVY Contemporary		84	Reinickendorfer Strasse 17 52°32′41″N 13°22′14″E	
Silent Green Kulturquartier		250	Gerichtstrasse 35 52°32′46″N 13°21′59″E	Formerly used as a crematorium and columbarium, this facility has been renovated and in 2015 was opened as a cultural events venue.
SİNEMA TRANSTOPIA		79	Lindower Strasse 20/22, Haus C 52°32′38″N 13°22′02″E	opened in 2023 as a transnational centre for cultural encounters
Stage Bluemax Theater		526	Marlene-Dietrich-Platz 4 52°23′31″N 13°22′22″E	
Thalia (Thalia Potsdam)		350	Rudolf-Breitscheid-Strasse 50, Potsdam 52°23′31″N 13°05′43″E	
Uber Eats Music Hall	2018–	1900	Uber Platz 2 52°30′19″N 13°26′38″E	known as Verti Music Hall until 2024
Urania Berlin		866	An der Urania 17 52°30′04″N 13°20′53″E	Urania Berlin is used for film premieres in the Generation section.
Wolf Kino		49	Weserstrasse 59 52°28′58″N 13°26′30″E	
Zoo Palast 1 & 2	1957—1999;2014—	779	Hardenbergstrasse 29a 52°30′21″N 13°20′00″E	*The Zoo Palast was built in 1957 to designs by cinema architect Gerhard Fritsche, and opened with the film Die Zürcher Verlobung, starring Liselotte Pulver, who also cut the ribbon in the opening ceremony. It was purpose-built for the festival. It remained the home of the festival Until 1999, and was the venue for films premiering in competition. It closed from 2011 until late 2013 for a complete interior reconstruction and renovation, opening in time for the 2014 festival with seven cinemas and offering a total of 1,650 seats, and space for 791 in the main auditorium. The renovations were designed by architect Anna Maske. Liselotte Pulver again reopened the cinema after renovations in 1994 and 2013.
Zoo Palast 1 & 2	1957—1999;2014—	275	Hardenbergstrasse 29a 52°30′21″N 13°20′00″E	
Previous venues
Titiana-Palast	1951 – ?	1200	Schlosstrasse 5-6 52°27′51″N 13°19′35″E	The first festival was screened at the Titiana-Palast in Steglitz, as well as the open-air cinema at Waldbühne, in June 1951. The Titiana Palast building, dating from 1926, still bears this name on a sign outside, but as of 2022 is known as the Cineplex Titania. It was renovated in 2014, creating seven cinemas with over 1,200 seats, along with 7.1 Dolby Digital sound technology.
Waldbühne			Glockenturmstraße 1 52°30′56″N 13°13′45″E	The first festival was screened at the Titiana-Palast in Steglitz, as well as the open-air cinema at Waldbühne, in June 1951. The Titiana Palast building, dating from 1926, still bears this name on a sign outside, but as of 2022 is known as the Cineplex Titania. It was renovated in 2014, creating seven cinemas with over 1,200 seats, along with 7.1 Dolby Digital sound technology.
CineStar SonyCenter	until 2019			The eight-screen CineStar Sony Center, and later the adjoining CineStar IMAX, both located in the Sony Center at Potsdamer Platz, were public venues until the closure of the Sony Center at the end of 2019.
Kino Babylon	2008–2011		Rosa-Luxemburg-Strasse 30 52°31′34″N 13°24′41″E	The Kino Babylon was a Berlinale venue from 2008 (when it hosted its new "Generation14plus" event) to 2010, but has not been listed as such since 2011.
Friedrichstadt-Palast	2009-2022	1635	Friedrichstrasse 107 52°31′26″N 13°23′19″E	This venue not only has the largest theatre stage in the world, but was the biggest cinema of the film festival, with 1,635 seats available for screenings. Films from the Competition and Berlinale Special Gala sections were shown at Friedrichstadt-Palast, and a digital 4K laser projector was supplied for the festival. As of 2023 festival screenings previously show at the Friedrichsstadt-Palast have been relocated to the recently built Uber Eats Music Hall (known as Verti Music Hall between 2018 and 2023).
Kino International	2010s-2024	555	Karl-Marx-Allee 33 52°31′14″N 13°25′22″E	The historic Kino International, built in the 1960s to the designs of GDR architect Josef Kaiser, is an example of GDR Modernism. It has been one of the venues for the Berlinale since sometime in the mid-2010s, accommodating an audience of 555 people (originally built for 600). The cinema is closed for renovation and schedule to reopen in 2026.

== Related events ==
=== European Film Market ===
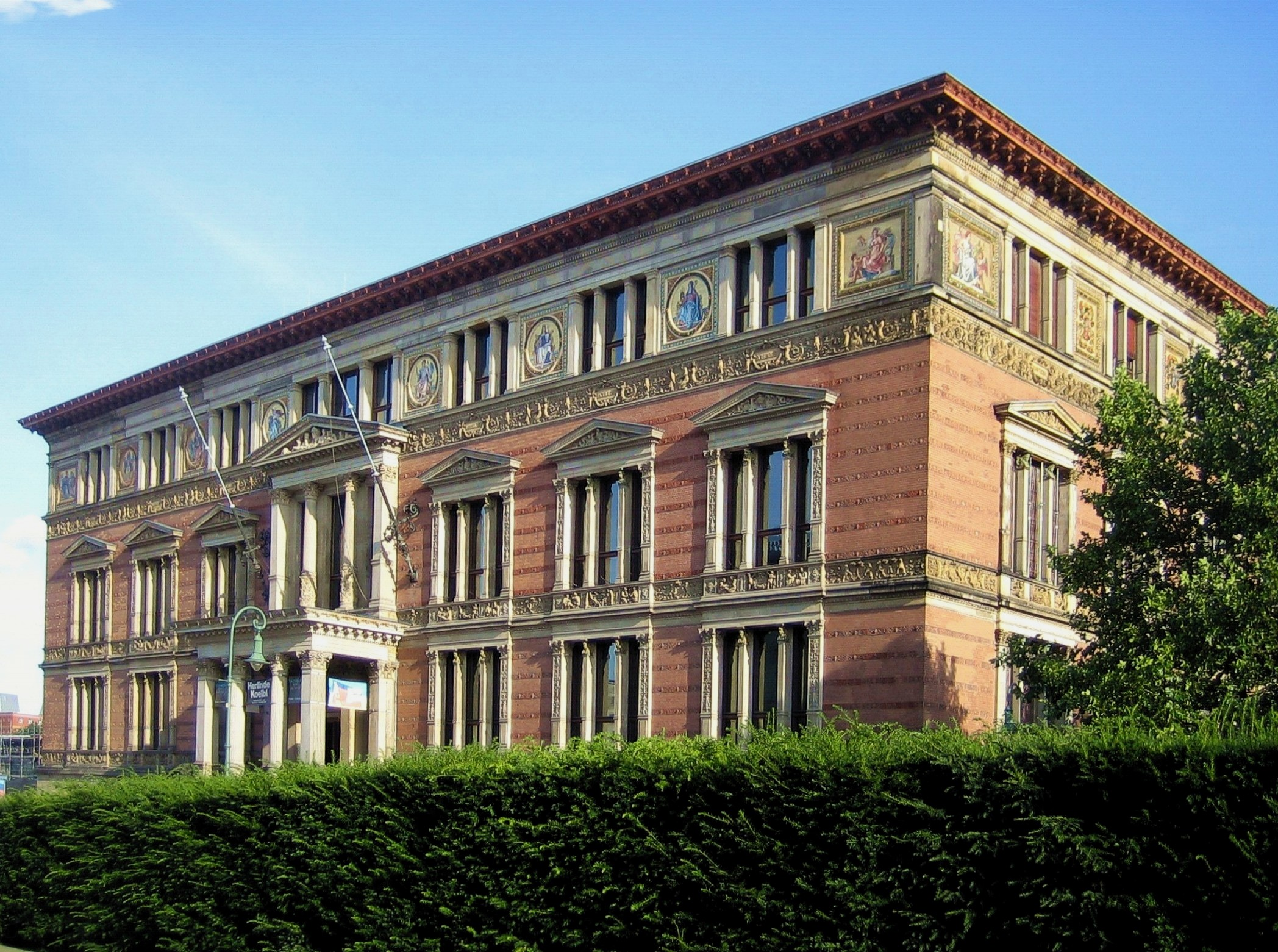
Martin-Gropius-Bau

The European Film Market (EFM) is a large trade fair for marketing films, which grew from an event started in 1978.

Filmmesse was an event led by Aina Bellis from 1980 to 1987, being succeeded by Beki Probst in 1988. From 2014 to October 2020, Matthijs Wouter Knol took over the position. In November 2020, Dennis Ruh became the director of the EFM.

It has grown into one of three largest movie markets in the world, and is the first film market of the year; the Marché du Film in Cannes follows in May, and the American Film Market in November.

EFM provides exhibition space for companies presenting their current line-up, organising screenings of new films in venues around Potsdamer Platz. In 2007, the CinemaxX and CineStar were used to showcase new productions. In 2010, the Astor Film Lounge showed market screenings in three dimensions using digital RealD technology.

It is a professional trade event, open to registered industry insiders, hosting up to 10,000 representatives of the international film and media industries (mostly producers, sales agents, distributors and financiers). In 2020, 971 screenings of 732 registered movies took place, with 525 films celebrating their premiere. Taking place over eight days, the event is spread across several locations, including the Gropius Bau, Marriott Hotel, modern Berliner Freiheit or the historic Zoo Palast.

=== Berlinale Talents ===
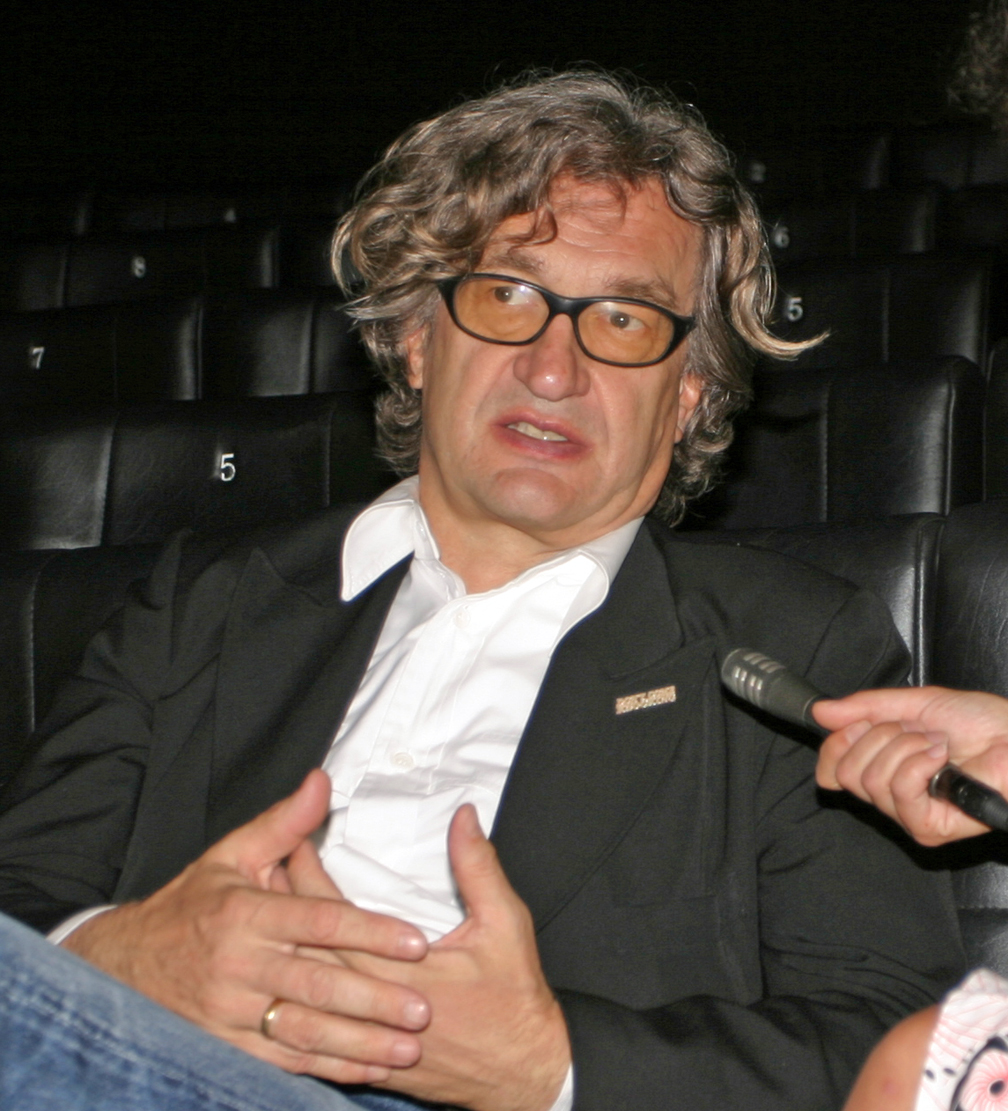
Wim Wenders attended the Talent Campus as a lecturer.

Commencing in 2003, the Berlinale has partnered with the Berlinale Talents (previously Berlinale Talent Campus), which is a winter school for "up-and-coming filmmakers" that takes place at the same time as the festival. The Talent Campus accepts about 250 applicants each year; the attendees come from around the world, and represent all of the filmmaking professions.

The event runs six days during the Berlinale and features lectures and panel discussions with well-known professionals addressing issues in filmmaking. Workshops, excursions, personal tutoring, coaching, and training of participants from different fields of work are part of the programme.

The proceedings include presentations by experts, who have included Park Chan-wook, Frances McDormand, Stephen Frears, Dennis Hopper, Jia Zhangke, Walter Murch, Shah Rukh Khan, Joshua Oppenheimer, Anthony Minghella, Charlotte Rampling, Walter Salles, Ridley Scott, Raoul Peck, Tom Tykwer, Mike Leigh, Tilda Swinton, and Wim Wenders. Many of these presentations and lectures are archived, both as video recordings and as transcripts, on the Talents website.

=== Berlinale Co-Production Market ===
The Berlinale Co-Production Market is a five-day networking platform for producers and financiers, as well as broadcasting and funding representatives who are participating in international co-productions. It was introduced by Dieter Kosslick in the 2000s.

== Jury presidents ==
Since 1956, the jury of the Festival has been chaired by an internationally recognised personality of cinema, except in 2021, when the directors of six previous Golden-Bear-winning films determined the awards for the Competition of the 71st Berlinale.

== World Cinema Fund ==
The World Cinema Fund (WCF) is associated with the Berlinale, and was established to provide financial support to feature film projects in countries with a weak film industry infrastructure. It was established by Dieter Kosslick in 2004 to support films "that stand out with an unconventional aesthetic approach, that tell powerful stories and transmit an authentic image of their cultural roots". It awards several projects in various stages of production with funding each year.

The WCF is a collaboration with the Federal Foundation for Culture, and awarded in cooperation with the Goethe Institute, the Foreign Ministry and German producers. It aims "to develop and support cinema in regions with a weak film infrastructure, while fostering cultural diversity in German cinemas", and supports films that could not be made without extra funding. It provides funding for production and distribution of feature films and feature-length documentaries, with a focus on countries in Latin America, Central America, the Caribbean, Africa, the Middle East, Central Asia, Southeast Asia, and the Caucasus, as well as Bangladesh, Nepal, Mongolia, and Sri Lanka.

Films receiving funding from the WCF have included:

- Paradise Now (2005, Palestine)
- The Other (2007, Argentina)
- Ajami (2009, Israel/Palestine)
- The Wind Journeys (2009, Colombia, Argentina)
- Harmony Lessons (2013, Kazakhstan)
- Big Father, Small Father and Other Stories (Vietnam, 2015)
- Rojo (2018, Argentina)
- Talking About Trees (2019, Sudan, Chad)
- Whether the Weather Is Fine (Philippines, 2021)

== Gallery ==
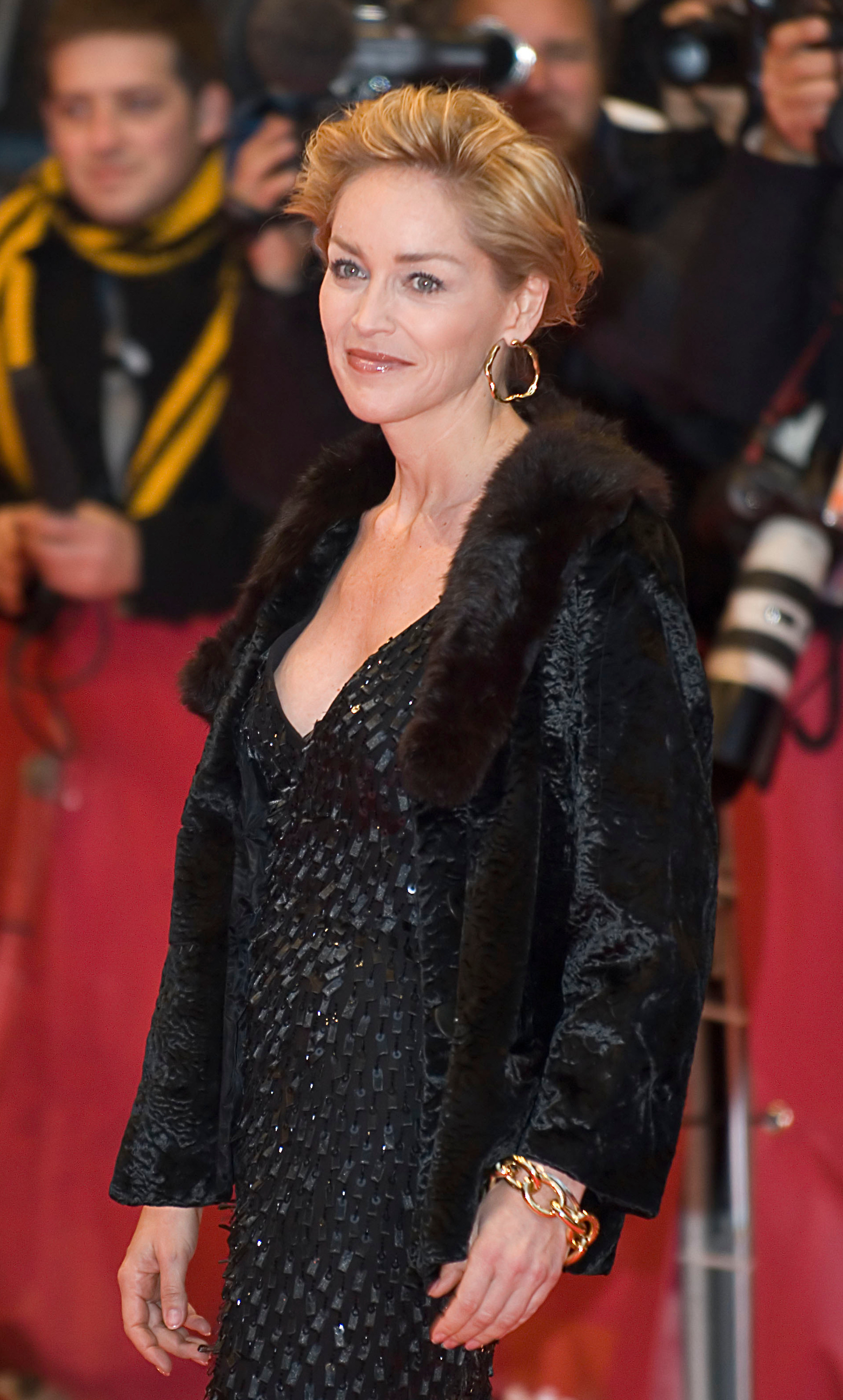
Sharon Stone in 2007

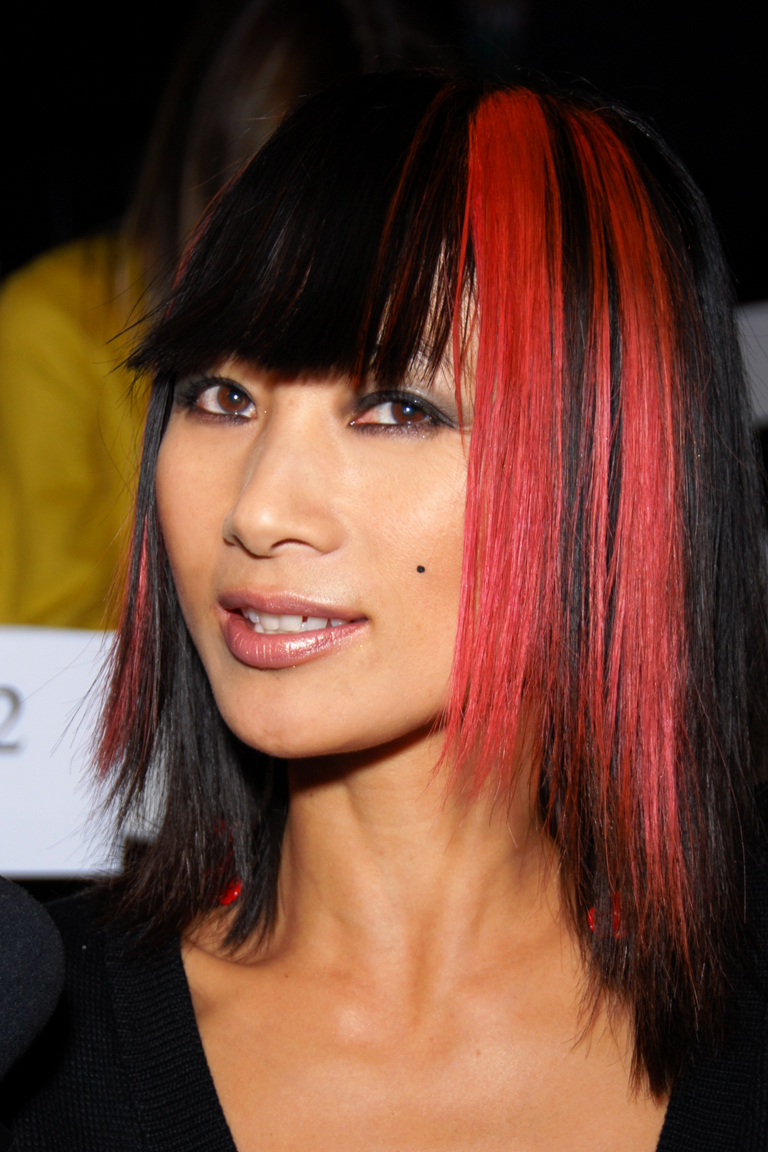
Bai Ling in 2007

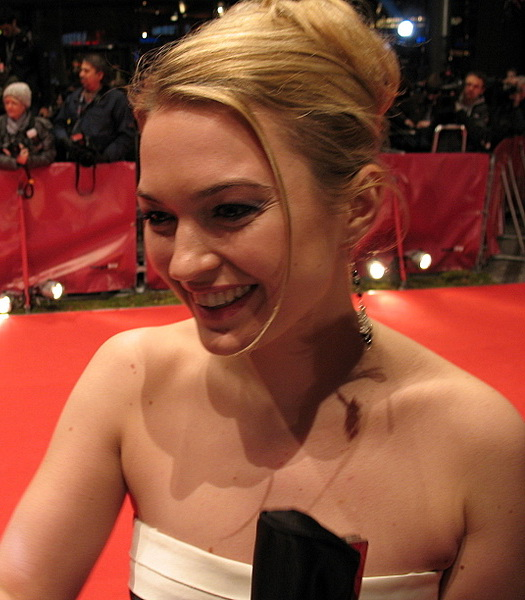
Sophia Myles at Berlinale in 2007

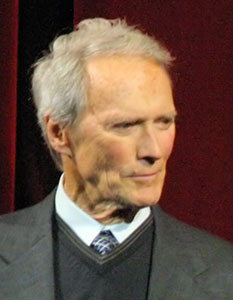
Clint Eastwood at Berlinale in 2007

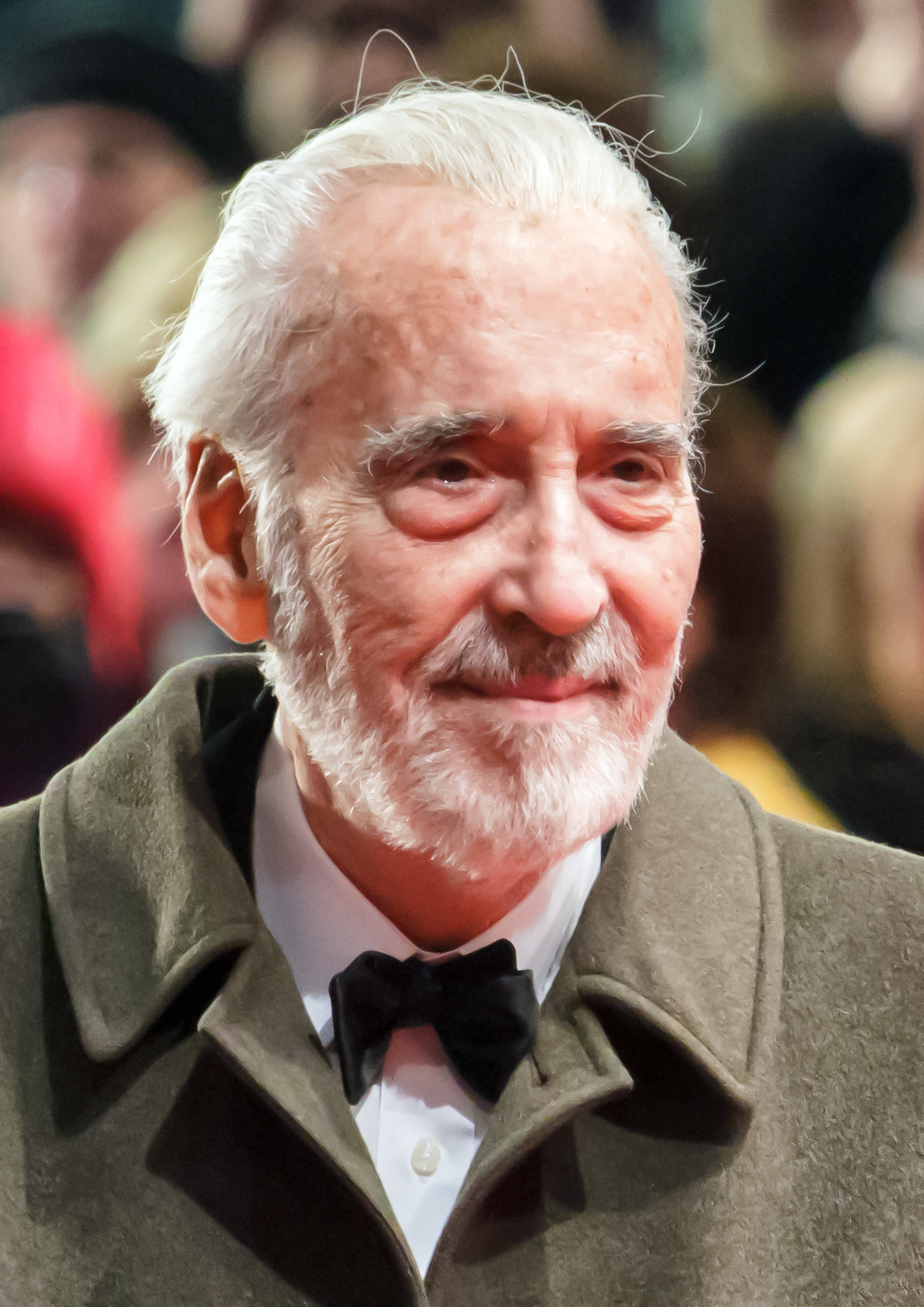
Christopher Lee at Berlinale in 2013

== See also ==
- German Cinema
- Cinema of Europe
- List of films set in Berlin
- World cinema
- List of Big Three film festivals winners
