= Alfred Bauer =

German jurist and film historian (1911–1986)

Alfred Bauer (November 18, 1911 in Würzburg – October 19, 1986 in Berlin) was a German lawyer and film historian. From 1942 to 1945, he was a consultant at the Reich Film Directorate, and from 1951 to 1976, the director of the Berlin International Film Festival.

== Biography ==
Alfred Bauer was the son of the later chief librarian of the University Library Würzburg, Fritz Bauer. Even before studying law and art history, he began building a collection of film literature. Bauer joined the NSDStB or Nationalsozialistischer Deutscher Studentenbund (lit. The National Socialist German Students' League) and, on November 5, 1933, became a member of the SA. He applied for membership in the NSDAP on June 9, 1937, and was retroactively accepted as of May 1 of that year (membership number 4.401.355).

Immediately after his graduation, he joined the NSRB, the professional organization for lawyers in the Third Reich, on October 1, 1935, and passed his assessor exam in Berlin in 1939. During his legal clerkship (1935–1939), Bauer earned a doctorate in law at the University of Würzburg in July 1938 with a dissertation on film law. His student file, located in the University of Würzburg archives, does not reveal the subject of his dissertation nor his activities in the NSDStB. His doctoral thesis remains lost. After the war began, Bauer was conscripted into the Wehrmacht (Flak) and was discharged on March 23, 1942, due to health problems.

After three years as a soldier, in 1942, he became an employee of UFI. Before hiring him, the Ministry of Propaganda required a declaration of his political suitability, which was provided by the Local Group Leader of the NS-Gaue Main Franconia: Bauer was "an eager SA man" and a "full commitment to state and movement [was] expected."

From 1942 to 1945, Bauer worked as a consultant in the Reich Film Chamber and was assigned to the 20-member Reich Film Directorate, established in 1942. As such, he was involved in selecting Exemptions from Military Service for Film Workers. According to a study, Bauer played a significant role in the functioning and stabilization and legitimization of the German film industry during the Nazi dictatorship, which he systematically concealed after 1945.

During his denazification process (1945–1947), Bauer tried to conceal his past through false statements and half-truths and to create the image of an active opponent of the Nazi regime. While his argumentative and defensive strategies show similarities to comparable cases, the audacity and persistence of his approach stand out. They reveal Bauer's opportunism in relation to the Nazi regime. After his denazification process concluded, Bauer was able to continue his career in the German film industry. On July 6, 1950, he submitted a memorandum to the Mayor of Berlin, Ernst Reuter, the three Allied city commanders, and the Berlin Film Industry Association, proposing the creation of a film institute in Berlin. He also suggested establishing an annual film festival. In November of that year, the Allies, led by the American film officer Oscar Martay, tasked him with planning and organizing a film festival in Berlin. The first Berlin International Film Festival, or Berlinale, took place in June 1951 under Bauer's leadership.

From 1945, Bauer worked as a film advisor to the British Military Government. In 1950, he published the German Feature Film Almanac 1929–1950, which was based on his experience in the Reich Film Directorate. "Thanks to his work in the Reich Film Chamber and UFI, Bauer was able to collect the officially recorded data of the feature films produced during the Nazi era, from which he compiled the Almanac [German Feature Film Almanac 1929–1950]". He immediately began planning its sequel but could not complete it due to professional reasons, eventually publishing German Feature Film Almanac Volume 2: 1946–1955 in 1981.

In the summer of 1951, the first Berlin Film Festival was opened, with Alfred Bauer appointed as its first director. The Berlinale was founded at the initiative of the Jewish US film officer Oscar Martay. Protests arose against Bauer's appointment, due to his work in the Reich Film Chamber, but these were suppressed by the American occupying forces.

In 1973, film historian Wolfgang Becker (1943–2012) pointed out that Alfred Bauer had worked in the Reich Film Directorate and had been one of its two consultants. This close involvement with the Reich Film Directorate and, consequently, with the Nazi propaganda apparatus, was also highlighted by Hans C. Blumenberg (1993), Felix Moeller (1998), Tereza Dvořáková and Ivan Klimeš (2008).

== Legacy ==
Bauer's work led to the growth of the Berlinale festival and its eventual international recognition. In 1976, Bauer retired and was succeeded by Wolf Donner. After Bauer's death in 1986, the Berlinale established the Alfred Bauer Prize to honor "a feature film that opens new perspectives on cinematic art."

In 2020, this prize was suspended after a study commissioned by the Berlinale revealed Bauer's close ties to the Nazi regime.

Bauer’s controversial past was revealed in an article in Die Zeit, which uncovered historical research suggesting that Bauer was both a member of the Nazi party, and a member of the SA, the Nazis’ pre-war paramilitary wing. He also seemed to be a key part of a body established by Joseph Goebbels' propaganda ministry to control the cinema industry. Die Zeit’s research suggested that Bauer had tried to portray himself as "a quiet opponent of the Nazi regime", making frequent false statements about the roles he had had during the war.
