= CineStar =

German movie theater chain

Cinestar
- Company type: GmbH
- Industry: Entertainment
- Founded: 1948
- Headquarters: Lübeck, Germany
- Number of locations: 95
- Area served: Germany, Croatia, Czech Republic, Bosnia and Herzegovina, Italy, Kosovo, Serbia
- Key people: Jane Hastings, Oliver Fock
- Parent: EVT Limited
- Website: www.cinestar.de

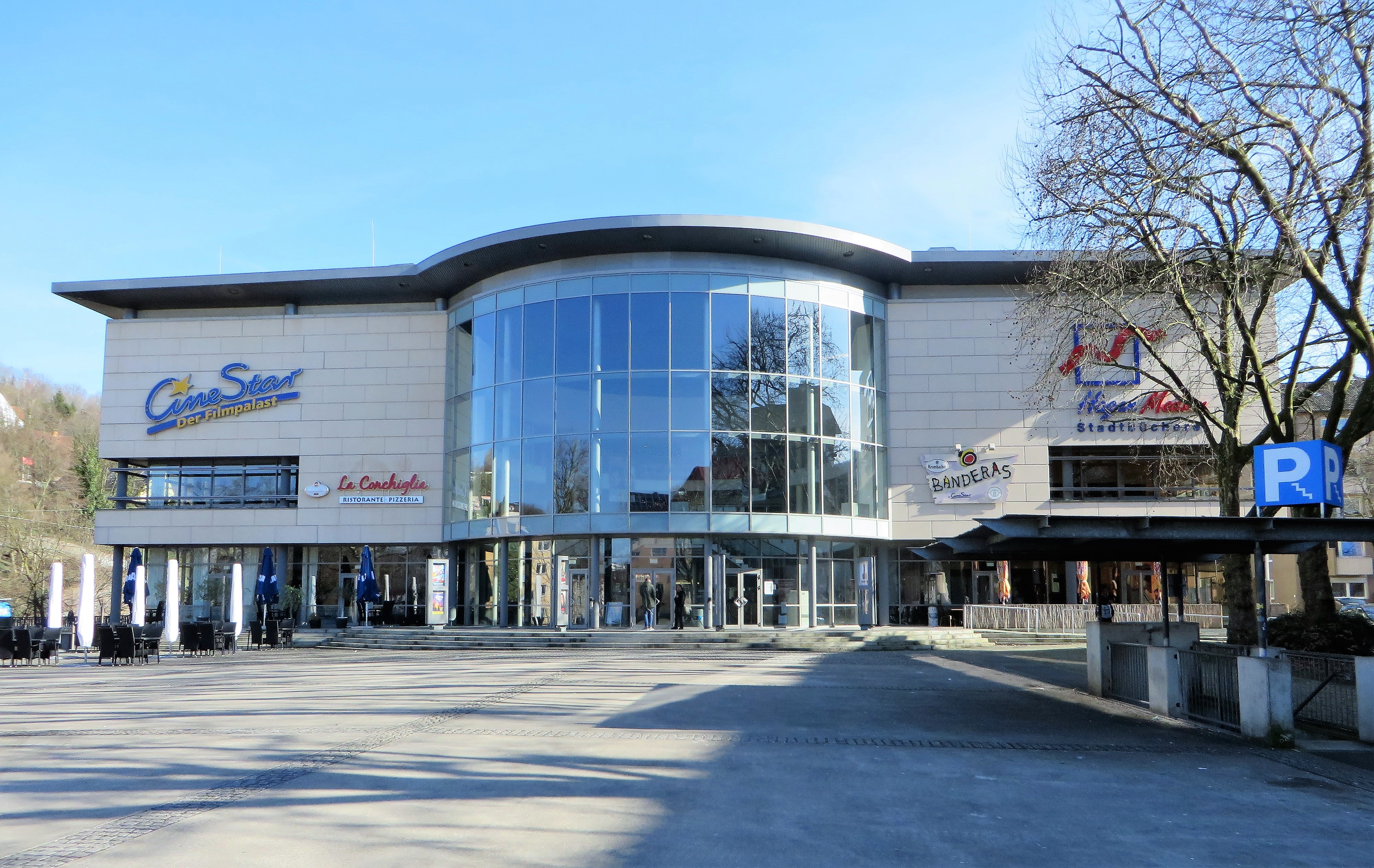
CineStar in Hagen, Germany

CineStar is a cinema company based in Lübeck, Germany.

The company was founded in 1948, and is the largest cinema chain in Germany and Croatia. It also has locations in Czech Republic, Bosnia and Herzegovina, Italy, Serbia, and Kosovo.

== Locations ==
The CineStar Cubix am Alexanderplatz, styled CUBIX), is a multiplex on Alexanderplatz in Berlin which opened in November 2000. It has screened films for the Berlin International Film Festival (Berlinale) cinemas since 2007.

CineStar's multiplex in the Sony Center, Potsdamer Platz, Berlin, along with the adjoining IMAX theatre, was another venue for the Berlinale, before their closure at the end of 2019.
