= Dieter Kosslick =

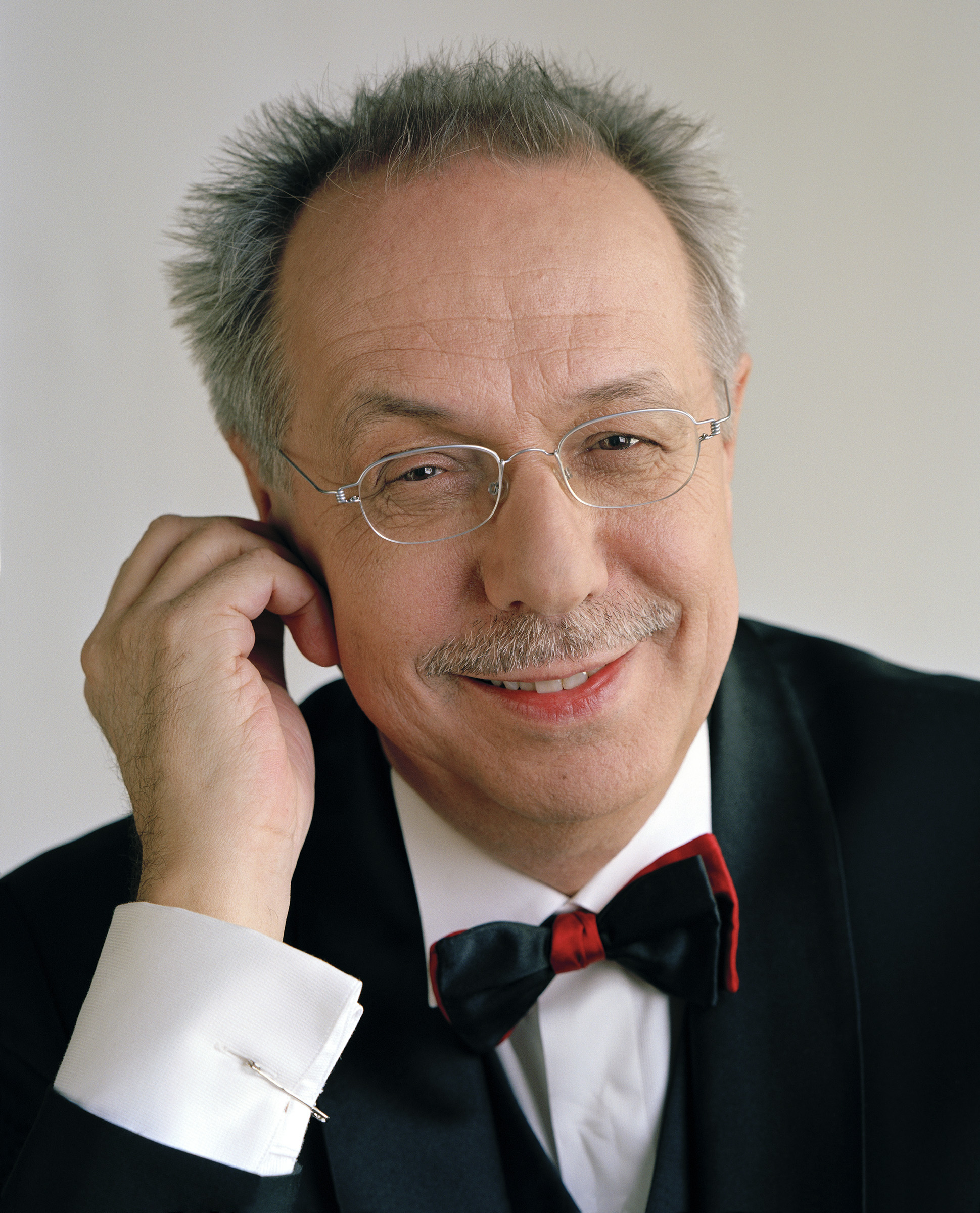
- Dieter Kosslick photographed by Oliver Mark, Berlin 2008

4th Director of the Berlin International Film Festival
- Incumbent
- Assumed office 1 May 2001
- Appointed by: Eberhard Diepgen
- Preceded by: Moritz de Hadeln

Personal details
- Born: Pforzheim, Germany
- Education: LMU Munich
- Occupation: Film critic, journalist, researcher

Dieter Kosslick is a German film critic, journalist and researcher. He was the fourth director of the Berlin International Film Festival (Berlinale) from 1 May 2001, when he took over from Moritz de Hadeln, until 2019.

== Early life ==
Born in Pforzheim and raised in Ispringen, Dieter Kosslick studied Communication, Politics and Education at LMU Munich. After receiving his master's degree, he continued at the university as a research assistant before moving to Hamburg in 1979 to work as speechwriter and office administrator for the First Mayor of Hamburg Hans-Ulrich Klose and later as press spokesman for the "women's equality" unit. He left this position in 1982 to work as a journalist for the political magazine "konkret".

== Career ==
In 1983, he became involved in film funding, starting as managing director of Hamburg's cultural film fund (Hamburg Film Office). In 1986, he founded the European Low Budget Forum with the cinema "Kino auf der Alster". In 1988, he became managing director of the city's economic film fund (Hamburg Film Fund - Filmförderung Hamburg Schleswig-Holstein). The same year, he was a co-founder of the EFDO (European Film Distribution Office) and became the president of this European organisation, a post he held until EFDO's dissolution in 1996.

In 1992, the federal state of North Rhine-Westphalia and WDR (West German broadcasting corporation) attracted Kosslick to the Rhine to head up the barely one-year-old "Filmstiftung NRW" as its executive director. During his nine years in office, North-Rhine-Westphalia became the leading German film site and established itself internationally as an important film region.

In July 2000 the federal state and city of Berlin as well as the Federal Government of Germany appointed him director of Germany's prestigious Berlin International Film Festival. Kosslick assumed the role on 1 May 2001.

Kosslick launched new sections and initiatives within the Berlin Film Festival, among which are the section Perspektive Deutsches Kino for young German film, the Co-Production Market and the World Cinema Fund, as well as the Culinary Cinema in 2007 (dropped after his departure, from 2020). His contract was extended for a further five years in 2014 until 2019.

In 2021, he published his autobiography "Immer auf dem Teppich bleiben".

== Honors ==
Dieter Kosslick has received many honours and awards for the diverse ways in which he has promoted film and culture; the Bundesverdienstkreuz, and the Chevalier des Arts et des Lettres, among others.
