= Tricia Tuttle =

American film journalist

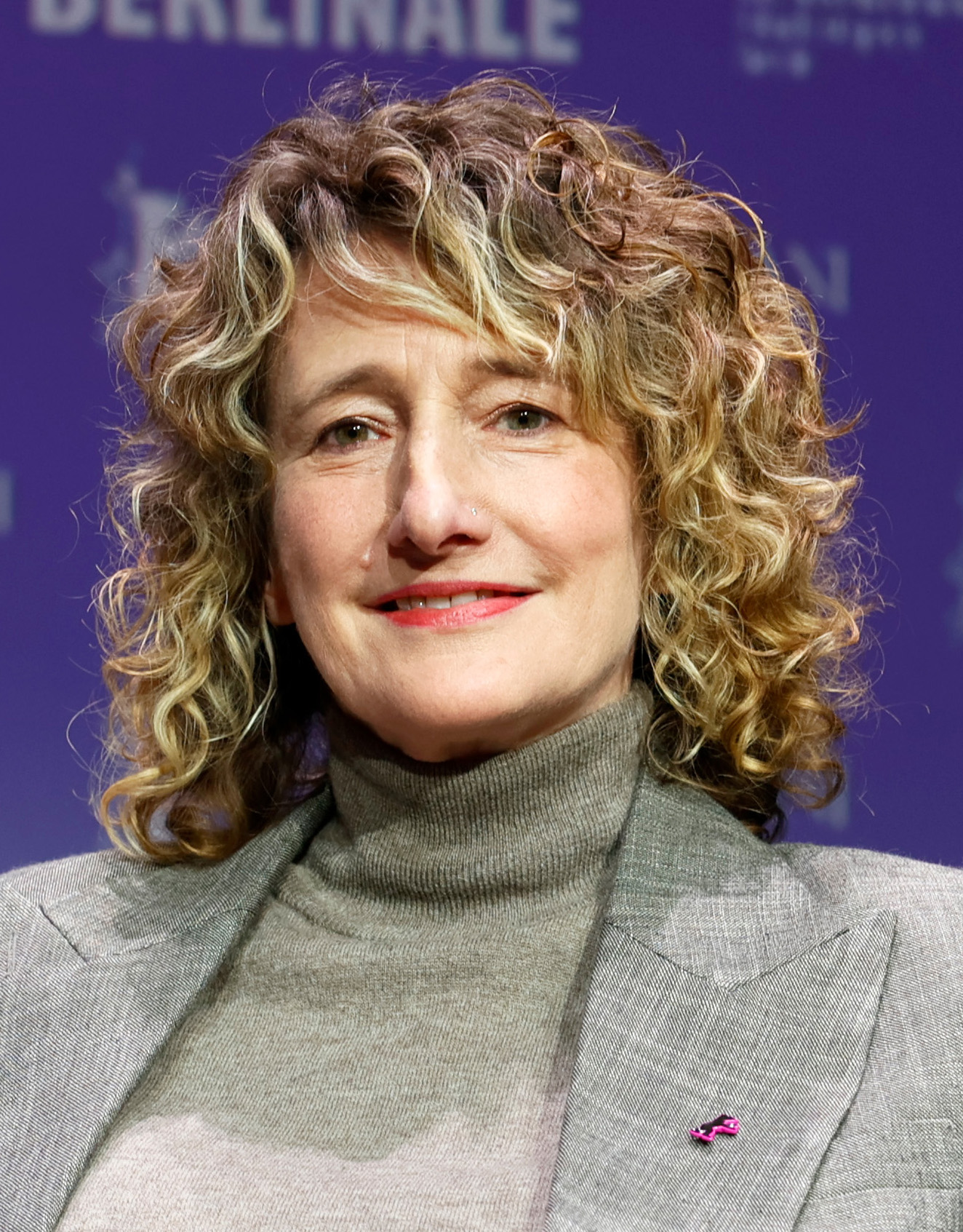
- Tuttle in 2026
- Born: 1970 (age 55–56); North Carolina
- Education: University of North Carolina, Chapel Hill (BA); Birkbeck, University of London
- Occupations: Festival programmer; film journalist; curator

Tricia Tuttle (born 1970) is an American festival programmer, film journalist, and curator. Since 2024, she has served as the director of the Berlin International Film Festival.

== Life and career ==
Tuttle was born in 1970 in North Carolina. She played as a guitarist for the musical act June. She earned a bachelor's degree on Literature and Radio, Television and Motion Pictures from the University of North Carolina at Chapel Hill, and a masters in film studies from the Birkbeck, University of London and British Film Institute (BFI). In 1997, she relocated to the United Kingdom. She worked as a programmer for The Script Factory and the London Lesbian and Gay Film Festival. Afterwards, she served as senior manager of BAFTA for five years until she was hired as BFI deputy head of festivals in 2013. From 2018 to 2022, she helmed the BFI London Film Festival. She took over the directionship of the Berlin International Film Festival on 1 April 2024. In 2024, ahead of the 75th Berlinale, she claimed that the perception of German overpolicing of speech on the Israel–Gaza conflict was putting artists off the festival.

In 2025, she received the Most Excellent Order of the British Empire (MBE) for her contributions to film. In the same year she was appointed the jury member at the 31st Sarajevo Film Festival for Competition Programme – Feature Film.
