= June (North Carolina band) =

American indie rock band

- Origin: Chapel Hill, North Carolina
- Genres: Indie Rock
- Years active: 1992–1996
- Labels: Beggars Banquet
- Members: Kat Cook, vocals Tricia Tuttle, guitar and vocals Andy Magowan, bass John Price, guitar John Howie Jr., drums
- Past members: Mathew Gross, drums

June was an American indie rock band from Chapel Hill, North Carolina.

== History ==
June was active in Chapel Hill from 1992 to 1996, playing "moody, highly literate guitar-pop" with a "pretty but not wispy" sound. The band released three singles (one of them produced by Mitch Easter) and became the subject of a minor bidding war before signing to Beggars Banquet in 1995. Their first album, I Am Beautiful, was recorded in Nashville, Tennessee, and released in spring 1996. The band broke up in August 1996, after a final live performance that month at an all-day music festival held at Durham Athletic Park.

== Members ==
- Kat Cook - vocals
- John Price - guitar
- Tricia Tuttle - guitar and vocals
- Andy Magowan - bass guitar, violin
- Mathew Gross - drums (1992–1994)
- John Howie Jr. - drums (1995–1996)

Cook and Tuttle were previously heard together in Zo, a Charlotte band.

== Discography ==
- I Am Beautiful (1996)

== Singles ==
- "I Am Beautiful" / "Theme of the Anti-Hero" (spring 1993, Friction Media; out of print)
- "Stripteaser" / "Long Dance" (autumn 1993, Friction Media; out of print)
- "Genius" / "All of Me" (1994, Squealer Records)
