= Boulevard der Stars =

Walk of Fame in Germany

Coordinates: 52°30′33″N 13°22′26″E

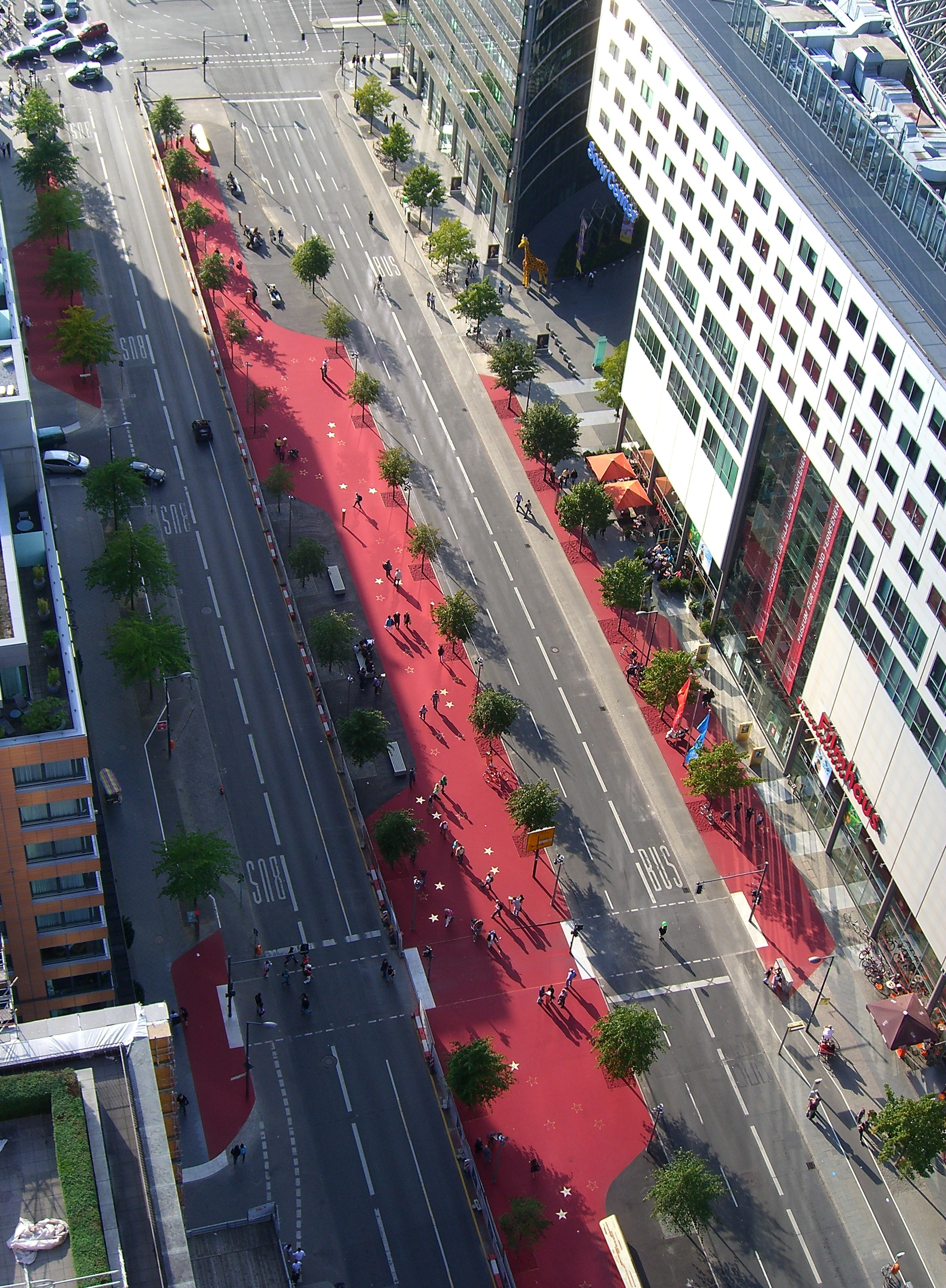

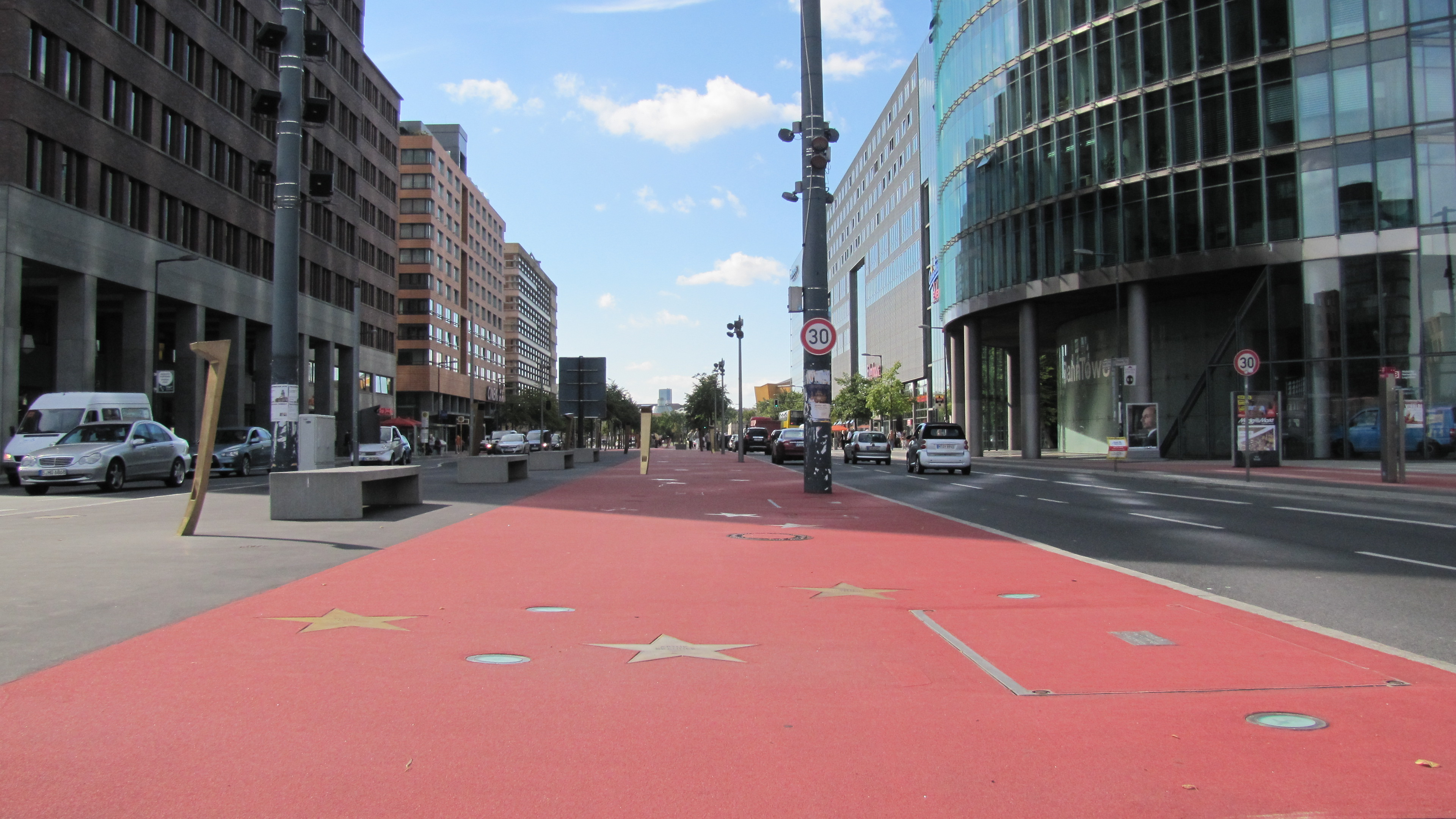

The Boulevard der Stars ("Avenue of the Stars") is a continuously growing monument in honor of famous German personalities from the film and television industry. The monument is located near the Berlin square Potsdamer Platz and extends along Potsdamer Straße from Potsdamer Platz to Ben-Gurion-Straße. In front of some buildings, it is widened on both sides.

The monument was designed according to the example of the Hollywood Walk of Fame in Los Angeles and honors famous personalities with a star. The cornerstone was laid on February 5, 2010, on the occasion of the Berlinale 2010 Film Festival. The first star, in honor of Marlene Dietrich, was presented to the public on February 12. When the monument was officially inaugurated on September 10, 2010, an additional 39 stars were awarded.

== History ==
Film historian Gero Gandert had the idea for the Boulevard der Stars back in 2002. However, an initial competition for the design of the memorial site failed in 2004 due to local conditions. As a result, the framework was modified and an initial selection process was carried out, in which 153 applicants from Germany and mainly from other European countries took part. In February 2009, the Berlin Senate announced a competition for the design of the future boulevard from among the seven remaining participants. The design by the Berlin offices Graft and ART+COM was unanimously chosen as the winner. Around one million euros are available for the realisation of the project; the money comes primarily from EU economic development funds. The non-profit organisation "Boulevard of the Stars GmbH", headed by Georgia Tornow, will be responsible for the maintenance costs in the future . The costs are to be covered primarily through donations.

Since the median strip of Potsdamer Straße was declared in the 2003 Urban Development Plan for Transport of the City of Berlin as a route clearance for the planned tram line towards the Kulturforum, according to the passenger association IGEB, this is therefore a temporary location for the artwork. The Urban Development Plan for Transport, amended on March 29, 2011, provides for the implementation of the construction measures starting in 2014.

Due to increasing pollution and aesthetic reasons, the square came under criticism in 2013:

"The 'Boulevard der Stars' is a panopticon of shabbiness. An unsightly, unkempt stretch of median strip that one only voluntarily enters to quickly get to the other side of the street. If this boulevard is advertising, then it is merely for competing film locations." In August 2013, the authorities announced that the boulevard would be resurfaced. For this reason, the installation of ten new stars was postponed for a year in September 2013. On 4 September 2014, the renovated boulevard was finally reopened and 20 new stars were inaugurated for 2013 and 2014.

In 2015, the non-profit organization did not have enough money for an honor. Therefore, four more people were not honored until September 2016. These were the last stars to be added to the boulevard .

On March 31, 2018, parts of the boulevard were damaged or destroyed in a car accident. The star of comedian Anke Engelke was salvaged in a damaged condition. The red asphalt and the stars have not been maintained since then.

== Design ==
The stars are made of polished bronze and set into the Boulevard's red-colored asphalt surface. Each star is engraved with the name, occupation, personal details and signature of the honored personality.

Special Pepper's Ghost cameras have been installed on the avenue that project an image of each of the honored film stars through interactive mirrors. This allows visitors to take photos of themselves with the famous personality. The stars are illuminated at night, with the light varying for special occasions.

== Selection procedure and admission requirements ==
The annual selection of the personalities to be honored is the responsibility of a five-person jury, which is composed of one representative each from the Stiftung Deutsche Kinemathek, the Deutsche Filmakademie, the Kulturveranstaltungen des Bundes in Berlin (KBB), the Adolf-Grimme-Institut and the Friends of the Museum für Film und Fernsehen . In contrast to the Hollywood Walk of Fame, where anyone can submit nominations, only "organizations and institutions that have been demonstrably active in the field of film and television for more than three years" can submit nominations. A two-thirds majority in the jury is required for the acceptance of a candidate. Around seven to ten new personalities are to be honored annually, partly in spring and partly in autumn.
