= 28th Berlin International Film Festival =

1978 film festival in West Berlin, Germany

- Festival poster
- Opening film: Opening Night
- Closing film: Close Encounters of the Third Kind
- Location: West Berlin, Germany
- Founded: 1951
- Awards: Golden Bear: Ascensor; What Max Said; Las truchas
- Festival date: 22 February – 5 March 1978
- Website: Website

Berlin International Film Festival chronology
- 29th 27th

The 28th annual Berlin International Film Festival was held from 22 February to 5 March 1978. Director Wolf Donner successfully managed to shift the festival's date from June to February, a change which has remained ever since. This was the first year the festival was held in February. The festival opened with Opening Night by John Cassavetes and closed with Steven Spielberg's out of competition film Close Encounters of the Third Kind.

The jury awarded the Golden Bear to Spain for its contribution to the festival. The three Spanish films which were screened at the festival and won it were short film Ascensor directed by Tomás Muñoz and feature films What Max Said by Emilio Martínez Lázaro and Las truchas by José Luis García Sánchez.

A new section for children was introduced at the festival. The Part 2 of the retrospective dedicated to West German actress Marlene Dietrich was shown at the festival, as well as the retrospective called "Censorship – Banned German Films 1933-1945".

== Juries ==
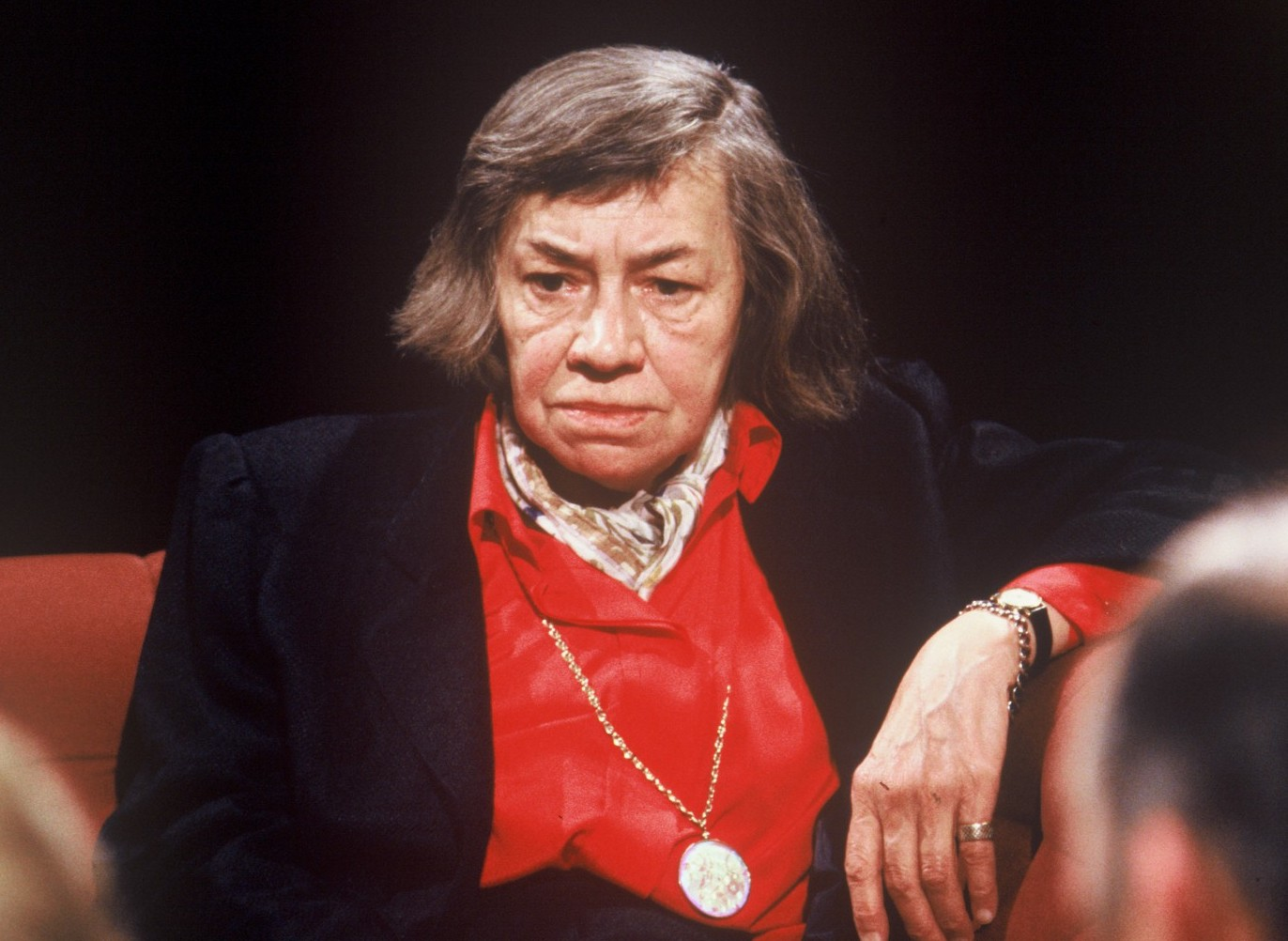
Patricia Highsmith, Jury President

The following people were announced as being on the jury for the festival:

=== Main Competition ===
- Patricia Highsmith, American writer - Jury President
- Sergio Leone, Italian filmmaker and producer
- Theodoros Angelopoulos, Greek filmmaker and producer
- Jacques Rozier, French filmmaker
- Konrad Wolf, East-German filmmaker
- Frieda Grafe, West-German essayist and film critic
- Antonio Eceiza, Spanish filmmaker
- Ana Carolina Teixeira Soares, Brazilian filmmaker
- Larisa Shepitko, Soviet filmmaker

== Official Sections ==
=== Main Competition ===
The following films were selected to compete for the Golden Bear award:

English title	Original title	Director(s)	Production Country
Advantage	Авантаж	Georgi Djulgerov	Bulgaria
A Night Full of Rain	La fine del mondo nel nostro solito letto in una notte piena di pioggia	Lina Wertmüller	Italy, United States
Ascensor		Tomás Muñoz	Spain
The Brothers Lionheart	Bröderna Lejonhjärta	Olle Hellbom	Sweden
The Chess Players	Shatranj Ke Khilari	Satyajit Ray	India
Co jsme udělali slepicím		Josef Hekrdle and Vladimír Jiránek	Czechoslovakia
The Contraption		James Dearden	United Kingdom
Death of a President	Śmierć prezydenta	Jerzy Kawalerowicz	Poland
The Dog Who Loved Trains	Pas koji je voleo vozove	Goran Paskaljević	Yugoslavia
The Fall	A Queda	Ruy Guerra and Nelson Xavier	Brazil
The Far Road	遠い一本の道	Sachiko Hidari	Japan
Flaming Hearts	Flammende Herzen	Walter Bockmayer and Rolf Bührmann	West Germany
Germany in Autumn	Deutschland im Herbst	Alf Brustellin, Hans Peter Cloos, Rainer Werner Fassbinder, Alexander Kluge, Beate Mainka-Jellinghaus, Maximiliane Mainka, Edgar Reitz, Katja Rupé, Volker Schlöndorff, Peter Schubert and Bernhard Sinkel	West Germany
Jörg Ratgeb – Painter	Jörg Ratgeb – Maler	Bernhard Stephan	East Germany
Lemon Popsicle	אסקימו לימון	Boaz Davidson	Israel
Lone Wolf	Бирю́к	Roman Balayan	Soviet Union
Moritz, Dear Moritz	Moritz, lieber Moritz	Hark Bohm	West Germany
My Father's Happy Years	Apám néhány boldog éve	Sándor Simó	Hungary
One Page of Love	Une page d'amour	Maurice Rabinowicz	Belgium, France
Opening Night		John Cassavetes	United States
Outrageous!		Richard Benner	Canada
Paper Flowers	Flores de papel	Gabriel Retes	Mexico
Rhinegold	Rheingold	Niklaus Schilling	West Germany
The Serpent's Egg		Ingmar Bergman	United States, West Germany
The Teacher	El brigadista	Octavio Cortázar	Cuba
Trout	Las truchas	José Luis García Sánchez	Spain
Une vieille soupière		Michel Longuet	France
What Max Said	La palabras de Max	Emilio Martínez-Lázaro	Spain

=== Out of competition ===
- Close Encounters of the Third Kind, directed by Steven Spielberg (United States)
- I Am the Law, directed by Pasquale Squitieri (Italy)
- Sextette, directed by Ken Hughes (United States)
- The Last Wave, directed by Peter Weir (Australia)

1978 Retrospective poster featuring Marlene Dietrich

=== Retrospective ===
The following films were shown in the retrospective dedicated to Marlene Dietrich (Part 2):

English title	Original title	Director(s)	Production Country
Angel		Ernst Lubitsch	United States
Black Fox: The Rise and Fall of Adolf Hitler		Louis Clyde Stoumen	United States
Desire		Frank Borzage	United States
Destry Rides Again		George Marshall	United States
The Flame of New Orleans		René Clair	United States
The Garden of Allah		Richard Boleslawski	United States
Kismet		William Dieterle	United States
Leap Into Life	Der Sprung ins Leben	Johannes Guter	Germany
The Woman One Longs For	Die Frau, nach der man sich sehnt	Curtis Bernhardt	Germany
No Highway in the Sky		Henry Koster	United Kingdom
Rancho Notorious		Fritz Lang	United States
Touch of Evil		Orson Welles	United States

== Official Awards ==
The following prizes were awarded by the Jury:

- Golden Bear:
  - What Max Said by Emilio Martínez Lázaro
  - Las truchas by José Luis García Sánchez
  - Ascensor by Tomás Muñoz (short film)
- Silver Bear – Special Jury Prize: A Queda by Ruy Guerra, Nelson Xavier
- Silver Bear for Best Director: Georgi Djulgerov for Advantage
- Silver Bear for Best Actress: Gena Rowlands for Opening Night
- Silver Bear for Best Actor: Craig Russell for Outrageous!
- Silver Bear for an outstanding artistic contribution:
  - Death of a President by Jerzy Kawalerowicz
  - The Teacher by Octavio Cortázar
- Special Recognition: Germany in Autumn

== Independent Awards ==
=== FIPRESCI Award ===
- My Father's Happy Years by Sándor Simó
