= Las truchas =

Trout
- Theatrical release poster
- Spanish: Las truchas
- Directed by: José Luis García Sánchez
- Screenplay by: José Luis García Sánchez; Manuel Gutiérrez Aragón; Luis Megino Grande
- Produced by: Luis Megino
- Cinematography: Magín Torruella
- Edited by: Eduardo Biurrun
- Music by: Víctor Manuel
- Production company: Arándano
- Release dates: 25 February 1978 (Berlinale); 1 April 1978 (Spain)
- Running time: 99 minutes
- Country: Spain
- Language: Spanish

Trout (Spanish: Las truchas) is a 1978 Spanish film directed by José Luis García Sánchez. The film was entered into the 28th Berlin International Film Festival, where it won the Golden Bear.

== Plot ==
A satirization of middle class society under the rule of Franco, the plot concerns about an annual dinner of a fishing club whose members eat rotten trout while refusing to accept that there is a problem with it.

== Cast ==
- Héctor Alterio as Gonzalo
- Juan Amigo as Emiliano
- Francisco Casares as Camarero
- Luis Ciges as Militante de Cruz Roja
- Roberto Font as Sebastian
- Manuel Huete as Adolfo
- Lautaro Murúa as Presidente
- Antonio Passy as Camarero
- Luis Politti as Don Jose Maria
- Kino Pueyo as Cocinero (as Quino Pueyo)
- Antonio Requena as Antonio
- Juan Sala as Antonio Gallifa
- Alfonso Vallejo as Alfonso
- Juan Jesús Valverde as Juan Alberto
- María Elena Flores
- Fernando Chinarro
- Ofelia Angélica
- Carmen Arévalo
- Mary Carrillo
- Antonio Gamero
- Paloma Hurtado
- Walter Vidarte
- Raúl Pazos
- Yelena Samarina
- Verónica Forqué

== Release ==
The film was presented at the 28th Berlin International Film Festival in February 1978. It was theatrically released in Spain on 1 April 1978. It grossed 31,244,437 ₧ (263,375 admissions).

== See also ==
- List of Spanish films of 1978
