= Oscar Martay =

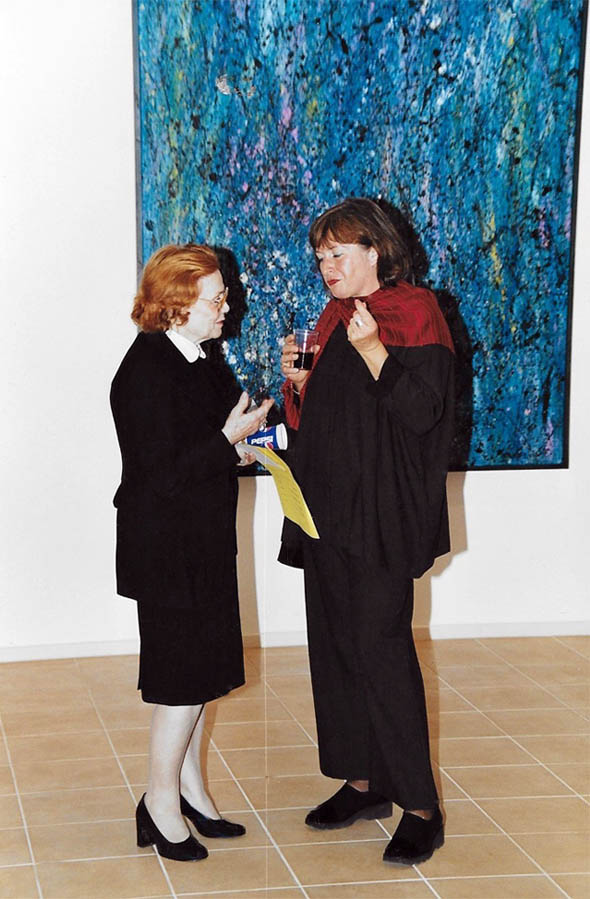
Ingeborg Martay (Renate Barken) and visitor. Exhibition opening of the artist Rengha Rodewill, Berlin-Mitte (2000)

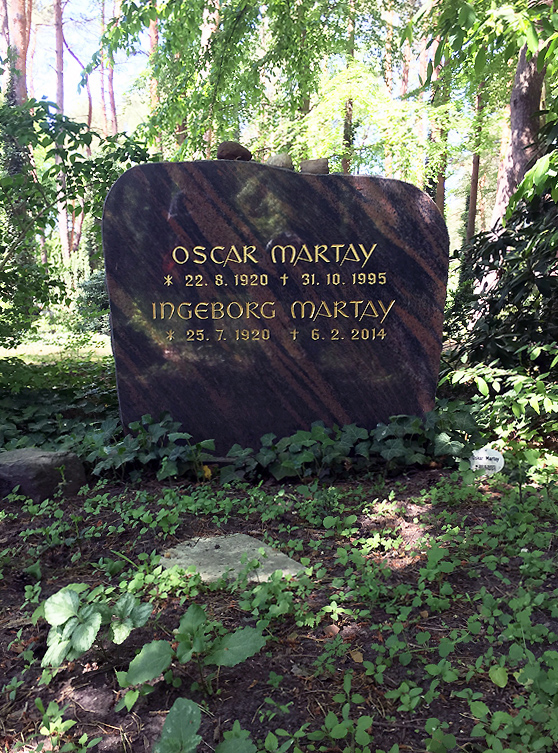
Grave of Oscar and Ingeborg Martay on the Waldfriedhof Berlin-Zehlendorf (Zehlendorf forest cemetery) (2018)

Oscar Martay (August 22, 1920 in Stowbtsy, Belarus - October 31, 1995 Berlin, Germany) was the person who, through his role of a film officer of the US Army, proposed the idea and used his influence to persuade the American Military to fund the Berlin International Film Festival (Berlinale) which was founded in 1951.

During the peak of the Cold War in 1950, Oscar Martay, who was stationed in Berlin as a film officer of the Information Service Branch of the American High Commissioner for Germany, suggested the foundation of the Berlin International Film Festival. The proposal was put through a committee including members of the Senate of Berlin and people from the German film industry on October 9, 1950. Through his efforts and influence, the American military administration was persuaded to assist and to give loans for the first years of the Berlinale which held the first festival in June 1951.

The Berlinale recognized his role and he was one of the people who received the Golden Bear award in 1951.

When Martay left the Army, he worked in film production in Germany. His wife Ingeborg founded the film company Zenit-Film Ingeborg Martay (Berlin/West) in 1957. Oscar Martay worked as a production manager.

== Personal life ==
As a Jewish emigrant, he lived in the US and was sent to Germany after World War II as a film officer. In 1955, Oscar Martay marries Renate Barken (1920–2014), a German actress. He dies in 1995. They have 2 sons, Kenneth Andreas (1956) is an associate professor of anesthesiology at the University of Washington, and Manuel (1960) is a social worker living in Germany. Oscar and Ingeborg Martay are buried in the Waldfriedhof Zehlendorf Berlin Germany.
