= Ascensor =

1978 film

- Directed by: Tomás Muñoz
- Written by: Tomás Daussa; Pedro Muñoz
- Starring: Armando Aguirre
- Cinematography: Carles Gusi
- Release date: 1 May 1978
- Running time: 11 minutes
- Country: Spain
- Language: Spanish

Ascensor is a 1978 short Spanish film directed by Tomás Muñoz. It was entered into the 28th Berlin International Film Festival, where it won the Golden Bear.

== Plot ==
A group of four strangers are stranded together in an elevator.

== Cast ==
- Armando Aguirre
- Antonio Lara
- Miguel Moncho
- Maria Luisa Oliveda
- Juan Subatella
