= José Luis García Sánchez =

Spanish film director (1941–2026)

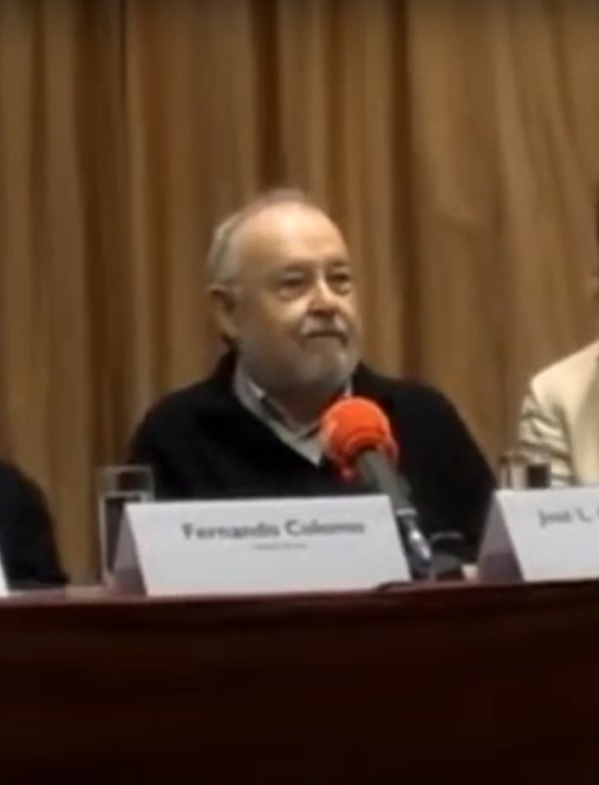
- Born: 22 September 1941; Salamanca, Spain
- Died: 25 October 2026 (aged 85)
- Occupations: Film director; producer; screenwriter
- Children: Víctor García León

José Luis García Sánchez (22 September 1941 – 25 October 2026) was a Spanish film director, producer and screenwriter. He has directed 30 films since 1968. He wrote for the 1973 film Habla, mudita, which was entered into the 23rd Berlin International Film Festival. In 1978, he directed Las truchas ("Trouts"), which won the Golden Bear at the 28th Berlin International Film Festival.

García died on 25 October 2026, at the age of 85.

He was the father of filmmaker Víctor García León.

== Selected filmography ==
- Habla, mudita (1973)
- Las truchas (1978)
- Hay que deshacer la casa (1983)
- La corte de Faraón (1985)
- Divinas palabras (1987)
- Pasodoble (1988)
- The Flight of the Dove (1989)
- La noche más larga (1991)
- Belle Époque (1992)
- Tramway to Malvarrosa (Tranvía a la Malvarrosa) (1997)
- Lázaro de Tormes (2001)
- La marcha verde (2002)
- María querida (2004)
