= What Max Said =

1978 Spanish film by Emilio Martínez Lázaro

- Directed by: Emilio Martínez Lázaro
- Release dates: February 1978 (BIFF); 1 June 1978 (Spain)
- Running time: 97 minutes
- Country: Spain
- Language: Spanish

What Max Said (Spanish: Las palabras de Max) is a 1978 Spanish film directed by Emilio Martínez Lázaro, and starring Ignacio Fernández de Castro, Myriam De Maeztu and Gracia Querejeta. It tells the story of a man who feels disconnected from people around him. It was entered into the 28th Berlin International Film Festival where it won the Golden Bear.

== Cast ==
- Héctor Alterio
- Maria De la Riva - Jacoba
- Myriam De Maeztu
- Ignacio Fernández de Castro
- Gracia Querejeta
- Raúl Sender
- Cecilia Viuarrean
