= Fanny Westerdahl =

Swedish actress

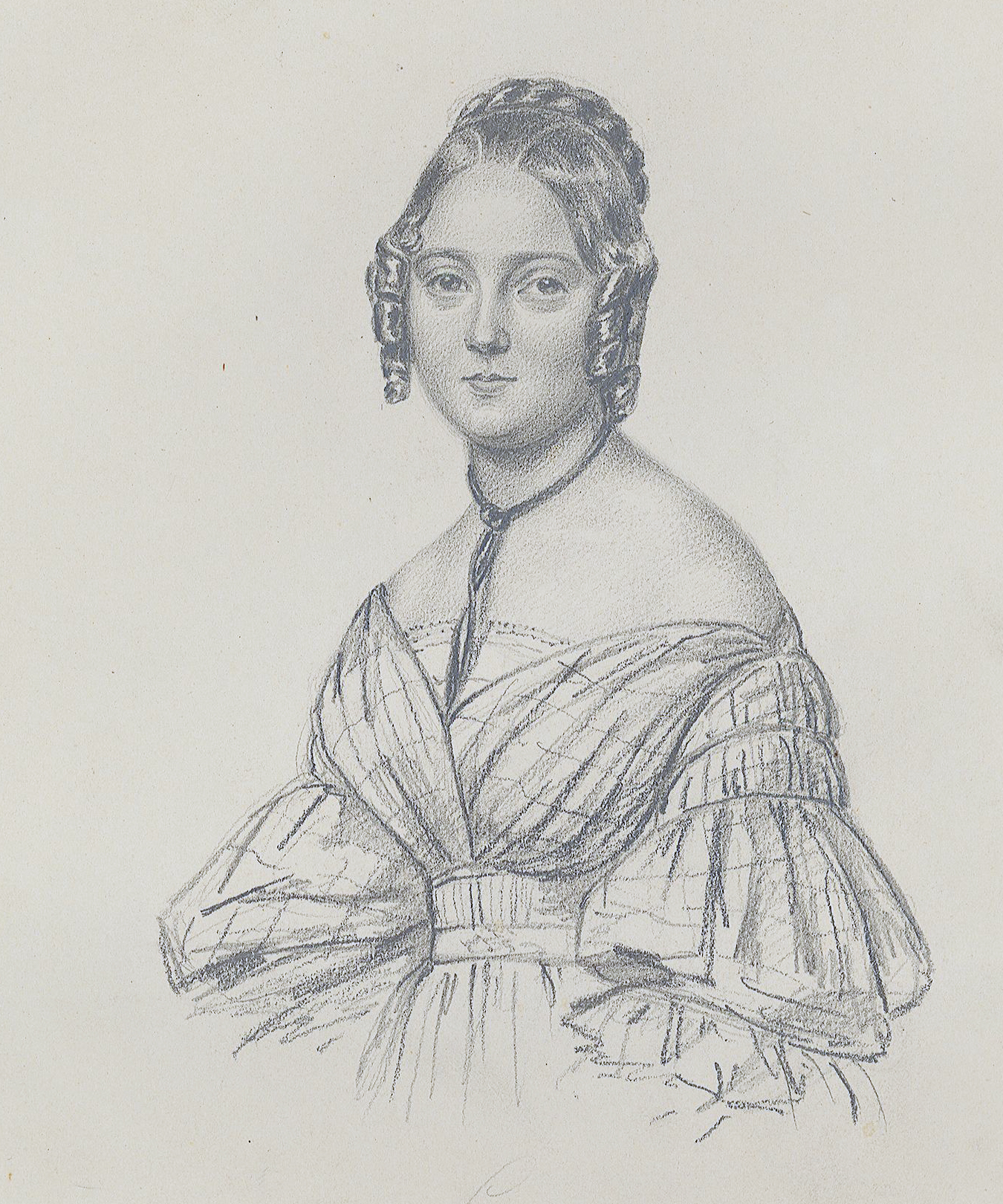
- Fanny Westerdahl by Maria Röhl
- Born: Fanny Amalia Westerdahl; 21 February 1817; Stockholm, Sweden
- Died: 27 March 1873 (aged 56); Stockholm, Sweden
- Other name: Fanny Hjortsberg
- Spouse: Carl Edvard Hjortsberg

Fanny Amalia Westerdahl or Fanny Hjortsberg (21 February 1817 – 27 March 1873) was a Swedish stage actress, active between 1829 and 1862. She is also known to have performed in some opera performances. She belonged to the elite actresses at the Royal Dramatic Theatre of mid-19th-century Sweden.

== Life ==
Fanny Westerdahl was born in Stockholm, Sweden, on 21 February 1817. She was the daughter of a concert conductor at the Hovkapellet. She was enrolled as a student at the Royal Dramatic Training Academy in 1828.

=== Career ===
Fanny Westerdahl was engaged at the Royal Dramatic Theatre in 1829 (at age 12) and made her proper debut in 1831, as "Carolina" in Baschan in Suresne. In 1836, she was contracted as a premier actress. In the beginning of her career, she was considered to have in some extent replaced Sara Torsslow on the royal stage.

Fanny Westerdahl was described as beautiful, with a good technique in managing her voice in both speaking and lyric drama, a quick and skillful mimic, and a good comprehension of the character of her roles. In 1849, she was referred to as the only one of the actresses of the royal stage truly suited for "great drama" and praised her for her natural warmth and "mild passion". She took her profession seriously, and made a study trip to Paris to study the French theater in 1838. A known incident was told of her improvisation skill on stage. During a performance in which she played a bandit, she was to shoot her co-actor Georg Dahlqvist, but when the gun did not work as it should, she hit him with it, which caused him to faint for real. When he came to, he commented: "You are sublime!"

Fanny Westerdahl was a dramatic actress, but as was common at the time when the royal opera and theater where both placed under the same management as the "royal theaters", singers and actors were allowed and expected to be available for both genres providing they had the ability, and Westerdahl is known to have occasionally performed an operatic part, such as when she replaced Elisabeth Frösslind in Cendrillon.

Westerdahl belonged to the elite of dramatic actors on the Swedish stage of her time. Her position was illustrated by her salary: in 1843, she had a salary of 1400 riksdaler, which was only marginally less than the stars Emilie Högquist and Nils Almlöf (who had 1600) and the same amount as the Ballet master of Royal Swedish Ballet, Anders Selinder.

By 1858, Westerdahl was considered an example of the outdated old recitative way of acting. When she wished to play one of her old heroine parts, she was told: "Madam is too old!" At this point, she was described as overweight, a drunk and with a frivolous mouth, but talented in comedy, and she was recommended by August Bournonville as an example of good instinct and fantasy in contrast to mere education. Fanny Westerdahl formally retired with a pension in 1862, but was active as a guest actor for several years afterwards.

Her best-known roles include: "Louise" in Kabal and Kärlek, "Johanna af Montfaucon" or "Griselda", Amalia in Röfvarbandet, and "Katarina Månsdotter" in Erik XIV. Her singing roles include "Cendrillon" and "Papagena" in Trollflöyten, and "Bettly" in Alphyddan.

== Private life ==
Fanny Westerdahl married the actor Carl Edvard Hjortsberg (son of Lars Hjortsberg) in 1847, and divorced him in 1849. After her divorce, she called herself Mrs Westerdahl.

Fanny Westerdahl died in Stockholm, on 27 March 1873.
