= Ulrik Torsslow =

Swedish actor and director

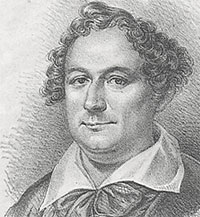
- Lithography 1847
- Born: Olof Ulrik Torsslow; 18 December 1801; Stockholm, Sweden
- Died: 1 September 1881 (aged 79)
- Occupations: Actor and theatre director
- Known for: Led two big strikes to end royal theater monopoly

Olof Ulrik Torsslow (18 December 1801 in Stockholm – 1 September 1881 in Stockholm), was a Swedish actor and theatre director. He was an elite actor in the Royal Dramatic Theatre. He is known for leading two big strikes at the royal stage, referred to as the 'First Torsslow Argument' (1827) and 'Second Torsslow Argument' (1834), and for crushing the monopoly of the royal theaters in Stockholm in 1842. He was the director of the Mindre teatern.

== Life ==
Ulrik Torsslow was born to bank official Mattias Torsslow. He was a student at the Royal Dramatic Training Academy in 1816–19 and made his debut as Hamlet on the Royal Dramatic Theatre in 1819, where he stayed until the great strike of 1834.

In 1830, he married the actress Sara Torsslow.

=== The Torsslow Arguments ===
In 1827 and 1834, two major strikes - indeed, the biggest strikes in the theatre's history - took place in the "Royal Theaters" (the Royal Swedish Opera and the Royal Dramatic Theatre), referred to as 'First Torsslow Argument' (1827) and 'Second Torsslow Argument' (1834) after the leading figures, Ulrik Torsslow and Sara Torsslow.

In 1827, director Karl Johan Puke introduced reforms in which the benefit performances of the actors (in which the entire income from a performance was given to one of the actors) and the actors' share in the theater was to be replaced by fixed salaries. The majority of the actors rejected both of these reforms, as benefit performances were normally much more lucrative for the majority of actors: furthermore, Puke made himself immensely disliked by frequent use of disciplinary rules, such as the right of a director to place an actor in arrest in their dressing room. The Torsslow couple, in their position as star actors, launched a strike in which they demanded the reforms be stopped and the disciplinarian rules abolished. The strike successfully prevented the financial reforms, but the disciplinarian rules were kept, with the exception of the arrest, which was abolished for women. The discontent of the disciplinarian system was voiced by Elise Frösslind, who, when director Puke asked her if she was satisfied with the settlement, replied: "Oh yes, the only thing missing is the flogging."

The plans to introduce the reforms were, however, continued indefinitely, and the second strike of 1834 voiced the same concerns. This time, the management was prepared for the strike and crushed the unity of the participants by raising the salaries of some and firing others.

The second strike was therefore defeated, which resulted in the introduction of the reforms, while the participants of the strike were dismissed. Some of the participants, however, were only fired so that they could be hired again for a lower salary, which was illustrated in the cases of the star actors Elise Frösslind and Charlotta Eriksson, who were both fired with the formal motivation that Frösslind was claimed to be too old and of delicate health to fill her obligations and Eriksson simply because they could no longer afford her. When they were fired, the director admitted informally that they had been so because of their participation in the strike, though he gave other official reasons.

=== Later career ===
Ulrik and Sara Torsslow left the Royal Dramatic Theatre after the strike of 1834, bringing with them a number of leading actors. However, the theater monopoly of 1798 was still in effect in the city of Stockholm, which reserved all professional theatrical activity inside the city borders of Stockholm for the royal theaters. This resulted in the actors needing help finding employment in the city. Eventually, several of them were forced to ask to return to the Royal Dramatic Theatre, which accepted them back with a lower salary than before the strike: this was, for example, the case with both Elise Frösslind and Charlotta Eriksson, who returned in 1836. Ulrik and Sara Torsslow initiated a struggle against the royal theater monopoly of 1798, which lasted for eight years and eventually resulted in its abolition.

Initially, they were engaged at the Djurgårdsteatern, a theater which was not regarded as illegal because, firstly, it lay just outside of the city borders and, secondly, it had, until that point, only been used during the summers. In 1835–37 he was director for Djurgårdsteatern, where he broke the royal theatre's monopoly in 1842 (until 1837 in companionship with Pierre Deland).

The Torsslows bought the special permit for the theater from Pierre Deland and initially performed there only during the summers and toured the country in winter, but from the 1839 season; they also challenged the theater monopoly by performing in winter. Their initiative was successful, and they created theater history when the theater monopoly, which was regarded outdated by then, was abolished in 1842.

From 1835 to 1839, he toured with his own troupe, and from 1843 to 1856, he was employed at the theatre Mindre Teatern in Stockholm, where he was director from 1846 to 1850 (solo from 1850 onwards). Ulrik and Sara Torsslow enjoyed a renewed golden age of their careers at the Mindre teatern, where they were praised by critics as "were the spouses during the tenure of a few years united to a Twin Pair of the First Order in the Sky of Art."

He returned to the Royal Dramatic Theatre in 1856 and made his last performance in 1863.
