= Elise Frösslind =

Swedish opera singer (1793–1861)

Elisabeth Frösslind
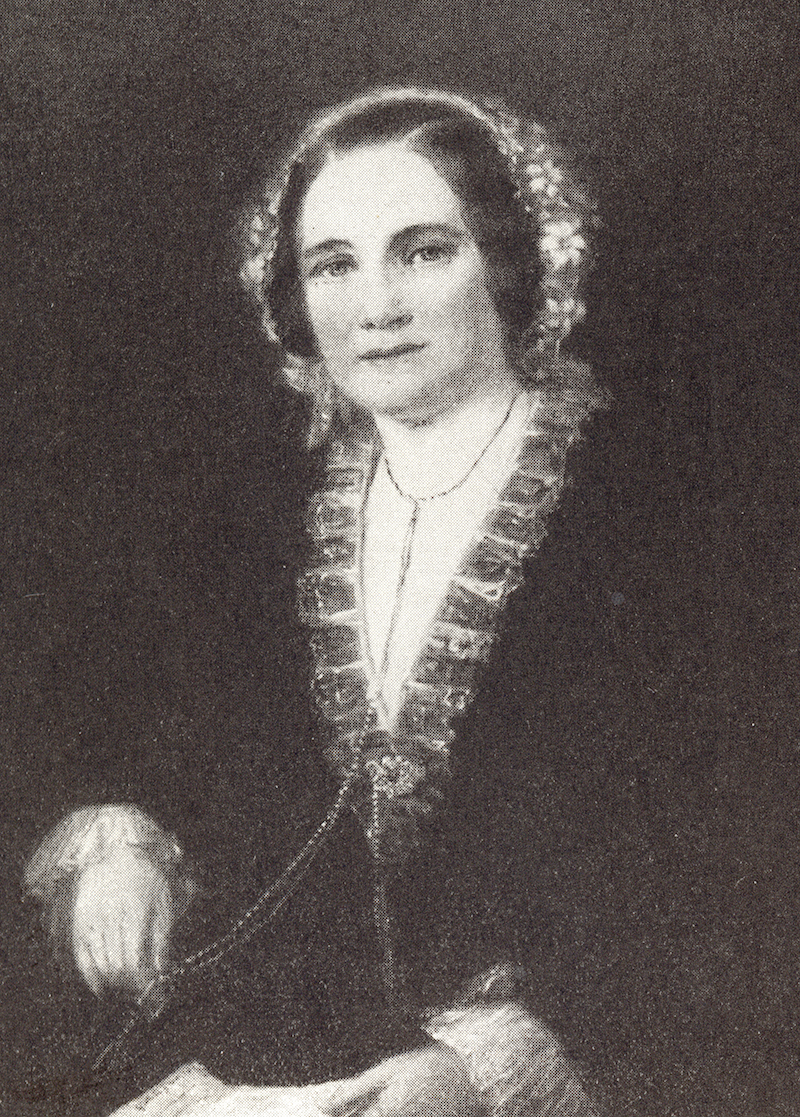
- Oil painting by M. K. Cardon
- Born: Elisabeth Kristina Frösslind; 27 February 1793; Sweden
- Died: 24 October 1861 (aged 68); Sweden
- Other names: Elise Frösslind, Elisabeth Lindström.
- Spouse: Carl Gustaf Lindström

Kristina Elisabet "Elise" Frösslind (27 February 1793 – 24 October 1861) was a Swedish opera singer and stage actress at the Royal Swedish Opera and the Royal Dramatic Theatre in Stockholm. She was a member of the Royal Swedish Academy of Music (1817). She was known as a member of the elite of Swedish stage actors at the time: as a singer, she was compared to Henriette Widerberg, and as an actress, she was mentioned alongside Charlotta Eriksson and Sara Torsslow.

== Life ==
Elise Frösslind was the daughter of the firefighter Anders Frösslind (d. 1804) and Christina Ulvin and the only daughter of three children. She married Carl Gustaf Lindström with whom she had two sons and three daughters, notably the actress Emelie Frösslind.

=== Education ===
Frösslind came from a poor home and was enrolled in the singing school of the Royal Swedish Opera by her mother after the death of her father, at the age of eleven. She was housed in the student home of Sofia Lovisa Gråå, and became the student of Karl August Steiler.

She was initially placed in the choir with Anna Sofia Sevelin and Justina Casagli, but when director Anders Fredrik Skjöldebrand heard them sing, he transferred them from the choir to avoid damage on their voices and arranged for them to be trained for opera roles instead.

Frösslind, Sevelin and Casagli were instructed by the choir master and singing instructor Johan Fredrik Wikström. Director Skjöldebrand described how he came to take an interest in Frösslind by an incident known in the history of the royal theater. It had come to the attention of the director, that Johan Fredrik Wikström abused Frösslind, Sevelin and Casagli, upon which he questioned them to find out the truth. The other girls chose Frösslind as their spokesperson, and director Skjöldebrand pretended to take the side of Wikström in order to observe how she would present her defense in gesture, tone and phrase, and was moved by her speech:

"We are poor girls, taken from misery, what hope have we for the future, if we do not take the opportunity to learn all we can? But we try as hard as we can, and still when his in a bad mind he beats us, if I dare say, without cause. Out of this we lose our courage, become doubtful and what is worse lose the hope and the pleasure to learn."

Director Skjöldenbrand ended the affair with the dismissal of Wikström in his capacity as a song master with a reprimand of his lack of self-control and replaced him with Karl Magnus Craelius (teacher of Jenny Lind), under whose more kind guidance they made better progress. These girls were all to become famous: Frösslind and Sevelin nationally, and Justina Casagli internationally.

=== Career ===
Elise Frösslind made her debut in the title role of the opera Cendrillon by Nicolo Isouard on the Royal Swedish Opera 23 February 1811. She had been given the role by director Skjöldenbrand among great opposition from the established actors. That year, the opera had been brought back from Paris with Gustav Åbergsson and Carolina Kuhlman, who had excepted to play the role: "An actor of the higher comedy, Mr Åbergsson, had in the company of his mistress, an excellent actress in her own right, who were later to become his wife, went to Paris to develop himself in his profession", and brought the new play of Cendrillon with them, with Åbergsson demanding that the title role be given to Kuhlman, and it caused controversy that a student was given such a big role in the premier of a new opera on her debut by the director. The star actor Lars Hjortsberg was sent as a spokesperson to the director to criticize him for giving such a role to a "Little Goose" like Frösslind, and upon the opening night, the cast reportedly said: "Now we'll see the Goose, it'll be so interesting to see the Goose!"

Despite the doubts, Elise Frösslind in the role of Cendrillon became a legendary success which was described as unsurpassed until the debut of Jenny Lind: she was considered perfect for the part, she performed in the role of Cendrillon about seventy times over two decades, establishing her as one of the stars of the Swedish opera.

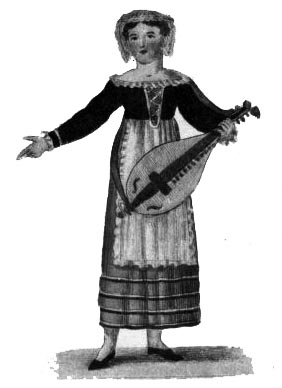
Elise Lindström as Fanchon.

Her performance of Cendrillon was also controversial because it created a debate about the new way of acting illustrated by Elise Frösslind, in which the so-called "natural acting" replaced the old stylistic way of acting, and Frösslind came to represent the new style and seen as a perfect example of it: the debate ended when the journal Journal för litteraturen och theatern ('Journal of Literature and Theater') was forced to apologize to Frösslind for initially giving her negative critic. The new style of acting in which she was said to excel was to act with "truthfulness, nature and naivety". The journalist Nils Arfvidsson described her ability:

"The tender and intense was portrayed by her with as much truth and art as the witty, naive, energetic, and still in the foolish, stupid and boorish, she was :excellent. The noble, dignifying, as long as it belonged to the higher levels of comedy and did not necessitate resources of tragedy, also found an able and :successful interpreter in her. Taste and feeling followed her in every part."

In contemporary press, the star actresses Sara Torsslow, Charlotta Eriksson and Elise Frösslind were compared to a rose or a tulip, a jasmine or a daisy, and a lily or a forget-me-not, by which Torsslow was claimed to represent "The Deeply Moving", Eriksson "The Sensitive Grace and Feminine Gracefulness" and Frösslind "The Timid Sweetness, Wit and Naivety". Her position is illustrated by the fact that she was seen as a role model for the later world-famous Jenny Lind. The paper Freja described her ability as restricted but with few competitors in Europe within it, and commented in the autumn of 1836 that it was "a pleasure to see, that Miss Lind shows signs in her improvement which my one day able her to replace the in her genre always unsurpassed Mrs Frösslind."

Among her other operatic parts were Antigone in Oedip by Adlerbeth, Doristella in Griselda, Anna in Friskytten (The Marksman) by Weber, Zerlina in Don Giovanni by Mozart, Cherubin in Figaro and Fanchon in Fanchon. Until the mid-19th century, when the Royal Swedish Opera and the Royal Dramatic Theater was united as the 'Royal Theatres', it was not uncommon for stageartists to perform in both operatic and dramatic parts if they had the ability to do so, and Elise Frösslind is known to have performed also as an actress. Among her talking parts were Louise in Louise och Walborn (Louise and Walborn) and Madame Pinchon in Passionen och förnuftet (Passion and sense) by Scribe.

As a person, Frösslind was described as an intelligent and humble character, unaffected by flattery and diligently and successfully developing her artistic talent.

In 1813, Elise Frösslind married her colleague, the operatic tenor hovsångare Carl Gustaf Lindström, "First actor and singer at the opera and the Dramatic theatre", with whom she had five children. Her spouse was successful and often paired with her in the opera, but his financial difficulties resulted in him being placed under legal guardianship in 1831: Elise Frösslind divorced him the same year, and as was common after a divorce, she took back her original name but used the title Mrs, calling herself Mrs Frösslind.

=== The Torsslow Arguments ===
In 1827 and 1834, two major strikes took place in the "Royal Theaters" (the Royal Swedish Opera and the Royal Dramatic Theatre), referred to as 'First Torsslow Argument' (1827) and 'Second Torsslow Argument' (1834) after the leading figures, Ulrik Torsslow and Sara Torsslow. Elise Frösslind actively participated in both strikes, which came to have in impact in her career.

In 1827, director Karl Johan Puke introduced reforms in which the benefit performances of the actors (in which the entire income from a performance was given to one of the actors) and the actors' share in the theater was to be replaced by fixed salaries. Both of these reforms was rejected by the majority of the actors, as benefit performances was normally much more lucrative for the majority of actors: further more, Puke made himself immensely disliked by a frequent use of disciplinary rules, such as the right of a director to place an actor in arrest in their dressing room. The Torsslow couple, in their position of star actors, launched a strike in which they demanded the reforms be stopped and the disciplinarian rules abolished. The strike successfully prevented the financial reforms, but the disciplinarian rules were kept with the exception of the arrest, which was abolished for women. The discontent of the disciplinarian system was voiced by Elise Frösslind who, when director Puke asked her if she was satisfied with the settlement replied: "Oh yes, the only thing missing is the flogging."

The plans to introduced the reforms was however not terminated indefinitely, and the second strike of 1834 voiced the same concerns. This time, the management was prepared for the strike and crushed the unity of the participants by raising the salaries of some and firing others. The second strike was therefore defeated, which resulting in the introduction of the reforms, while the participants of the strike was dismissed. Some of the participants, however, were only fired so that they could be hired again for a lower salary, which was illustrated in the cases of the star actors Elise Frösslind and Charlotta Eriksson, who were both fired with the formal motivation that Frösslind was claimed to be too old and of delicate health to fill her obligations, and Eriksson simply because they could no longer afford her. However, both were granted pensions on the condition that they were to be available if they were needed. Further more, during the monopoly of the Royal theaters within the city borders of the capital, they could not find any other employment in Stockholm. When this prompted them to ask to come back in 1836, they were immediately accepted, with a lowered salary. When they were fired, the director admitted informally that they had been so because of their participation in the strike, though he gave other official reasons. This was also illustrated upon their return: while the official reason to fire Frösslind had been her age, she was still given girls' roles upon her return, among them the part of Zeltubé, in which she was described as "unprecedentedly pleasant, sweet and graceful".

=== Later life ===
The career of Elise Frösslind deteriorated after 1835, when her operatic roles were taken over by Jenny Lind and her dramatic by Emilie Högquist, and her roles grew smaller. In 1836, she introduced the Tableau vivant on the Royal Dramatic theater. When she was ill and unable to perform during the 1840–41 season, her colleagues gave a benefit performance to her support at the Kirsteinska huset. Not much is known of her private life, but she supported her five children alone after her divorce, and seems to have been well liked by her colleagues. She is noted to have been a personal friend of Emilie Högquist: she spent the Christmas of 1844 with her, and frequented her literary salon, which was otherwise avoided by women because of Högquists reputation as a courtesan.

She made her last performance on 7 November 1845 and retired with a modest pension. She is believed to have died of uterine cancer.
