= Charlotta Eriksson =

Swedish stage actress (1794–1862)

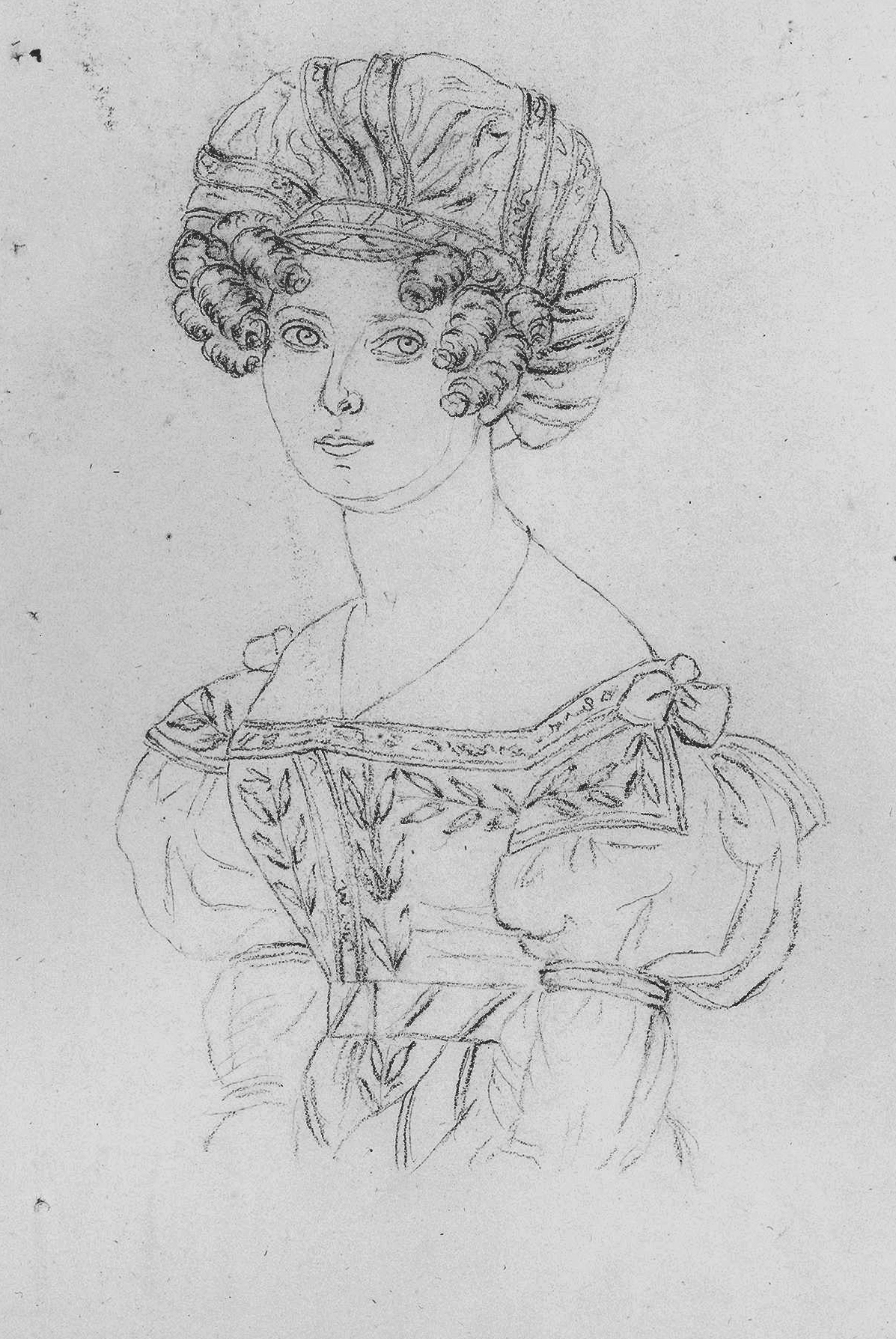
- Drawing by Maria Röhl 1832
- Born: Charlotta Maria Lambert; 11 February 1794; Stockholm, Sweden
- Died: 21 April 1862 (aged 68); Düsseldorf, Germany
- Other name: Charlotta Wikström
- Spouse: Johan Fredrik Wikström

Charlotta Maria Eriksson (née Lambert; 11 February 1794 – 21 April 1862) was a Swedish stage actress. She was also an instructor and deputy principal of the Royal Dramatic Training Academy. She belonged to the elite actors of the Royal Dramatic Theatre.

== Life ==
Charlotta Eriksson was the natural daughter of Christina Halling. Her original surname was Lambert, and is traditionally claimed to be the daughter of an innkeeper with the surname Lambert, but her father is likely to have been P. J. Lambert, concert master of the theater, to whom her mother worked as a maid by the time of her birth. In 1797 her mother married Emanuel Ericsson, a servant of the royal household and later a pad maker, and Charlotta took the name of her stepfather.

She was enrolled as a student in the Royal Dramatic Training Academy in 1805.

=== Career at the Royal Dramatic Theatre ===
Charlotta Eriksson was engaged as a premier actress at the Royal Dramatic Theatre 1 April 1812. The same year, she married Johan Fredrik Wikström (1779-1865), master of the choir of the Royal Swedish Opera, and was known as Charlotta Wikström until her divorce in 1821 when she, in accordance with the custom of divorced women at the time, took the name and title of Mrs Eriksson. The cause of her divorce was her wish to marry her lover, the actor Edvard du Puy, whose death in 1822 caused her to temporary retire from the stage in the spring and summer that year.

Charlotta Eriksson was foremost a dramatic actress. However, as was the custom at the time of the royal theatres (the Royal Swedish Opera and the Royal Dramatic Theatre), an actor could participate in lyric performances if they were able, and Eriksson is known to have participated in some opera performances, notably as a Papagena in Trollflöjten by Mozart (30 maj 1812).

One of her first successes was in 1820, when she played Ophelia instead of Carolina Kuhlman and praised for her realistic interpretation of insanity. In May 1821, Charlotta Eriksson had one of her greatest successes when she played the title role in the Swedish premier of Mary Stuart by Schiller, and are referred to as one of the greatest stars of the Royal Dramatic Theatre of her generation alongside Nils Almlöf, Ulrik Torsslow and Sara Torsslow. Among her more noted roles were Beata Trolle in P. A. Granbergs Svante Sture och Märta Lejonhufvud (1812), Sally in Hartford och Sally by Zschokke (1814), Sofia in A. F. Skjöldebrands Herman von Unna (1817) and one of the norns in Balder by J. D. Valerius (1819), the title role of Preciosa by Weber-Wolffs (1824) and Ophelia in Hamlet (1824), Luise in Schillers Kabal och kärlek (1833), title role of Thérése eller den fader- och moderlösa flickan från Geneve by V. Ducange (1820), Berta örindur in Adolf Müllners Skulden (1830). A role often mentioned in connection to her, and which made a great impression in the audience, was her role in Sömngångaren ('Sleepwalker') by Piccini, in which she walked, talked and finally danced without showing any feelings whatsoever, in an interpretation of a sleepwalker.

Charlotta Eriksson was foremost appreciated within the genre of French salon comedies, a very popular genre at the time in which she was often given the main women roles and performed them with success, becoming a star of the genre. A typical role of that kind was her role of Amelie inTrettio år af en spelares lefnad ('Thirty years of a gamlers life') by Ducange and Dinaux (1833), in which she was reviewed in Aftonbladet: »Mrs E. developed more warmth, intensity and nuance as Amelie than normally found in her in roles of pathetic nature, and was as interesting in every aspect of it without being alike in one."

As an actor, Eriksson was described as a follower of the by then newly introduced realistic way of acting: because she lacked the ability to perform with the old fashioned melodramatic way in which such roles were still depicted, she was not considered to be of use within tragedy, but her natural way of acting was seen as perfect for the modern acting method, which was then very much appreciated within comic drama. She made several trips to study drama in France and Italy, where she reportedly regarded Mademoiselle Mars as a role model, and she is alongside Sara Torsslow, Ulrik Torsslow and Nils Almlöf credited with being one of the role models of the realistic acting method which replaced the old 18th-century stylistic acting method in 19th-century Sweden.

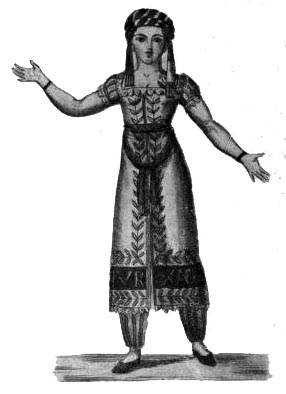
Charlotta Erikson as Preciosa.

Described as "a clear and above all vivid intellect, an uncommon general knowledge and a by then unusually natural way of acting, which in combination with an appearance very much to her advantage and high quality sense of costume made her much appreciated by the audience as a cultivated lady within salon comedy." She was generally given good reviews by critics, which were fairly consistent with each other her entire career. A typical review was that given in Dagligt Allehanda of her performance in the title role of Louise de Lignerolles by av Dinaux and Légouvé (1839), she was seen as typifying the modern style and as a role model for it: "As for the acting, we do full justice to the admirable way in which Mrs E performed the title role. In it she displayed all the qualities which typifies the French or more correctly the Marsian school which even in the most intense moments never neglect confidence and elegance in posture, and an acting, studied and skillfully performed in the finest nuances but still so natural that hardly even a trace was visible of any conscious effort. In these parts of the art Mrs E deserve to be hold out as a role model." Private critics review her in a similar way. Marianne Ehrenström described Charlotta Eriksson as a woman with natural grace who was much loved as an actress, and M. J. Crusenstolpe said of her: "Mrs E. can be photographically painted with one word: elegance. It passed through her entire being, expressed itself in her every gesture, was evident in her dress, always new but never overloaded with ostentation and gewgaw."

In contemporary press, the star actresses Sara Torsslow, Charlotta Eriksson and Elise Frösslind were compared to a rose or a tulip, a jasmine or a daisy, and a lily or a forget-me-not, by which Torsslow was claimed to represent "The Deeply Moving", Eriksson "The Sensitive Grace and Feminine Gracefulness" and Frösslind "The Timid Sweetness, Wit and Naivety". Her position was illustrated by her income: in 1834, she was given a salary of 1.600 in comparison to the average actress salary of 200, a salary equal to the prima donna of the Royal Opera Henriette Widerberg, and not much lower than the highest paid male colleague, which was 1.800.

=== Later career ===
Charlotta Eriksson participated in the great strike known as the First Torsslow Argument, and signed an article of protest along with several other of the most influential actors 4 July 1828 against initiated financial reforms which caused great attention in the press, but returned to her position when the demands of the strike was met and the reforms stopped. When the same reforms was introduced in 1834, she joined the second strike known as the Second Torsslow Argument, but this time the strike failed and several of the participants were fired. Charlotta Eriksson lost her position at the Royal Dramatic Theatre, officially because the theater management claimed they could no longer afford her. She was for a time active at the Djurgårdsteatern. She was however missed by the audience at the Royal Dramatic Theatre, the decision to fire her was considered to be hasty and there were demands that she should be engaged there again. The theater monopoly of the royal theaters inside the city borders of the capital made it difficult to secure employment, and in 1836, she asked to be taken back by the management of the Royal Dramatic Theatre, which immediately accepted, but lowered her salary from 1600 to 825. Her acceptance of a re engagement at the Royal Dramatic Theatre was reportedly med with "a common satisfaction".

Upon her return, Eriksson was initially forced to replace Sara Torsslow in the women main roles of tragedies, which exposed her to bad reviews for a while as the genre was not considered suited for her, until these roles were taken over by Emilie Högqvist, who became the new star within Torsslow's former repertoire. Eriksson could now return to her own repertoire, and the remainder of her career was successful.

During this period, she was gradually replaced by Emilie Högqvist in the heroine roles of the French salon comedies. When Högqvist was given the role of Victorine by Dumersan, Gabriel and Dupeuty (1836), a review in Teater och Musik wrote:

»Mrs E. and Mamsell Högqvist were both considered for the part of Victorine, which was finally given to Mamsell Högqvist, and we believe that this choice :was a better one in some aspects. Mrs E:s talents are, as commonly known, most splendid in the higher comedy, notwithstanding her success in dramas such as :Trettio år af en spelares lefnad. Mamsell Högqvist do not possess the polite tone, that feeling of comme il faut which belongs to Mrs E in so high :regard, but she does have more of a vivid, quixotic feeling, and in the more sentimental roles she are often capable to move the audience to tears."

However, she belonged to the theaters' elite actors until her retirement and her late successes was Catherine II in Charlotte Birch-Pfeiffers' Favorite (1841) and Duchess of Marlborough in Scribes A Glass of Water (1841). In 1838, the paper Freja praised her as "far superior to all the other actresses" of the Royal Dramatic Theatre.

Aside from her activity as an actress, Charlotta Eriksson was also active as a translator, and translated several plays from the French language to Swedish, which was then staged at the Royal Dramatic Theatre. She was also active as a deputy principal and an instructor of declamation at the Royal Dramatic Training Academy in 1837-1841.

Charlotta Eriksson retired from the Royal Dramatic Theatre after the 1841-42 season with a full pension.

=== Later life ===
Also after he retirement, Charlotta Eriksson was active onstage because of her interest of acting, though she no longer had financial reasons to work. She occasionally made sporadic guest performances in smaller theaters as well as at the Royal Dramatic Theatre, such as the travelling theaters of A. G. Wallins and W. T. Gilles, and at the Mindre teatern in the season of 1847-48, where she "continued to be what she has always been – an example for every younger actress." She made another season at the Mindre Teatern in 1849-50 and finally made her last performance at the Royal Dramatic Theatre in 1855, when she reportedly retained all the popularity of her audience.

Aside from her stage activity she traveled during her retirement, and witnessed the siege of Milan during the Revolutions of 1848 in the Italian states. She spent several years in Italy, and finally settled in Düsseldorf in Germany, where her son studied art. She studied art with him and died there in 1862.
