= Justina Casagli =

Swedish opera singer

Justina Kristina Casagli née Wässelius (4 October 1794 – 1841) was a Swedish opera singer. She was internationally famous and active in Italy and Germany. She was a member of the Royal Swedish Academy of Music.

== Life ==
Justina Casagli was born in Stockholm. She was the daughter of a tapestry manufacturer, and the sister of Jeanette Wässelius. The home was reportedly a poor one.

Following the example of her elder sister, she was enrolled in the Royal Dramatic Training Academy in 1805 under the tutelage of Sofia Lovisa Gråå. As such, she was active as a student in the performances of the student school. She was engaged at the Royal Swedish Opera in 1812-18. She married the Italien ballet dancer Luigi Casagli in 1812 and was thus known as Justina Casagli.

Justina Casagli was described as a graceful and lively beauty with a flexible voice and flawless dramatic ability. As her sister, the acknowledged prima donna at the time, she was one of the most valued members of the Royal Opera, which is visible in their contract: as her sister, she was given a salary of 1000 riksdaler, another 400 for concerts and the right to six months study trips. Justina Casagli was inducted to the Royal Swedish Academy of Music in 1817, the same year as her sister and Anna Sofia Sevelin, both of them elite singers of the Opera.

In 1818, Casagli left Sweden with her spouse and made her a successful Italian debut in La Cenerentola by Rossini in Turin. She continued to tour Italy successfully the following years, and became the first Swedish opera singer to have made an international career. In 1823, she made her debut in Rossini's La donna del lago in Rome, where her success was so great that she was said to have "made herself immortal". In Lucca in 1827, she made another performance in Cimarosa's Il matrimonio segreto, which attracted fame, before finding permanent employment. She was engaged at the National Theatre Munich in Munich in Germany in 1827-31.

In 1831, she was widowed and returned to Sweden, where she sought employment at the Royal Swedish Opera in Stockholm. She was refused a position because there were concerns that her voice had been damaged, and there was also less need for her after her former role there was filled by Henriette Widerberg.

Justina Casagli spent her last years in Parma, where she died. Her last years were marred by financial problems, and she committed suicide by throwing herself out a window during a depression caused by her financial difficulties.
