= Jeanette Wässelius =

Swedish opera singer

Marie Jeanette Wässelius (23 August 1784 – 5 December 1853) was a Swedish opera singer. She is referred to as the leading prima donna of the Royal Swedish Opera in the early 19th-century. She was a Hovsångare (1815) as well as an associé of the Royal Swedish Academy of Music (1817). She is also known as Mamsell Wässelia or only Wässelia.

== Life ==
Jeanette Wässelius was born in Stockholm. She was the daughter of a tapestry manufacturer, and the sister of Justina Casagli. The home was reportedly a poor one.

She was enrolled as a student of the Royal Dramatic Training Academy in 1793, where she became the student of Anne Marie Milan Desguillons. As such, she was active as a child actor in the student plays arranged by the school, as well as in minor children's roles of the Opera productions.

=== Career ===
Jeanette Wässelius was contracted as a singer at the Royal Swedish Opera on 1 April 1800.

In 1806, the Royal Swedish Opera was (temporarily) closed by order of king Gustav IV Adolf of Sweden, and remained closed for three years. During this period, many artists of the Opera lost employment or retired. Wässelia, however, was engaged as an actress at the adjoining Royal Dramatic Theatre. This was not a problem for her, as she was reportedly as capable as an actress as she was as a singer. In the season of 1809-10, the Royal Swedish Opera was opened again, and Wässelia was praised for "appealing modesty and naive love" for her performance in Le calife de Bagdad by Boieldieu opposite Gustav Åbergsson and Inga Åberg on the reopened Opera.

Jeanette Wässelius was often referred to as simply "Wässelia". She was highly respected for her professionalism, and according to director Gustav Löwenhielm, she never allowed neither her physical health nor her personal feelings ever to effect her work. Wässelia was said to unite an excellent lyric voice with an equally capable dramatic talent. Her voice was described as colorful and versatile, her posture graceful and her acting as "mute" but "admirably expressive". She was considered perfect for the parts of heroine and queen, except for the fact that she was seen as somewhat too short. She is however known to have been caricatured in the press and given the sobriquet "Miss Cucumber" because of her flat figure, a fact which was further highlighted by the fashionable Empire silhouette.

Jeanette Wässelius has been referred to as the successor of the prima donna Caroline Frederikke Müller and the leading lady of the Swedish opera stage in the early 19th-century. Initially noted in light operetta, she was given many of the women's main parts of the opera performances in the first two decades of the 19th-century and was considered to have few rivals there. Her position also signified her being assigned to perform at certain state occasions. One such occasion was when she performed a cantata with Christoffer Christian Karsten at a grand ball hosted at the Royal court in celebration of the Union of Sweden and Norway in 1814.

Wässelia was appointed official singer of the royal court or Hovsångare in 1815, and inducted as an associé to the Royal Swedish Academy of Music in 1817.

=== Later life ===
Jeanette Wässelius retired from the stage in 1820. She was succeeded as the prima donna by Henriette Widerberg who, despite having benefited by the retirement of Wässelia, claims that Jeanette Wässelius was unjustly dismissed. According to Henriette Widerberg, Wässelia was in 1820 at the age of 36 at the very high point of her ability, highly respected by most for her talent as well as her professional conduct, and that there had been no valid reason whatever to fire her other than the fact that she was involved in an intense conflict with her colleague Edvard du Puy, a man whom Widerberg referred to as "as mean as he was beautiful" and who was at that time also prefect of the opera stage, and who according to Widerberg successfully had Wässelia unjustly dismissed as the result of an intrigue and abuse of his power as prefect.

Wässelia is not noted to have been professionally active after her retirement. She was discharged with a full royal pension and lived in Stockholm, where she died. She never married.

=== Roles ===
Her most noted parts were the interpretations of Armide by Gluck, Laura in Léon, ou Le château de Monténéro by Dalayrac, Sophie in Sargino, ossia L'allievo dell'amore by Paër, Antigone in Oedipe uti Athen (Oidipus in Athens) by Sacchini, Constance in Les deux journées, ou Le porteur d'eau by Cherubini and Juliet in Roméo et Juliette composed by Daniel Steibelt (opposite Karl Gustaf Lindström), (1814–15 season) and Iphigénie in Iphigénie en Aulide by Gluck.

She made a success in the main part of Iphigénie en Aulide by Gluck in the benefit performance of Elisabeth Forsselius, who played Clitemnestre (1810); she played the protective angel of Sweden in Gustav Vasa by Gustav III and "did remarkably well" in Fästmännerna (The fiancees) opposite Inga Åberg.

Among her other parts were Lisette in Musikvurmen (Music craze) by Grenier during the 1796–97 season, Melisse in Renaud by Haeffner, (1800–01), Lina in L'opéra comique by F. P. Della Maria (1803–04), Amelina in Léhéman by Dalayrac (1804–05), Madame de Villeroux in Monsieur Des Chalumeaux by Pierre Gaveaux (1807–08), Elise in Une heure de mariage by Dalayrac (1808–09), Clorinde in Nicolas Isouard's Cendrillon opposite Elisabeth Frösslind (1810–11), Emilie in Les maris garçons by Berton (1812–23), Konstanze in Die Entführung aus dem Serail by Mozart, and Mathilda in Joconde by Isouard (1819–20).
