= Westerdahl =

Westerdahl is a surname. Notable people with the surname include:

- Eduardo Westerdahl (1902–1983), Spanish painter, art critic and writer
- Fanny Westerdahl (1817–1873), Swedish stage actress
- Kalle Westerdahl (born 1966), Swedish actor
- Stellan Westerdahl (1935–2018), Swedish sailor
