= Emilie Högquist =

Swedish actress

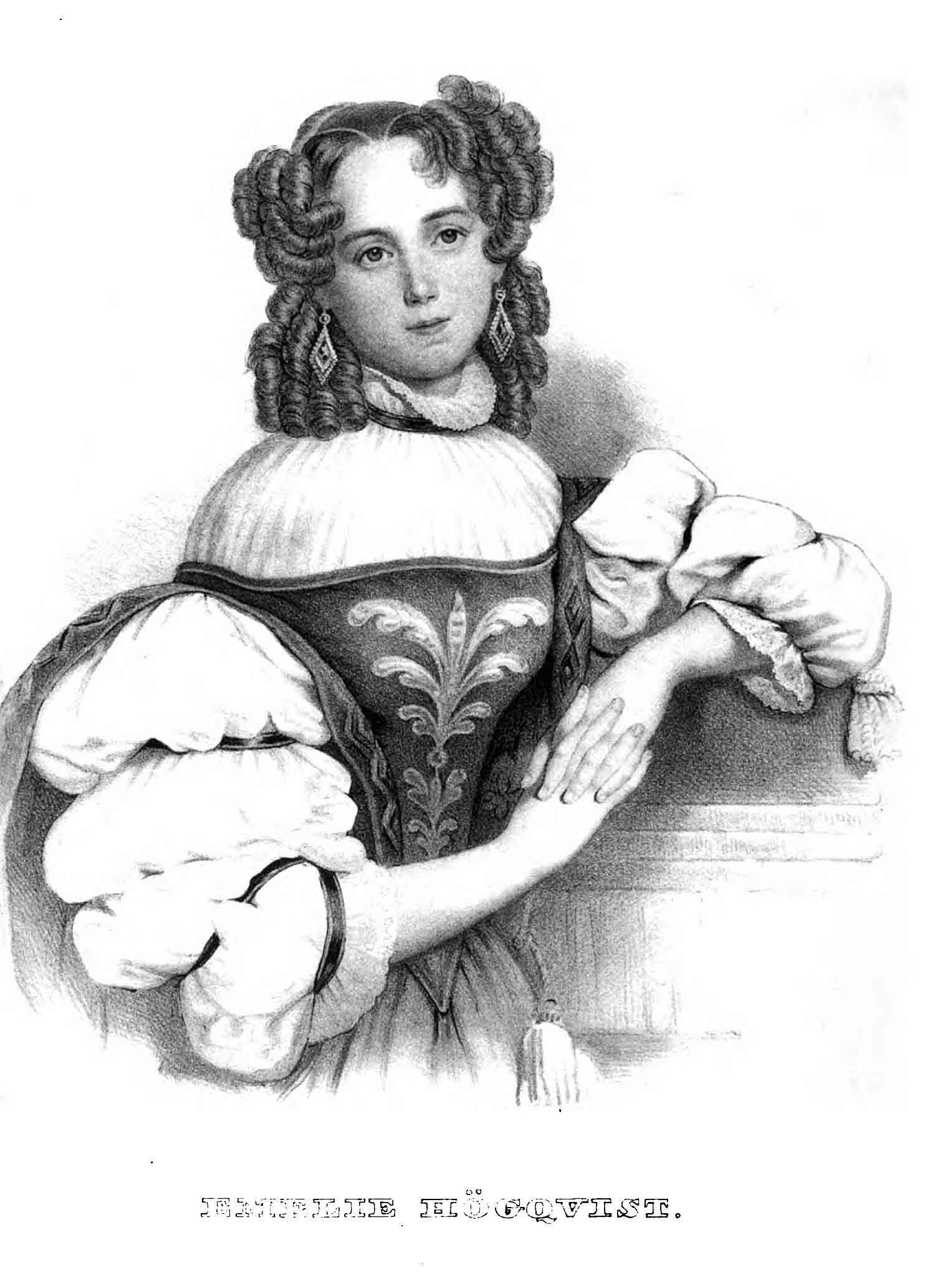
- Emilie Högquist
- Born: Emilie Sophie Högquist; 29 April 1812; Stockholm, Sweden
- Died: 18 December 1846 (aged 34); Turin, Italy

Emilie Sophie Högquist or Högqvist (29 April 1812 – 18 December 1846) was a Swedish stage actress. She was a star of the Royal Dramatic Theatre and has been referred to as the first celebrity within Swedish drama and known as the Swedish Aspasia, both for her artistic ability but also for the literary salon she hosted. She is also known in history for her love affair with King Oscar I of Sweden.

== Life ==
Emilie Högquist was the daughter of Anders Högquist, butler of count Carl De Geer, and Anna Beata Hedvall. She was the sister of actors Jean Högquist and Hanna Högquist.

=== Early life ===
In 1821, she was enrolled in the ballet school of the Royal Dramatic Training Academy by her mother. At the school, she was a student of Karolina Bock. During her tenure as a student, she participated in the Selinderska Barntheatern, a children's theatre managed by Anders Selinder.

Emilie Högquist was early in life subject of prostitution. The profession of her father exposed her to the interest of male members of the upper classes, and her mother was known to host balls, to which she invited students from the acting school, including her daughter, and introduced them to rich men. Furthermore, the Royal Dramatic Theatre also hosted balls in which men could pay for the privilege to dance with a student of the Royal Dramatic Training Academy. Both the balls given by her mother and the theater balls were regarded with some suspicion, because the situation in which rich men was introduced to poor female student artists was considered to give opportunity for prostitution. This is known to have occurred in certain cases, and in the case of Emilie Högquist, she was known to have been prostituted by her mother, who introduced her to a rich, elder male patron in 1826, after having ended her term at the acting school at the age of 14.

August Blanche once remarked of the mother of Emilie Högquist: "God save every child from a mother like that!"

Between 1826 and 1828, she toured Sweden as a member of the travelling theater company of Anders Petter Berggren. Upon her return to the capital in 1828, she was engaged at the Royal Dramatic Theatre in Stockholm.

=== Career ===
Emilie Högquist made her debut at the Royal Dramatic Theatre in the play Qväkaren in 1828, and was given a contract in 1831.

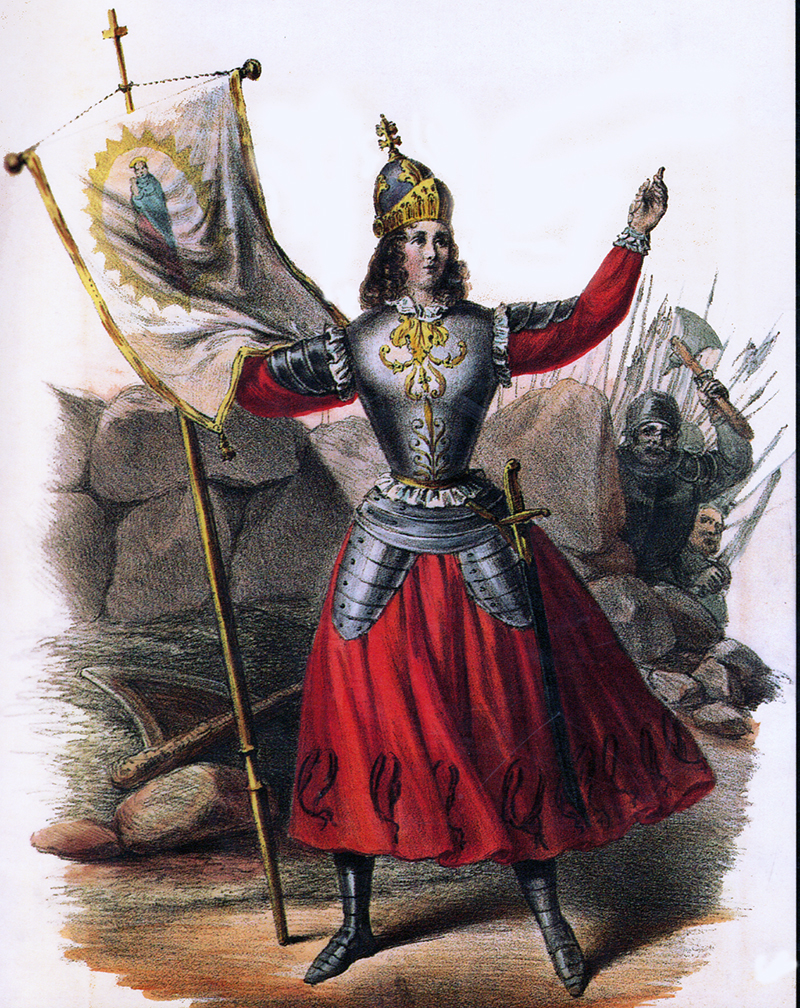
Emelie Högqvist as Joan of Arc

During the first years of her career, she was criticized for her weak and shrill voice and described as insecure in her movements onstage. In 1834, however, she made a trip to Paris, where she studied the contemporary French acting methods, after which she is said to have improved, learned how to act with more self assurance onstage, how to dress with more skill in accordance to her roles, and acquired a better control of her voice. Upon her return, an important opportunity to demonstrate herself was given when star actress Sara Torsslow, famed as the leading "sentimental actress" and comedienne of the Royal Dramatic Theatre, left after the actors' strike of 1834, after which a replacement had to be found to fill the roles otherwise normally allotted to Torsslow, and after the star actress Charlotta Eriksson had been unable to perform them satisfyingly, as they were not of her genre. Emilie Högvist was given the chance, and with such success that she reportedly won over not only Torrslow's old admirers, but also acquired a wide circle of admirers of her own, and she was from this year regarded as "one of the most celebrated and often performing actresses" of the Royal Dramatic Theatre.

She made a second study trip to Paris in the summer of 1837, during which she took lessons from Mademoiselle Mars, whom she admired as a role model, after which her inborn talent is said to have blossomed fully, and she was reportedly received with great enthusiasm by the audience upon her return to Stockholm for the 1837–38 season. Her salary can illustrate her rise in career; in 1835, Emilie Högquist had reached a wage of 1.200, while the minimum salary of an average actress was 200, and the prima donna of the Royal Swedish Opera, Henriette Widerberg was given a salary of 1.600.

Emilie Högquist was foremost celebrated in the roles within the then fashionable genre of French salon comedies, often plays by Eugène Scribe, and "excelled within graceful coquetry and lovable spirituality" - she is said to have succeeded best within comedy, where her "soft personality and unconventional acting celebrated triumphs. She was not only respected as an artist, but her beauty also attracted great attention, and Fritz von Dardel described her, "This actress, was perhaps even more famed for her beauty and her graces than for her talent. She was very tall and thin, with a skin of rose and lily, fine features and beautiful blond hair, and she was additionally good humored and pleasant." Among her most acclaimed roles were Qväkaren och dansaren (Quaker and the dancer) by Eugéne Scribe, Shakspears Kär (Shakespeare's Love), Jeanne d'Arc in Jungfrun av Orleans (Maid of Lorraine) by Schiller, the title role of Mary Stuart (play) and Ophelia in Hamlet. In the summer of 1839, she made a third study trip to Paris, and upon her return, she brought with her the comedy Richelieus första vapenbragd (First combat of Richelieu) by Bayard and Dumanoir, which she translated to Swedish and in which she was praised for her breeches role of the young duke de Richelieu (1842). She is noted to have performed 125 roles in the theater during her career in 1828–45, and she also made tours in Finland.

She made her last performance on 7 December 1845. In the theatre, she was replaced by Zelma Hedin. She was one of the three famous Swedish artistes who were officially celebrated in a memorial of famous Swedish actors in 1847.

=== Private life ===
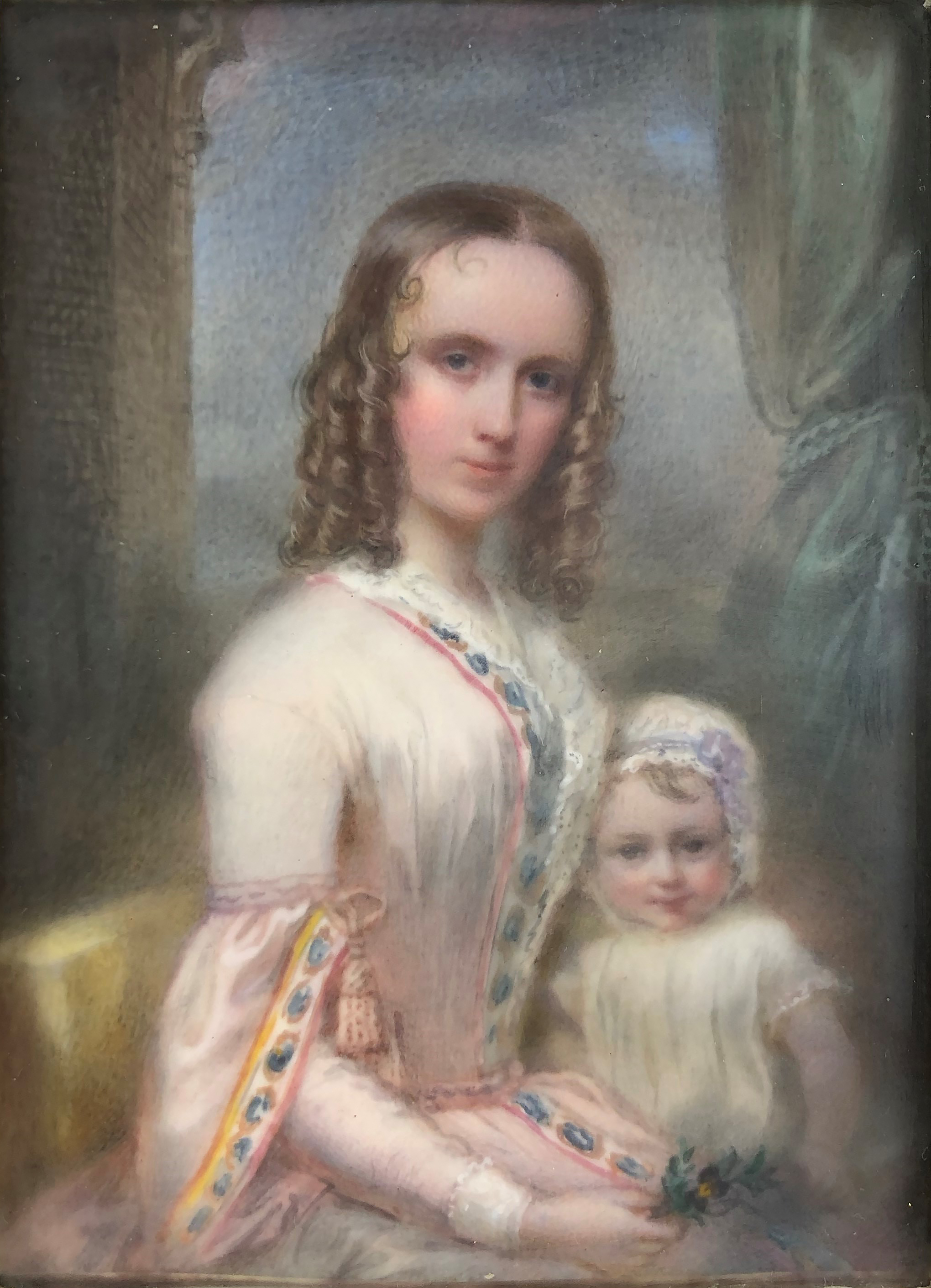
Högqvist with Max, one of her two sons by King Oscar I

In 1831–33, Emilie Högquist had an affair with the British diplomat John Bloomfield, 2nd Baron Bloomfield, who installed her in an apartment and with whom she had a daughter, Tekla, in October 1833.

Reportedly, the King, Charles XIV John of Sweden, financed Emilie Högquist's study trip to Paris in the summer of 1834, because his son Crown Prince Oscar had fallen in love with her and the King wished to have her removed. Upon her return to Stockholm, however, Oscar and Emilie had become lovers, and in the autumn on 1836, Oscar paid for Emilie Högquist to be installed in a "magnificent entrapment" at Gustaf Adolfs torg 18, and was known for its "Asian luxury". Reportedly, Crown Prince Oscar alternated in his nights between his "first family" in the Stockholm Palace, and his "second family" at Gustaf Adolfs torg close by. Emilie and Oscar had two sons, Hjalmar (born in 1839) and Max (born in 1840). Max was named for Maximilian de Beauharnais, Oscar's brother-in-law. The two boys were unofficially referred to as "the Princes of Lapland". Max grew up to become a merchant in China, where he died in 1872. Hjalmar died in 1874 in London.

Emilie Högquist was an intellectual and hosted a literary salon every Thursday for the Swedish art world of painters and authors. Notably, most of the guests at her salons were men, as women were afraid to be associated with her privately because of her reputation as a courtesan. Some exceptions were noted, such as Malla Höök and Elise Frösslind. She spent her summers at Framnäs on Djurgården. Though she died greatly in debt, the support of Crown Prince Oscar liberated her from any financial troubles and she was active within charity. She is noted to have acted as the patron of her brother Jean (Johan Isak) Högquist (1814–1850), who was a popular actor for a while, but did not manage his career because of his alcoholism. Emilie Högquist paid for his trip to the United States, but he returned on the year of her death, which is said to have affected him deeply, and he died just three years later. She is also noted to have supported former operatic singer Henriette Widerberg, who lived in deep poverty after her career had ended.

From 1842 onward, Emilie Högquist suffered from the health problems of a progressing consumption, and spent the summer in Rome, where she was celebrated by the Swedish art colony. Her health recovered, and upon her return, she visited her daughter and sons in Hamburg and met Emil Key, who was 10 years her junior, and became her last lover.

In the summer of 1845, she made a health journey to Carlsbad, but her illness had progressed to a point where she was no longer able to recover sufficiently to manage her work, and her last season of 1845-46 was a failure; after her last performance in December 1845, she was bedridden until May 1846. In July 1846, she left Sweden in an attempt to seek a cure for her consumption in a number of health resorts in Germany and Switzerland before continuing to Italy; she finally died in Turin 18 December 1846.

== In fiction ==
The relationship between Emilie Högquist and Oscar I was portrayed in the film Emilie Högquist starring Signe Hasso and Georg Rydeberg (1939), one of the most expensive made in Sweden during the 1930s.

== See also ==
- Elise Hwasser
- Charlotte Eckerman
