= Per Erik Sevelin =

Swedish actor

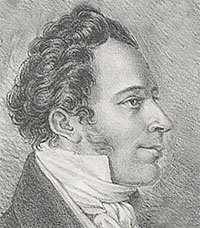
Per Erik Sevelin

Per Erik Sevelin (15 March 1791 - 26 August 1851), was a Swedish actor and ballet dancer.

== Biography ==
He was born in Stockholm, the son of the governor of an estate, Per Erik Sevelin, and Anna Katarina Nordström, and married the opera singer Anna Sofia Sevelin in 1813.

Per Erik Sevelin was trained as a ballet dancer in the Royal Swedish Ballet at the Royal Swedish Opera, where he was active as a dancer from 1801 to 1806. After this, he had a successful career as an actor. He was engaged at the Djurgårdsteatern in 1806-1811, the Royal Dramatic Theatre in 1811-1838, the Mindre teatern in 1838-1844, and again at the Royal Dramatic Theatre in 1844-1847.

Sevelin belonged to the star attractions of the Royal Theatre during the 1820s- and 30s. He was popular particularly for his ability to perform caricature within comedy. He resigned from the royal theatre in 1838 because he regarded his wife to have been badly treated by the theater management, who first destroyed her voice by exhaustion, then stopped giving her parts, and lowering her salary because she was not active: in 1837, she resigned because of this, and not long after, Per Erik Sevelin made a scandal at the stage in mid performance by resigning and declaring that he would never return. In 1844, however, his popularity with the audience made the royal theatre engage him again.
