= Ellen Hartman =

Swedish actress

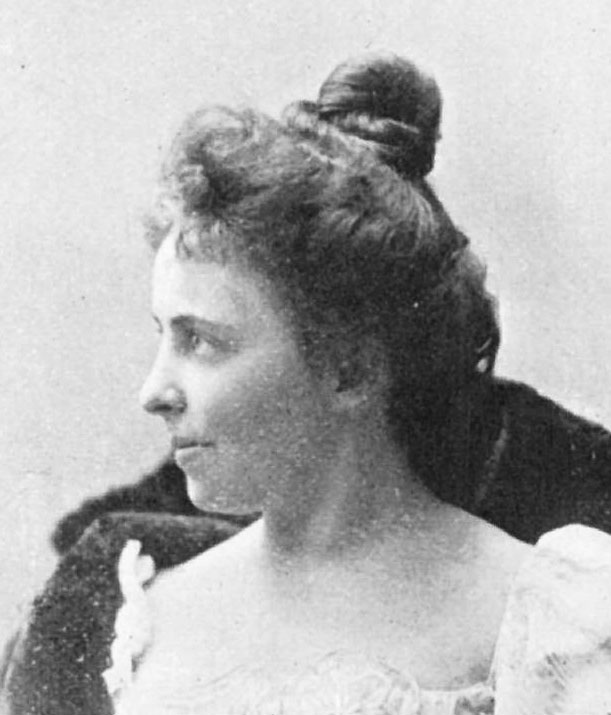
- Ellen Hartman, 1880-1890s
- Born: Helena Elisabeth Florentina Hedlund; 31 July 1860; Stockholm, Sweden
- Died: 4 January 1945 (aged 84); Stockholm, Sweden
- Other name: Ellen Hartman-Cederström
- Occupation: Actress
- Years active: 1877 – 1920s
- Spouse(s): Victor Laurentius Hartman (1881); Baron Carl Gustaf Bror Cederström (1898)

Ellen Hartman (born Helena Elisabeth Florentina Hedlund, 31 July 1860 in Stockholm – 4 January 1945 in Stockholm), was a Swedish actress. She was one of the greatest stars of the stage in Stockholm during the 1880s and 1890s. She was awarded the Litteris et Artibus.

== Biography ==
Ellen Hartman made her debut on the stage in 1877. She was a student of the Royal Dramatic Training Academy in Stockholm 1878–1880. Among her teachers were Bertha Tammelin. She was employed at the Royal Dramatic Theatre in 1880–1890, from 1886 as a premier actress.

She made a scandal when she eloped from her contract to Paris with her fiancé Gustaf Reinhold von Rosen. After this, she was active in Paris, and took part in the tour of Coquelin to Russia and Scandinavia. In 1893–94, she was employed at Théâtre Vaudeville in Paris.

She was active at the Royal Dramatic Theatre again in 1894–98.

In 1924, she participated in the film The Saga of Gosta Berling, starring Greta Garbo and Lars Hanson, in which Hartman portrayed Märta Dohna.

She is sometimes credited as Ellen Hartman-Cederström.

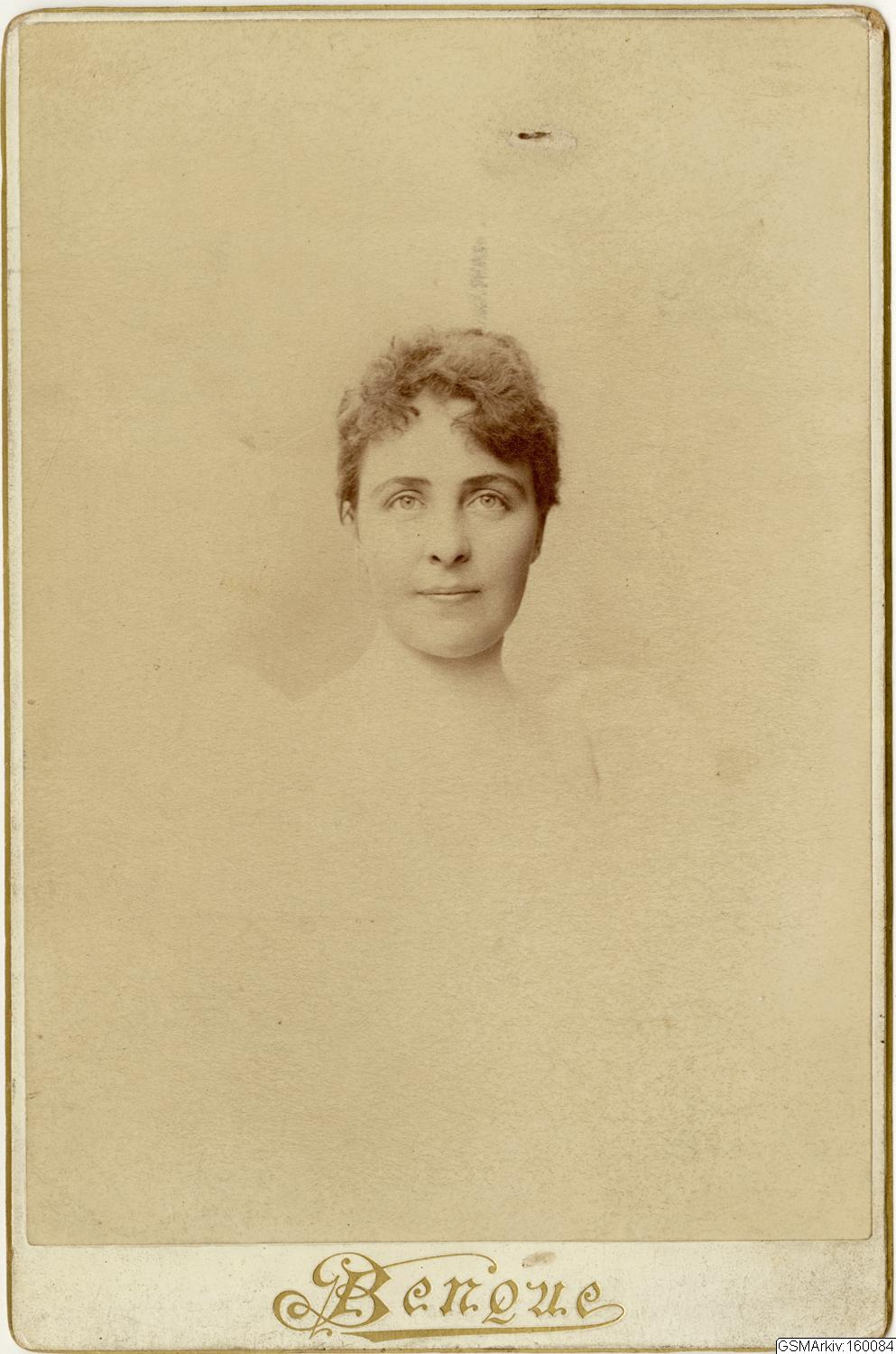
Ellen Hartman 1890

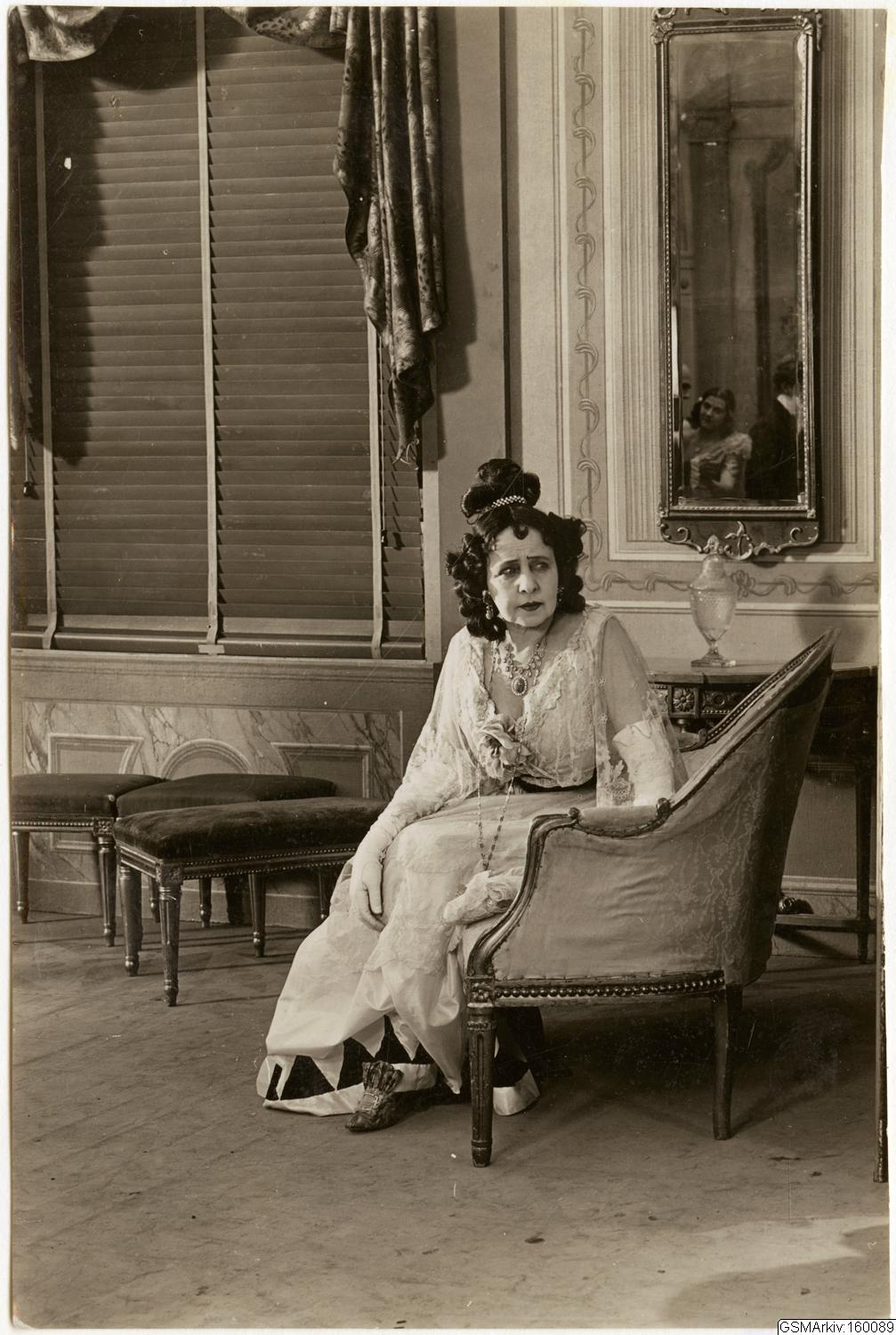
Ellen Hartman as Märtha Dohna 1924

== Personal life and death ==
She was married to the actor Victor Laurentius Hartman in 1881, and to Baron Carl Gustaf Bror Cederström in 1898. She died on January 5, 1945.

== Filmography ==
- The Saga of Gosta Berling (1924)
