= Carl Lindström =

Carl Lindström may refer to:

- Carl Lindström Company, a record company founded in 1893
- Carl Gustaf Lindström (1779–1855), Swedish opera singer
- Carl Herbert Lindström (1886–1951), Swedish fisherman, policeman, and tug of war competitor at the 1912 Summer Olympics
