= Hedvig Willman =

Swedish opera singer

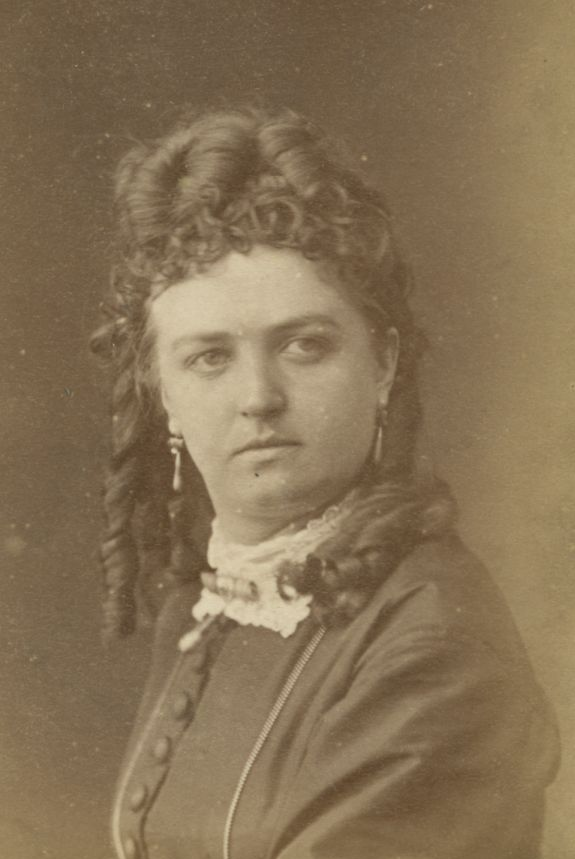
Hedvig Willman

Hedvig Charlotta Konstantina Willman née Harling (18 July 1841 – 15 August 1887) was a Swedish stage actress, opera singer and drama teacher. She was co-principal of the Royal Dramatic Training Academy in 1877-86.

== Life ==
Hedwig Willman was born in Stockholm. She was the daughter of the clothing merchant P. A. C. Harling and Emelie Charlotta Wàhlsten. She married the actor Anders Willman (1834-1898) in 1871.

=== Career ===
Hedvig Willman made her debut in Ladugårdslandsteatern in Stockholm in 1857, and was engaged at the theater company of Johan Anders Oskar Andersson (1813-1866) and then by Edvard Stjernström at the Mindre teatern. From 1863 onward, she was employed as an actor at the Royal Dramatic Theatre and, from 1865, as an opera singer at the Royal Swedish Opera in parallel.

About her career at the Mindre teatern it was said:

"She was there given the opportunity to demonstrate an intelligent judgement, which in union with a lively acting and an elegant appearance made her noted by the audience and resulted in her being among those of the Stjernström staff selected to remain in employment when the Mindre Teatern was sold to the Royal Theater in 1863.

In her capacity of a singer, she was often used within the Opéra comique. She performed as a guest artist in Denmark and Germany, notably at the Royal Danish Theatre in 1869. About her career as a singer it was said:

"... while not the owner of any remarkable resources she managed, by her acting talent and energetic work, solve several important tasks very well."

In 1877, she and her spouse were appointed joint principals of the Royal Dramatic Training Academy. She also gave singing lessons. One of her notable pupils was John Forsell (1868–1941) who was later the leading baritone of the Royal Swedish Opera.

Of Willman as an instructor it was said that:

"... there she exposed the energy and the sense, which illustrated her as a professional artist."

Hedvig Willman died in Stockholm in 1887 "after a long lasting illness". In retrospect it was said about her career:

"Mrs Willman was in possession of a great deal of stage talent, much will power and perseverance. As a purely dramatic artist she would with no doubt, if she had acted exclusively as such, reached an immensely more important position, than what she was able to reach now, when she gave her strongest efforts to the opera. "

== Other sources ==
- Nordensvan, Georg (1918) Svensk teater och svenska skådespelare från Gustav III till våra dagar. Andra delen, 1842-1918 (Stockholm: Bonnier) (Swedish)
