= Bertha Tammelin =

Swedish opera singer

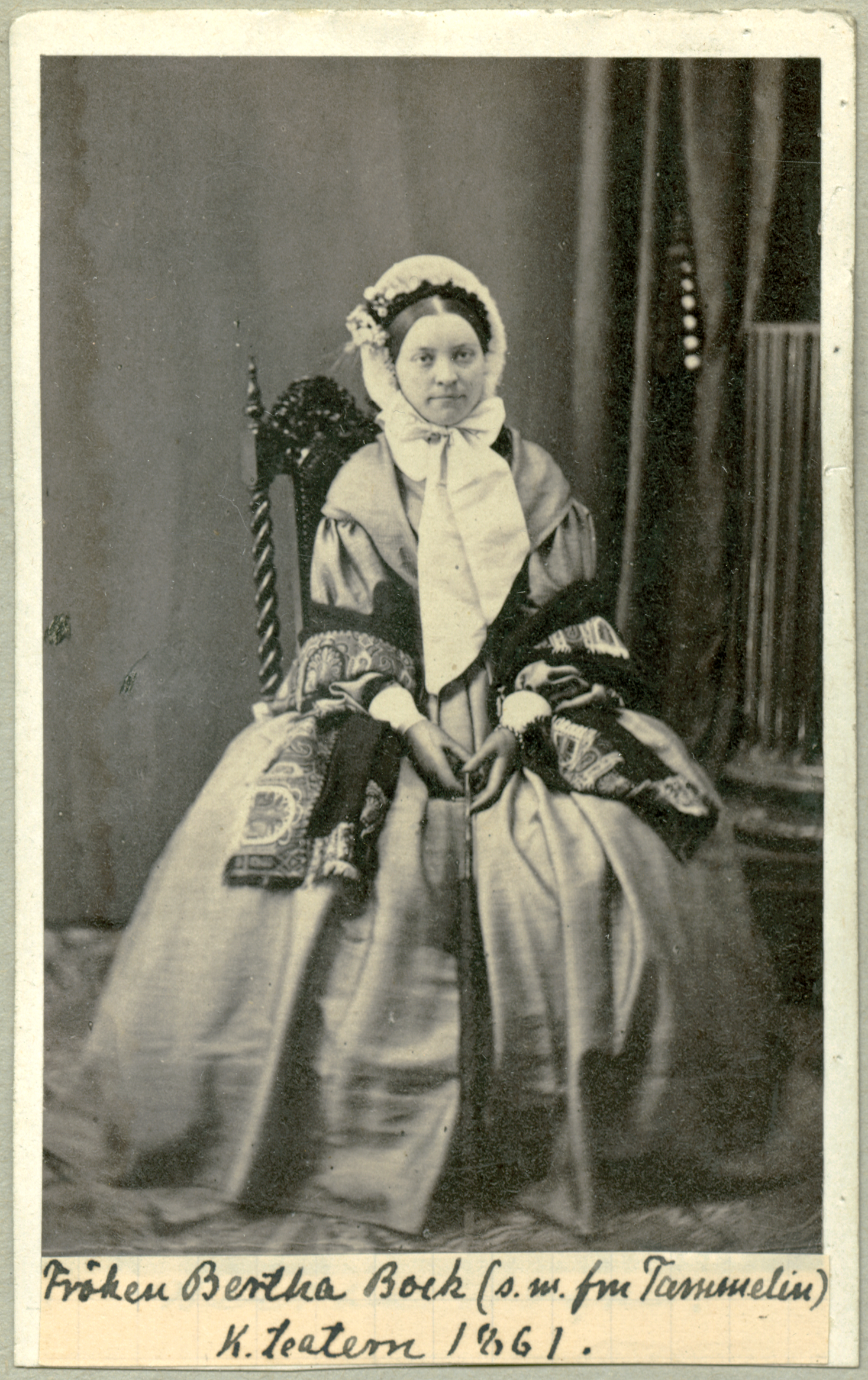

Background information
- Born: Bertha Carolina Mathilda Tammelin; 21 March 1836
- Origin: Sweden
- Died: 2 January 1915 (aged 78)
- Instrument: Piano

Bertha Carolina Mathilda Tammelin (née Bock; 21 March 1836 – 2 January 1915) was a Swedish actress, operatic mezzo-soprano, pianist, composer and drama teacher. Her mother was actress Karolina Bock. Tammelin taught at the Royal Dramatic Training Academy, where two of her notable students were Ellen Hartman and Ebba Lindkvist.

== Life ==
Bertha Tammelin was born in Stockholm, the daughter of actress Karolina Bock and a musician of Kungliga Hovkapellet, C. Bock. She was educated at the Royal Dramatic Training Academy 1853–1855 and hired at the Royal Swedish Opera and at the Royal Dramatic Theatre as a premier actress in 1856. She performed both operatic parts and dramatic parts. As an actress, her most noted part was Ingrid in Bröllopet på Ulvåsa by Frans Hedberg, and as a singer, Puck in Oberon.

Tammelin was also a musician. She studied piano with Jacopo Foroni, and held piano concerts at the age of fourteen. She was also active as a composer. Several of her works was a part of the collection Det sjungande Europa ('The Singing Europe'). From 1879, she was a music teacher at the Royal Swedish Academy of Music, and in 1889, she was made teacher of drama at the Royal Dramatic Training Academy. She also had private students. Among her famous students were Ellen Hartman and Ebba Lindkvist.

Tammelin experienced weak eyesight her entire life, and eventually, it worsened: she retired because of this condition, making her final appearance on stage on 7 March 1884.

She married accountant Filip Tammelin in 1873. She was given the Litteris et Artibus in 1885.
