= Anna Sofia Sevelin =

Swedish opera singer (1790–1871)

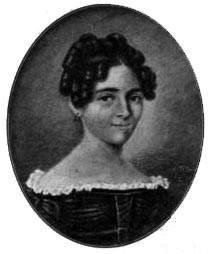
Anna Sofia Sevelin.

Anna Sofia Sevelin (née Thunberg; 23 July 1790 – 25 February 1871) was a Swedish opera singer (alto). She was a Hovsångerska and a member of the Royal Swedish Academy of Arts.

== Life ==
Anna Sofia Sevelin was the daughter of the church musician Olof Thunberg. She married the ballet dancer and actor Per Erik Sevelin in 1813.

She was enrolled as a student at the Royal Dramatic Training Academy in 1806. She made her debut in 1807, and was engaged as a singer at the Royal Swedish Opera in 1813–37. Sevelin also made tours abroad, and performed in Copenhagen and Hamburg.

Anna Sofia Sevelin was given good reviews as a singer. Her voice is described as a deep alto, which changed to a soprano with time. However, critics claimed that she lacked acting ability, and that she always performed on the stage as if she performed on a concert.

Reportedly, her voice was damaged by over exhaustion under the demands of the opera management. She discontinued her performances in 1833, and was formally discharged from the royal opera in 1837. Her husband, himself a popular actor, was reportedly outraged over the treatment she had been exposed to by the management and resigned himself in protest with the words that he would never return.

Anna Sofia Sevelin was inducted to the Royal Swedish Academy of Music in 1817, and made hovsångare in 1837.

In the 1850s, the journalist and critic Nils Arfwidsson described Anna Sofia Sevelin in retrospect:

"Mrs Sevelin born Thunberg, the virtuous and respected wife of comedian Sevelin, was the prima donna of the operatic stage during the entire 20s. [...] Her voice was a high and strong soprano, much trained — she was our only coloroatura soprano for a long time — but was early on destroyed by the arias of the fairy queen in The Magic Flute and lost much freshness and sound, abilities which she reportedly owned in high degree during her first years. Nevertheless she sang Armide, Agatha in The Poacher, Donna Elvira in Don Juan, etc and always enjoyed a succés d’estime [...] She can be said to have introduced the modern Italian music to us; for long before the operas of Rossini where performed here - and in them she was then the only one here who could perform the lead roles - she performed on concerts the great female arias of these compositions and always with much praise for the skill she displayed while doing so. Later, when Tancred as before Mozart's Titus was performed here, she played the male soprano parts in these operas. "
