= Sofia Lovisa Gråå =

Sofia Lovisa Gråå (née Palm; 1749 – 8 May 1835) was a Swedish educator of actors, noted for innovations that in modern times would be described as feminist.

== Biography ==
Sofia Lovisa Palm was from 1788 married to Fredrik Gabriel Gråå, the interpreter for the Russian embassy in Stockholm, who died in 1795. She was the principal of the Royal Dramatic Training Academy, the acting school of Sweden's Royal Dramatic Theatre, in Stockholm, from 1804 to 1812. She also, during her period as principal, oversaw student housing, with the female students in fact living in her home.

Gråå advocated for continuation of the French acting traditions introduced in the 1793–1798 tenure of the French-born and -trained Anne Marie Milan Desguillons and her husband Joseph. She was the first woman to hold this position alone. It was a difficult position at this point, during the temporary dissolution of the Royal Swedish Opera in 1806–09, which caused confusion in the Theatre's organisation.

She gave the girls in her house great personal freedom; choir master Wikström was shocked that she allowed the girls to date teenage boys. Gråå herself paid no mind to the criticism and did not find her treatment of the students irresponsible; when she retired, she stated in her apply for a pension that she had accepted the position without any promise of economic compensation in her contract, and that she had always conducted a respectable and caring way to perform her task both as a principal and as a hostess for the female student's dorm. She retired in 1812 and was succeeded by Caroline Halle-Müller.

She educated many of the best known actors of the first half of the 19th century in Sweden, including Justina Casagli, Charlotta Eriksson, Sara Torsslow and Karolina Bock; the female students graduating during this time were often referred to as "The Gråå Girls".
