= Ebba Lindkvist =

Swedish actress and film director

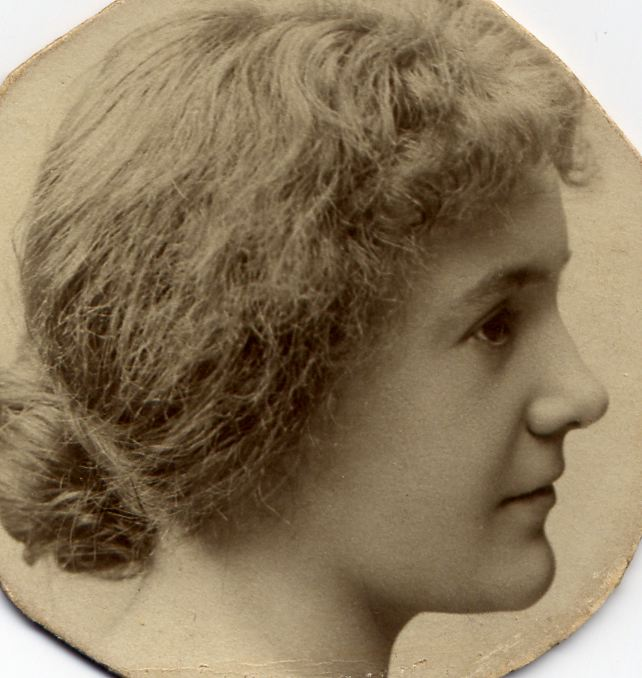
- Born: 10 March 1882

Ebba Johanna Bergman Lindkvist, also Lindqvist, (1882–1942) was a Swedish actress and film director.

In 1910 she directed the short drama, Värmländingarna, which premièred in Sweden on 27 October 1910. As a result, she is considered the first woman to have become a film director in Sweden, creating her first film the year before Anna Hofman-Uddgren's Stockholmsfrestelser was premièred on 27 April 1911. She would chronologically be the second female feature film director in the world after Alice Guy-Blaché having debuted as a film maker in 1910, one year before both Anna Hofman-Uddgren and Luise Fleck.

== Biography ==
Born on 10 March 1882 in Stockholm, Ebba Johanna Bergman was the daughter of Emma Augusta Charlotta, née Brobeck, and Gustaf Edvard Bergman. The second of four children, she studied song and drama with the opera singer Bertha Tammelin (1836–1915) and the actor Emil Hillberg (1852–1929). She went on to work as an actress in both travelling and municipal theatres. In May 1907, she married Victor Lindkvist with whom she opened a singing and drama school in Malmö in 1910.

Surviving footage from Värmlänningarna (1910)

In October 1910, Lindkvist's version of Fredrik August Dahlgren's play Värmlänningarna was released, an earlier version by Carl Engdahl having been premièred in January the same year. She therefore preceded Anna Hofman-Uddgren as Sweden's first female director, even if her film was technically less professional than Hofman-Uddgren's. Lindkvist herself performed in the film.

Suffering from pneumonia, Ebba Lindkvist died on 5 June 1942 at a clinic in Växjö in the south of Sweden.

It was not until 2016 that she was recognized as Sweden's first film director. The Ebba Award, presented to a female director, photographer, screenwriter, or editor from Skåne is named after her.
