= Mademoiselle Mars =

French actress (1779–1847)

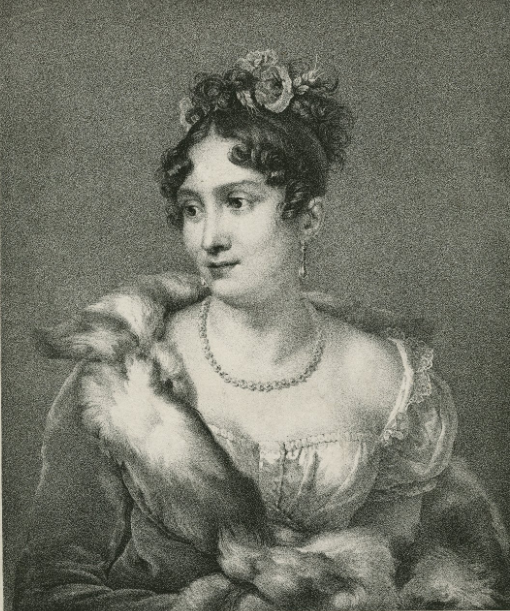
- Born: Anne Françoise Hyppolyte Boutet Salvetat; 9 February 1779; Paris
- Died: 20 March 1847 (aged 68)
- Children: 2

Mademoiselle Mars (pseudonym of Anne Françoise Hyppolyte Boutet Salvetat; 9 February 1779 – 20 March 1847), French actress, was born in Paris, the natural daughter of the actor-author named Monvel (Jacques Marie Boutet) (1745–1812) and Jeanne-Marie Salvetat (1748–1838), an actress known as Madame Mars, whose southern accent had made her Paris debut a failure.

== Life ==
Mlle Mars began her stage career in children's parts, and by 1799, after the rehabilitation of the Comédie-Française, she and her elder half-sister (Marie-Louise-Geneviève Salvetat, called Louise and known professionally as Mlle Mars aînée) joined that company, of which she remained an active member for 33 years. Her beauty and talents soon placed her at the top of her profession.

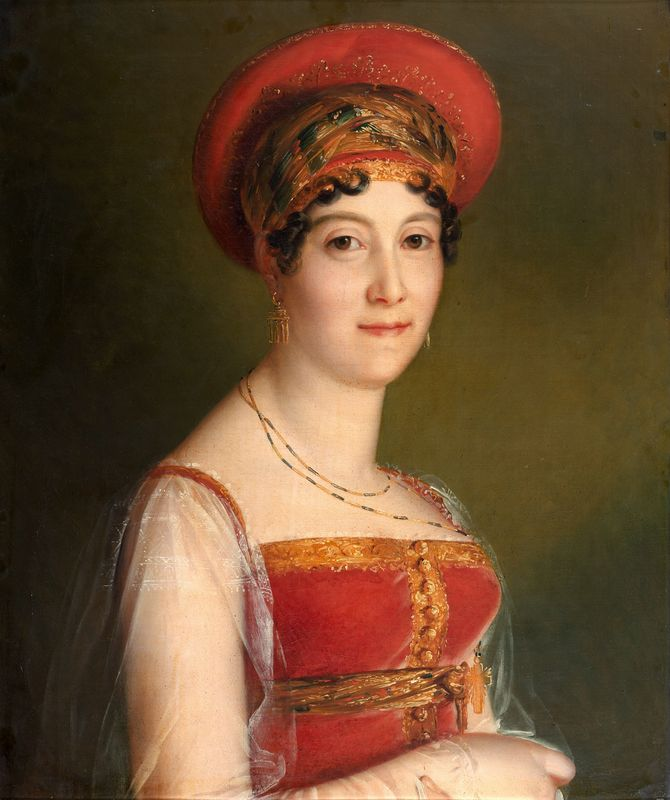
Mademoiselle Mars, by François Gérard, 1814

Molière, Marivaux, Michel-Jean Sedaine, and Pierre Beaumarchais had her as an interpreter of their work, and in her career of half a century, besides many comedy roles of the older repertoire, she created fully a hundred parts in plays which owed success largely to her. She also helped educate foreign actors, among them the Swedish actors Charlotta Eriksson and Emilie Högquist. For her farewell performance she selected Elmire in Tartuffe, and Silvia in Jeu de l'amour et du hasard, two of her most popular roles; and a few days after, Climène in Le Misanthrope and Araminthe in Les Femmes savantes.

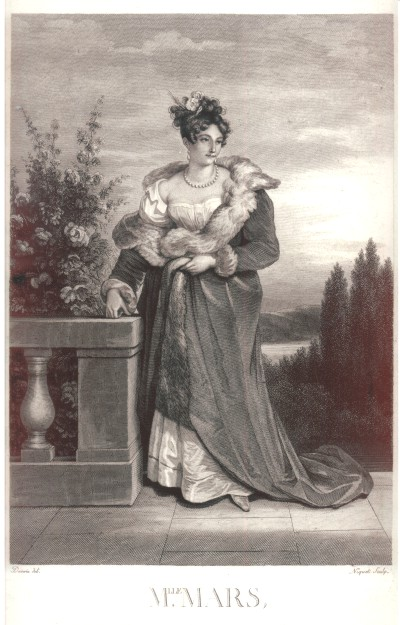
On set

By her liaison with a Swiss-born French soldier, Nicolas Bronner (1773–1816), she had three children: a son, who died at birth; Louis-Alphonse (born 14 March 1799), and a daughter, Hippolyte (1800-31 March 1820).

Mademoiselle Mars retired in 1841 and died in Paris on 20 March 1847. She and her children are buried in Pere Lachaise cemetery; sharing the tomb is the body of her niece, an actress known as Georgina Mars (died 1828).
