= Henriette Widerberg =

Swedish opera soprano

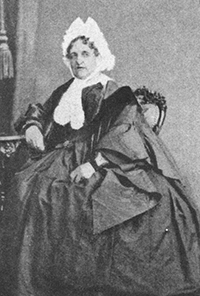
- Born: 3 December 1796; Stockholm
- Died: 3 April 1872 (age 75); Stockholm
- Occupations: Opera singer, actress, memoirist
- Children: Georgina Wilson, Julia Liedberg, Clary, Axel, and a son given up for adoption.

Henriette Sophie Widerberg (3 September 1796 – 3 April 1872) was a Swedish opera singer (soprano) and memoirist. She was an elite member of the Royal Swedish Opera and its prima donna for over twenty years. She was appointed Hovsångare in 1837.

She was the first woman in Sweden to publish her own memoirs during her own lifetime. Her book En Skådespelerskas Minnen: Sjelfbiografi (Memories of an Actress: an Autobiography) was published in two parts in 1850–51, and republished in 1924.

== Life ==
=== Early life ===
Henriette Widerberg was the daughter of the actor Andreas Widerberg and the actress Anna Catharina Widebäck. Her father was originally the star actor and later director of Comediehuset in Gothenburg, where her parents met and married the same night in 1787 of which they played onstage lovers. The family moved to Stockholm when her father was employed at the Royal Dramatic Theatre, where he became an elite actor and admired for his beauty and "male figure".

Henriette Widerberg was all active on stage early on. Described as a beautiful child, her mother arranged for her stage career when she was very young, in order for her to contribute to the household, which was in a poor financial state after the death of her father. Widerberg described in her memoirs how she played with dolls when her mother received gifts from her (Henriette's) adult male admirers.

She was enrolled in the Royal Dramatic Training Academy in 1807, where she was tutored by Sofia Lovisa Gråå in the French tradition of Anne Marie Milan Desguillons. Between 1810 and 1817, she was active first in the theater of Isaac de Broen in Djurgårdsteatern, and then in the travelling theater of Johan Anton Lindqvist, which performed in Comediehuset in Gothenburg. During her tenure in Gothenburg, she was given very good reviews and popularity as a singer.

=== Career at the Royal Opera ===
On 24 August 1817, Henriette Widerberg made her debut at the Royal Swedish Opera as Laura in the opéra-comique Léon ou Le Château de Monténéro by Nicolas Dalayrac, a debut which was reviewed as "touching to a degree which made the audience melt to tears."

After the retirement of Jeanette Wässelius three years later, she took over her roles and became the prima donna of the Swedish Opera stage for about twenty years onward. Her position as was reflected by her salary. She was given a salary of 1600 riksdaler, an amount surpassing any other woman in the Royal Theatres (Royal Swedish Opera and Royal Dramatic Theatre): as comparison, the minimum salary of a female singer or actress was 200, and the highest paid male elite colleague was given 1800, an amount only slightly higher than hers.

Henriette Widerberg's soprano voice was not, as it was said, unusual because of its strength, but was described as having a soft timbre with an uncommon and personal sound, and her voice was once said to be superior to that of Jenny Lind. She was also a capable actress and could perform the speaking parts of her role well. She has been described as a natural talent, but also as an indolent character who neglected to educate herself because she did not have to: "She was not an educated singer; she was hardly able to read notes, and she rehearsed her parts without much discipline - but she was able to do this, because she could grasp things incredibly quickly." Reportedly, she did not bother to read notes, but instead asked the orchestra to sing and play her part for her, and after having heard her part once, regardless of instrument used, she was able to memorize it and perform. The quality of her performance is said to have been depended upon her own sympathy for her role: consequently, the reviews describe her as bad in parts she did not like, mediocre in parts she was indifferent to, and fabulous in parts, she liked:

"If she pleased to adjust herself to the situation - and she could, when she wanted to - then this voice was irresistibly enchanting, intoxicating. The poetry of voice was something no one knew more than her."

Orvar Odd referred to her as the Malibran of Sweden and added: "A Malibran without learning but what voice, oh, thou nightingales!"

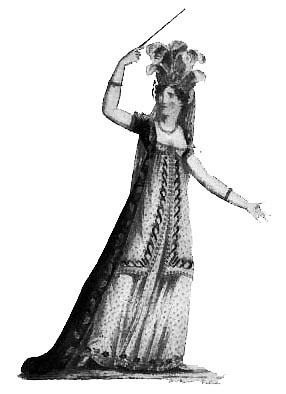
Henriette Widerberg in Armide (1823).

Widerberg started with parts in light operettas, until her performance as Julia in La vestale by Spontini (1821) proved her capable of performing more demanding parts. Among her roles were Pamina in The Magic Flute, Anna in Don Juan and Susanna in The Marriage of Figaro, all by Mozart; the title role in La dame blanche by Boieldieu, the title role in Armida by Rossini, and Amazily in Fernand Cortez by Spontini, Clara in Adolphe et Clara, ou Les deux prisonniers by Dalayrac, Cora in Cora och Alonzo by Johann Gottlieb Naumann. In 1832, she played the part of Leonora in the Swedish premier of Beethovens opera Fidelio. Her most acclaimed part was reportedly as Princess Amazali in Ferdinand Cortez by Spontini in 1826. In her performance as Zerlina in Fra Diavolo by Auber (17 May 1833) she became the first woman at the Royal Swedish Opera to do an undressing scene, which was highly controversial and commented by the press: "Now, a woman can do on stage what she could not do even in the most intimate circle of a decent company, and undress herself until her petticoat."

There are numerous anecdotes from Henriette Widerberg's career in Swedish opera history, many of them described in her memoirs. One is associated with her performance as Susanna in Figaro (1821). Her colleague Edvard du Puy, who was to play Figaro, invited her to his room to rehearse the play, but when he was there, he tried to seduce her. Widerberg, who was known to dislike du Puy, who she accused of having unjustly brought about the dismissal of Jeanette Wässelius, declined and left. When she did not know her part the next day, du Puy reported her to the director for not knowing her part and thereby delaying the production, and the director used the opera's disciplinarian system to place her in arrest in her dressing room. Insulted, Widerberg threatened to jump out of the window when the caretaker came to put extra locks on her door, but was comforted by her colleagues, who arranged a little party in her room. The next day, she formally protested against the arrest and acquired if it was lawful, which in fact it was - the old disciplinarian rules were not abolished until the strike of 1828. When the performance of Figaro finally took place, and the opera reached the scene in which Susanna (Widerberg) was to slap Figaro (du Puy) in the face seven times, she did so with such enthusiasm that the audience started to laugh.

She was known to be frank and witty in her language. When one of the directors, which was known to be less careful about his personal appearance and hygiene, questioned her about her high bills associated with her appearance, she said: "It is easy to say, Mr Count, for someone with no idea how much it costs to keep oneself clean and fresh!" In her memoirs, she recalled how she complained about men and boys trying to take a look at her when she had to change during performances, this director guarded her from them, but at the same time observed her himself instead - though she ads, that he was actually harmless. Henriette Widerberg remained neutral during the great strikes "First Torsslow Argument" (1828) and "Second Torsslow Argument" (1834).

She was appointed official singer of the royal court or Hovsångare in 1837.

=== Private life ===
As a person, Henriette Widerberg is described as: "Witty, kind, happy and always ready to make a joke, even on her own expense. She was not arrogant, not greedy for money, she did not plot or spread rumors."

Henriette Widerberg was known for her many love affairs and was said to "have the tendency to change the object of her tender affection." She had the reputation of being a courtesan, but whether this was correct is a question of definition, as this was a term easily applied to women who had affairs at the time even if they did not charge money for sexual services. She had a number of affairs with several prominent men which attracted attention. Among her lovers were the British diplomat Charles Manners St George, count Axel Mauritz Piper, the royal chamberlain count Magnus Brahe, the Austrian diplomat Eduard von Woyna, baron Claes Hans Rålamb and the nobleman Carl Manderström. In her memoirs, she described how admirers invited her to their mansions in the country, dressed themselves as women in order to be allowed to get in to her dressing room and how many of the affairs ended in scenes and drama from jealous or rejected lovers. There were plans of a marriage between Henriette Widerberg and count Axel Mauritz Piper, but the plans fell through when Piper ultimately decided to marry someone from the nobility instead, which reportedly affected Widerberg deeply.

Henriette Widerberg never married but had five children, three daughters and two sons, notably the actress Georgina Wilson, daughter of the secretary of the British Embassy, Charles Manners St George, who was considered a capable actress, and Julia Liedberg (1824–1847), who was engaged at the Royal Swedish Opera: both of them reportedly "left after themselves a beautiful and non clouded memory." Her daughter Clary and her son Axel lived private lives, but her other son was adopted. He is commonly said to be identical with the Vackra Roosen ('Beautiful Rose') (1839–1912), a popular eccentric singer and guitarist known for his beauty, who preferred to live the life of a Boheme street musician despite being offered an education as an opera singer, because he did not like to subject to the restraints of a regular life. Henriette Widerberg described in her memoirs an incident in which her small children once saw her act in the death scene of Romeo and Juliet and started to cry "Mother is dead, mother is dead!" because they thought it was real.

Reportedly, Henriette Widerberg had a poor sense of financial affairs and mismanaged her economy, a fact which was to prove disastrous when her career at the Royal Opera was discontinued and she no longer had the protection of her status there.

=== Later life ===
Henriette Widerberg was dismissed from her position at the Royal Swedish Opera after the 1836–37 season. The reason was her increasing behavior of refusing to play parts she did not like or cancel performances she did not like to participate in, traits that had been accepted in the beginning of her career, but had by 1835 increased to such an extent that the opera management came in to open conflict with Widerberg. Her dismissal was not liked by her admirers in the audience, who demanded her return, but the differences between Widerberg and the management could not be solved and neither part could agree to a new contract. Her popularity, however, ensured her activity as a guest artist for the first years. She was active as a guest performer at the Royal Opera in the 1838–39 season and the 1839–40 season, but failed to be given a new contract and made her final performance at the Royal Opera as a guest artist in June 1840, after which she unsuccessfully tried to secure employment in Germany.

Between 1842 and 1844, she was engaged at the Mindre teatern where she, according to Aftonbladet, performed with the same talent previously admired at the Royal Opera. The life of Henriette Widerberg after her retirement from the Royal Opera was however marred by a spiral of deteriorating financial troubles. Her financial situation and her difficulty in managing her economy had been hard also during her tenure at the Royal Opera, but she had been protected by her status and position there, and after her retirement, she was pressed by her creditors and unable to find a solution to pay her debts. During her employment at the Mindre teatern, she was heavily indebted to a moneylender, and in turn placed her employer, the theater manager Anders Lindeberg who had agreed to become her security, in heavy debt. After her dismissal from the Mindre teatern in 1844, the playwright August Blanche described how the "poor discarded singer" lived with her brother, the alcoholic former leader of a travelling theater Fredrik Julius Widerberg, making a living selling soap and how both of them was only saved from "utter misery" by the charity of Emilie Högquist. Widerberg described her plans of opening an inn, and it seem as though she did in 1848, though nothing more is known of this activity.

In 1850–51, she published her memoirs, the first memoirs published by a Swedish woman during her own lifetime and published, as she stated, in the hope that it would be possible for her to support her children by any income from it. In 1859, her small pension from the royal opera was enlarged, but she reportedly died in poverty.
