= Karolina Bock =

Swedish actress

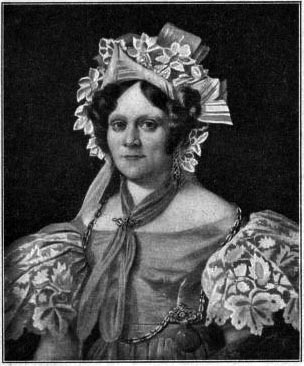
- Born: Karolina Sofia Richter; August 28, 1792; Stockholm, Sweden
- Died: 22 March 1872 (aged 79); Sweden
- Other names: Karolina Richter, Karolina Svanberg
- Spouse(s): Johan Gabriel Svanberg, Carl Friedrich Bock

Karolina Sofia Bock née Richter (August 28, 1792, Stockholm – 22 March 1872) was a Swedish stage actress. She was the principal and drama teacher of the Royal Dramatic Training Academy twice: from 1831 to 1834, and from 1841 to 1856. She was an elite actress of the Royal Dramatic Theatre.

== Life ==
Karolina Richter was born to the hautboist Carl Johan Richter and Magdalena Sofia Rytting.

She was a student of the Royal Dramatic Training Academy at the Royal Swedish Opera between 1806 and 1810. She was a student of Sofia Lovisa Gråå, and belonged to those female stage artists of her generation referred to as the "Grå Girls".

=== Early life ===
Karolina Bock was engaged at the Djurgårdsteatern and the Nya komiska teatern of Isak de Broen in 1813-14. In 1814, she was engaged at the Royal Dramatic Theatre, where she remained active until her retirement on 26 June 1863.

Karolina Bock came to belong to the elite of Swedish actors generation. She was not regarded suitable for heroine parts, which were often the main female roles of the plays of the epoch, but established herself well already in her youth with the roles of old women in comedies, a category in which she formed a successful career and never lacked assignments, becoming:

"...an often used and well seen actress, who never spoiled a part but were terrific in most and always gave her figures a sharply lined characteristic. :Particularly in her interpretation of old women's parts she developed in to a talent of the first order."

It was said of her that she had a rare quality: she knew her own limitations.

Among her most successful roles were the title role in Min tante Aurore by Boieldieu, Veneranda in Slottet Montemero, Mrs Slammerström in Bildhuggaren, Aunt Vivika in General Eldhjelm, Mrs Griponiai in Brodertvisten by Kotzebue, Mrs Miller in Kabal och kärlek, Viarda in Preciosa, Mrs von Fromuth i Porträttet, Mrs Wunschell in Grefvarne Klingsberg, Theodolinda in Doktor Wespe, Mrs Darmantiéres in Dottersonen, Margarita in Mazarin, Fadette in Syrsan (the dramatisation of La Petite Fadette by George Sand), Mrs Malapropp in Rivalerna, Mrs Harleigh in Jane Eyre and Gunilla Fipps in Mäster Smith. On 26 June 1863, Bock retired after having made her final performance in her favorite part, the grandmother in Porträttet.

Karolina Bock was given the Litteris et Artibus by the king in 1857, in recognition of her dramatic career.

=== Educator ===
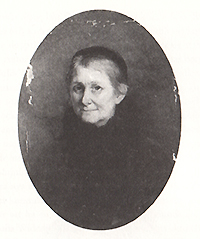
Carolina Bock DTM

Karolina Bock was the principal and drama teacher of the Royal Dramatic Training Academy twice: from 1831 to 1834 and from 1841 to 1856. She also served as instructor of declamation there.

Several generations of Swedish actors were shaped by Bock. Among her students were Emilie Högquist and Jenny Lind. Her method was that of the French technique which had been introduced at the school by Anne Marie Milan Desguillons and kept at the time of her own tenure as student there under Sofia Lovisa Gråå. She was known for her skill at giving instruction in the correct distinction of the language in both song and speech, and it was said that all of her students were recognizable by having the distinction taught during her tenure.

Her technique, however, belonged to the elder French school of solemnity which was replaced by the new romantic schools more natural acting by the mid-19th century. Furthermore, though Karolina Bock was described as an excellent teacher, she was also described as one who forced a more strict discipline upon her students, and in 1856, she was deposed as principal after protests by the acting class.

The "Bock Woman" was described as a "theatre original" with a fierce temperament. When she was given the task to instruct the Danish guest artist Charlotte Bournonville (daughter of August Bournonville) in the Swedish language in 1857, she performed the task so well that Bournonville could perform soon after as a native Swede in the part of Fatima in Oberon, where she made success. When the direction thanked Bock for this, she "gave them such a load of barking that they quickly retreated."

=== Personal life ===
Karolina Bock was married twice. In 1813, she married Johan Gabriel Svanberg violinist at the royal chapel, from whom she divorced in 1822, assuming the name Mrs Richter. In 1826, she married Carl Friedrich Bock, who played the flute in the royal chapel. She was the mother of Bertha Tammelin, who became an actor, singer, composer, musician and a teacher at the Royal Dramatic Training Academy.
