= Malla Höök =

Swedish actress

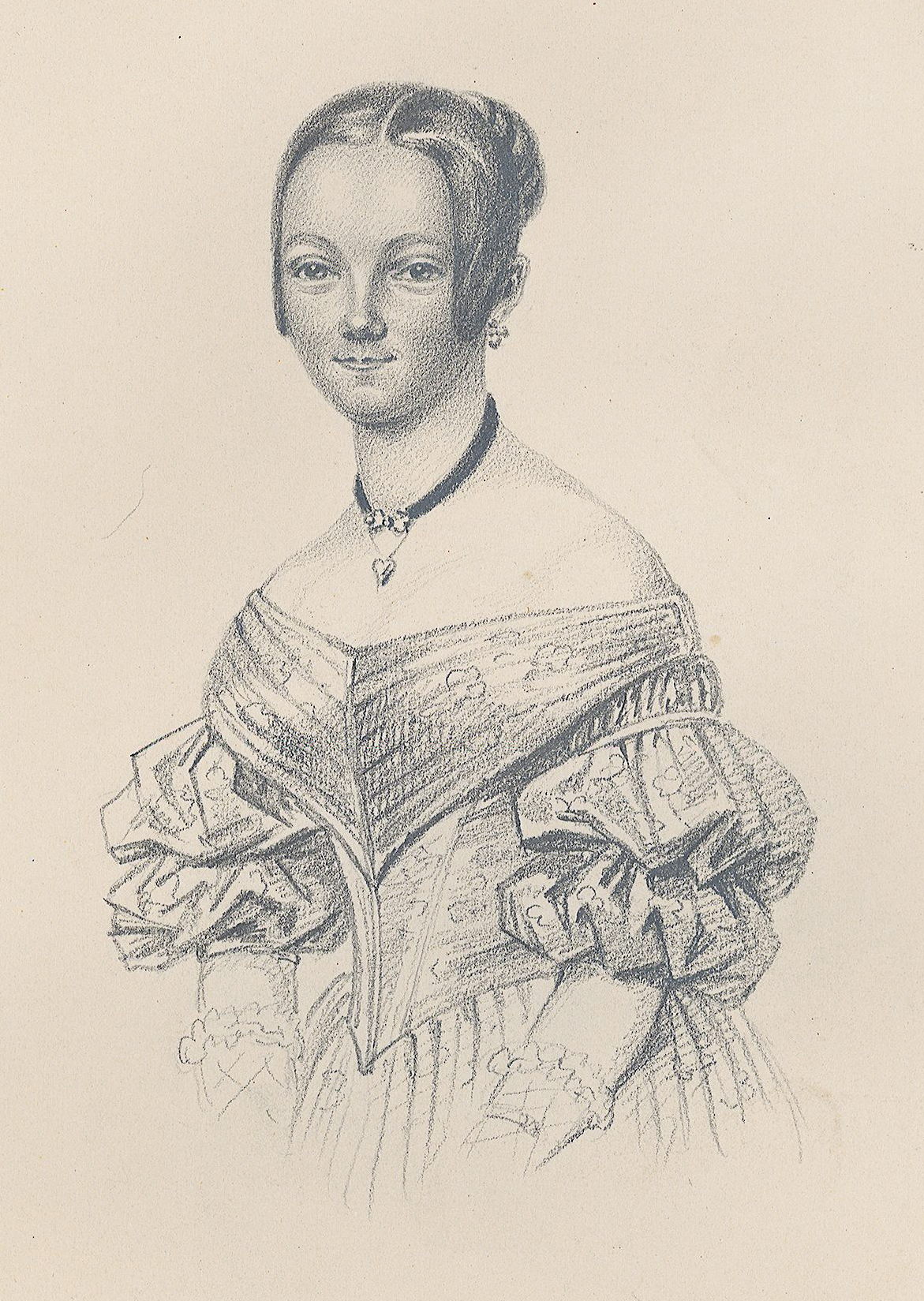
Amalia Höök by Maria Röhl 1839.

Amelie "Malla" Höök (1811–1882) was a Swedish actress and courtesan. She was engaged at the Royal Dramatic Theatre in Stockholm in 1828–1842, and also a well known courtesan. She is often mentioned in theater history for her friendship with Emilie Högqvist.

== Life ==
Malla Höök's father is unknown. She was a student of the Royal Swedish Ballet in 1825–26, a member of the travelling Berggren theater in 1826–28, debuted at the Royal Dramatic theater in 1828, and was active there from 1829 until 1842. She was a personal friend of her colleague Emilie Högqvist, and often mentioned as such. As a stage artist, Malla Höök was described as a dutiful worker and a gifted soubrette actress.

She was however more famed as a courtesan, and was for several years the mistress of a noble diplomat. In 1842, she ended her career at the age of 31, had herself declared of legal majority by royal petition (by the Civil Code of 1734, unmarried women were legal minors unless they petitioned for legal majority) and retired with a great fortune to a comfortable life with her own house in Stockholm and country villa outside Drottningholm, which she eventually left to the official Ludvig Hegardt, who was likely her biological son.
