= Ducange =

Ducange is a surname. Notable people with the surname include:

- Charles du Fresne, sieur du Cange (1610–1688), French philologist
- Victor Henri Joseph Brahain Ducange (1783–1833), French writer
