= Nils Arfwidsson =

Swedish writer (1802–1880)

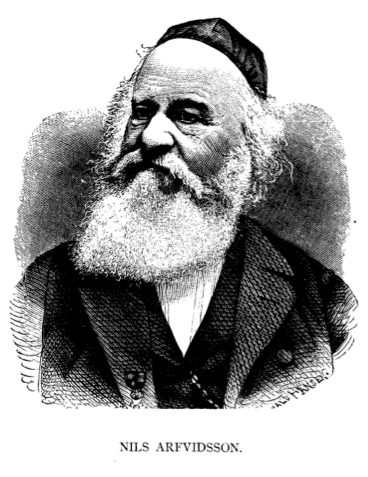
Nils Arfwidsson; Engraving by Evald Hansen (1870s)

Nils Arfwidsson (7 May 1802 in Gothenburg – 14 April 1880 in Stockholm) was a Swedish writer, journalist, and government official.

== Biography ==
He was born to Niklas Arfwidsson, a village counselor, and his wife, Anna Margareta née von Jacobsson, the daughter of a businessman. His family moved to Skara, where his father died in 1813 and they were forced into declaring bankruptcy. His mother died shortly after. Having been given a good education in French and English, he was able to go to Uppsala and pass his Kansliexamen in 1820. However, it soon came to the attention of Count Lars von Engeström that he was a regular visitor to the "Café des Indépendants", a meeting place for radicals, which effectively ended his career prospects.

After failing to enter the diplomatic corps, he began writing art and literary criticism. His writings became popular so, in 1828, the Swedish Academy offered to name him head of the editorial offices for the Post- och Inrikes Tidningar. He was there until 1830, when he received a warning from the government for an article he translated from the Journal des Débats, supporting the July Revolution in France. After that, he became an employee of the Aftonbladet, where he edited the literature and foreign news sections.

Finding himself in constant conflict with the political opinions of its owner, Lars Johan Hierta, in 1832 he joined with his brother-in-law, the journalist Wilhelm Fredric Dalman, in a successful bid to buy the Dagligt Allehanda, a small, but long established liberal newspaper. They planned to build it up into a major forum for liberal ideas, with Arfwidsson responsible for the coverages of cultural affairs and foreign policy. Shortly after acquiring it, however, his first wife Charlotta Lovisa Sjöborg died and, in his sadness, he left to travel abroad; sending home travelogues and articles on art and literature. Dalman would remain as editor until 1848.

In 1839, he gave up his journalistic career and was appointed Secretary of Protocol for His Royal Majesty's Office. He also served with the National Archives until 1853, and at the General Customs Board from 1847 to 1863. He worked as the "scenic curator" at the Royal Swedish Opera for a brief period from 1844 to 1845.

== Selected writings ==
- Nord och söder : strödda anteckningar under resor emellan Avasaxa och Vesuven åren 1835-1839, Two Volumes, Bagge, 1842-1843 (Online)
- Liberté. Egalité. Fraternité: ett ord "mellan drabbningarne", 1867, P.B Eklund (Online)
- Teaterbilder från fordom, published posthumously, Dagligt Allehanda, (Online)

== Sources ==
- Biography from the Svenskt biografiskt handlexikon at Project Runeberg
- Obituary by Harald Wieselgren, in Ur vår samtid at Project Runeberg
