= Carl Gustaf Lindström =

Swedish opera singer

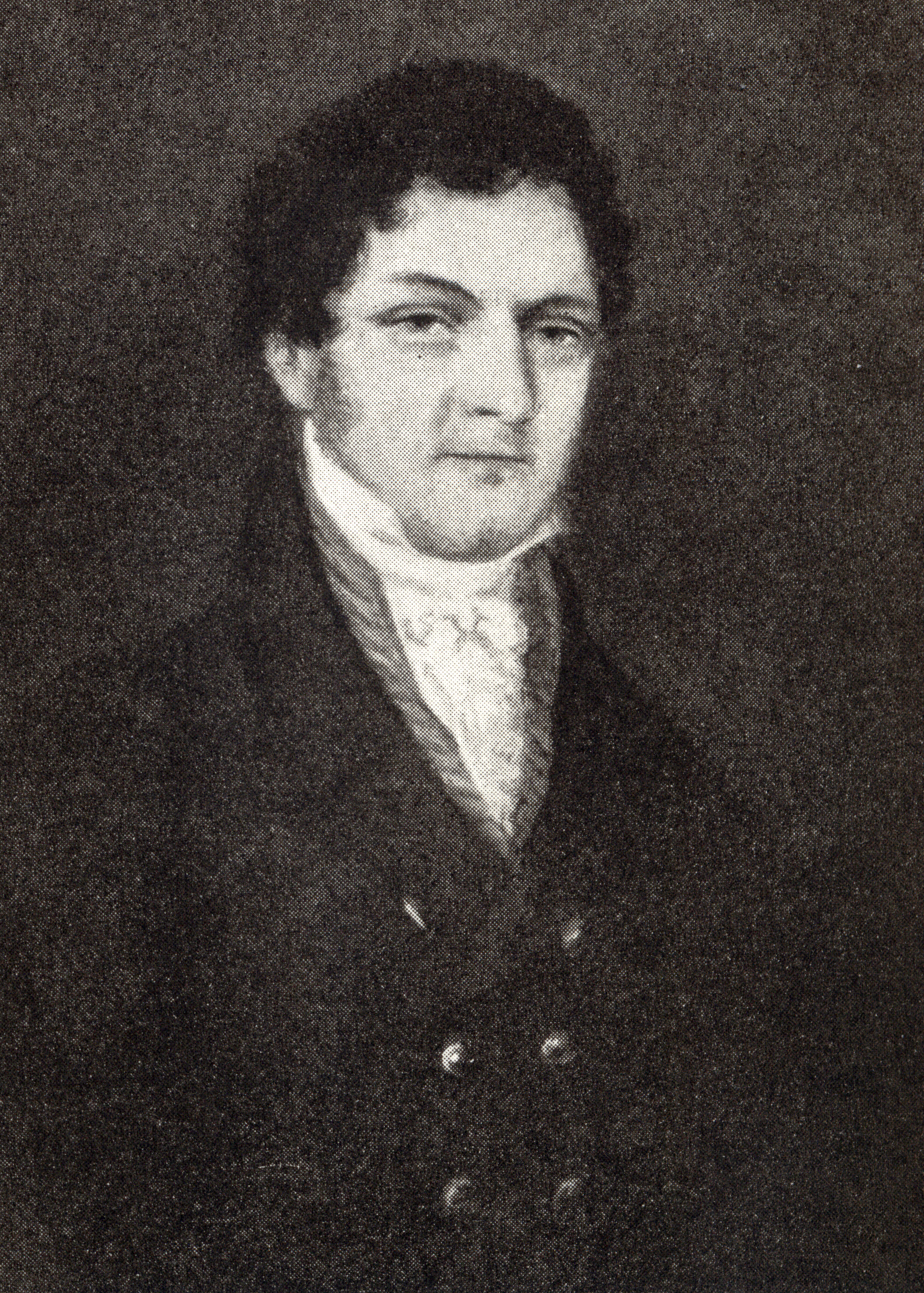

Carl Gustaf Lindström (1779-1855), was a Swedish opera singer (tenor). He was an elite member of the Royal Swedish Opera in 1800-1844, and a Hovsångare. He was described as a tenor with great range of voice and a pleasing appearance and was counted among the most valuable members of the opera for about forty years. He was married to Elise Frösslind.
