= Sara Torsslow =

Swedish actress (1795–1859)

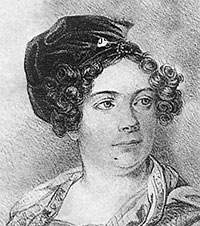
- Born: Sara Fredrica Strömstedt; 11 June 1795; Sweden
- Died: 18 June 1859 (aged 64); Sweden
- Other name: Sara Strömstedt
- Spouse: Ulrik Torsslow

Sara Fredrica Torsslow née Strömstedt (11 June 1795 - 18 June 1859) was a Swedish stage actress. She was one of the most famed actresses in Sweden during the first half of the 19th century, and an elite member of the Royal Dramatic Theatre.

== Life ==
Sara Torsslow was born in Stockholm as the daughter of a spice merchant.

In 1807, at the age of eleven, she was enrolled in the Royal Dramatic Training Academy, where she was instructed by Maria Franck, at that time an elite actress famed as a tragedienne of the Royal Dramatic Theatre.

=== Career at the Royal Dramatic Theatre ===
Sara Torsslow was engaged in the choir of the Royal Swedish Opera in 1811, but after having displayed talent as an actress in supporting roles, she was contracted as a premier actress at the Royal Dramatic Theatre in 1812.

Initially not regarded to have much ability, she developed herself as an actress and rose to become one of the elite members of the theater:

"In possession of a great mind, a healthy judgement and an ability which was only challenged to greater efforts by resistance, she developed her underrated :gifts almost by her own and rose to successively higher levels, particularly within the tragic genre. [...] While useful in almost every line of the art, her :temperament by nature made her most suited for roles within the intense, haunting movements of the soul or those, which demanded that the exposure of the fine :fabric of intrigues, or even those, in which an impressively dignified posture was needed."

Sara Torsslow was to become the leading tragedienne of the Royal Dramatic Theatre, and as such was referred to as the successor of her famous mentor Maria Franck.

She was appreciated for her passionate way of acting and her deep and powerful voice and compared to Adelaide Ristori in her style, and was mostly played tragic roles, where "her male voice, the grand figure, deep emotion and the grotesque gestures could display themselves freely," and the critic Wikström noted her performances to illustrate "an almost terrible, natural truth." She played an appreciated Lady Macbeth and Lucrezia Borgia, and was also popular within breeches roles, in which she was described as very handsome. Sara Torsslow and the star actress Charlotta Eriksson was seen as complementing each other extraordinarily well onstage, and one of their mutual scenes was once commented by Magnus Jacob Crusenstolpe that "the illusion is so complete, that one imagined oneself in reality" with the characters onstage.

In contemporary press, the star actresses Sara Torsslow, Charlotta Eriksson and Elise Frösslind were compared to a rose or a tulip, a jasmine or a daisy, and a lily or a forget-me-not, by which Torsslow was claimed to represent "The Deeply Moving", Eriksson "The Sensitive Grace and Feminine Gracefulness" and Frösslind "The Timid Sweetness, Wit and Naivety".

When the French custom of calling in individual actors with applause after a performance was introduced in Sweden, Sara Torsslow was the first to be called to the stage by the audience this way, after her performance in the play Virginia on 16 January 1825.

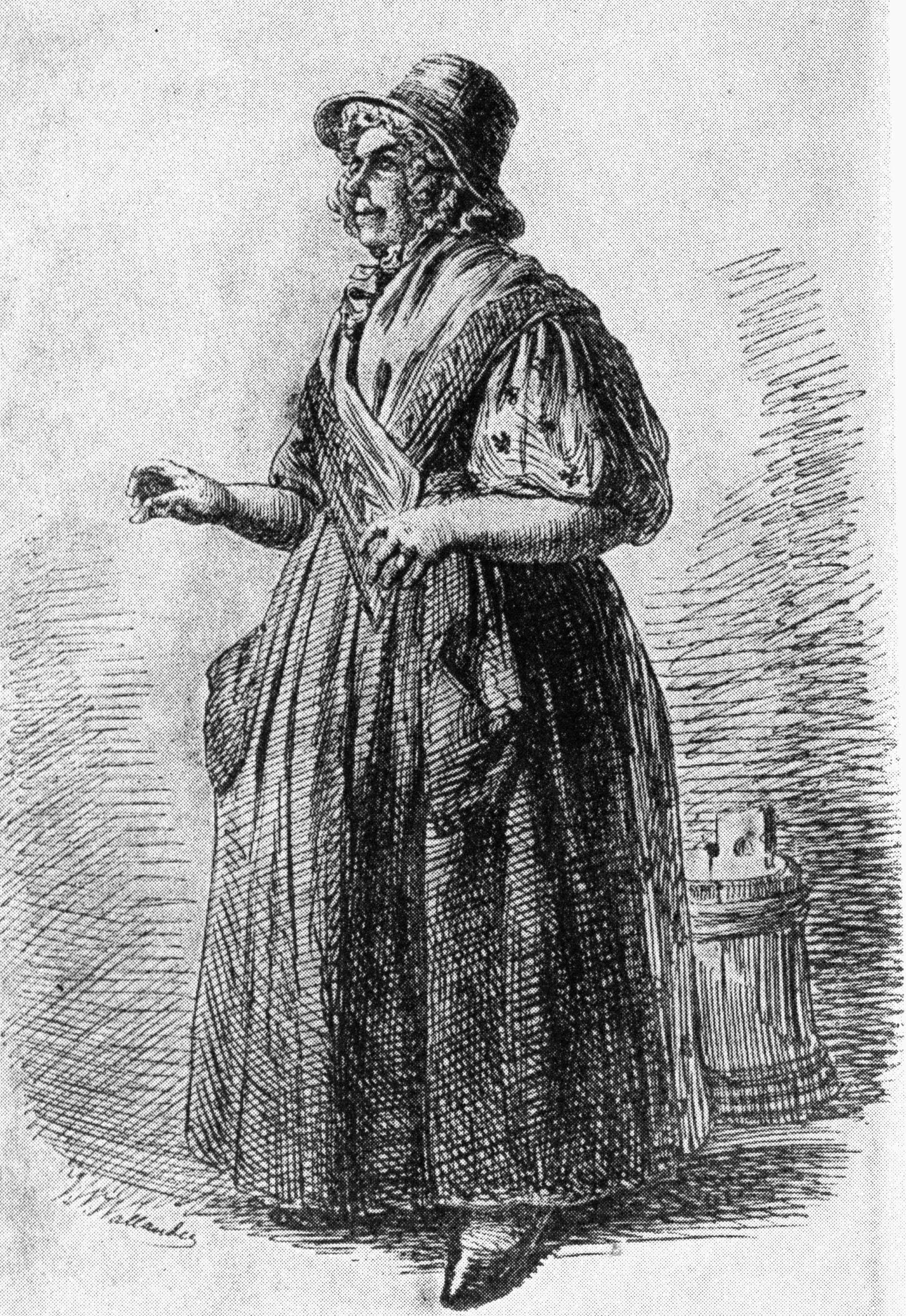
Sara Torsslow as Tant Bazu

She married her colleague, the actor Ulrik Torsslow (1801-1881) in 1830.

=== The Torsslow Arguments ===
In 1827 and 1834, two major strikes - indeed, the biggest strikes in the theatre's history - took place in the "Royal Theaters" (the Royal Swedish Opera and the Royal Dramatic Theatre), referred to as 'First Torsslow Argument' (1827) and 'Second Torsslow Argument' (1834) after the leading figures, Ulrik Torsslow and Sara Torsslow.

In 1827, director Karl Johan Puke introduced reforms in which the benefit performances of the actors (in which the entire income from a performance was given to one of the actors) and the actors' share in the theater was to be replaced by fixed salaries. Both of these reforms was rejected by the majority of the actors, as benefit performances was normally much more lucrative for the majority of actors: further more, Puke made himself immensely disliked by a frequent use of disciplinary rules, such as the right of a director to place an actor in arrest in their dressing room. The Torsslow couple, in their position of star actors, launched a strike in which they demanded the reforms be stopped and the disciplinarian rules abolished. The strike successfully prevented the financial reforms, but the disciplinarian rules were kept with the exception of the arrest, which was abolished for women. The discontent of the disciplinarian system was voiced by Elise Frösslind who, when director Puke asked her if she was satisfied with the settlement replied: "Oh yes, the only thing missing is the flogging."

The plans to introduced the reforms was however not terminated indefinitely, and the second strike of 1834 voiced the same concerns. This time, the management was prepared for the strike and crushed the unity of the participants by raising the salaries of some and firing others. The second strike was therefore defeated, which resulting in the introduction of the reforms, while the participants of the strike was dismissed. Some of the participants, however, were only fired so that they could be hired again for a lower salary, which was illustrated in the cases of the star actors Elise Frösslind and Charlotta Eriksson, who were both fired with the formal motivation that Frösslind was claimed to be too old and of delicate health to fill her obligations, and Eriksson simply because they could no longer afford her. When they were fired, the director admitted informally that they had been so because of their participation in the strike, though he gave other official reasons.

=== Later career ===
Ulrik and Sara Torsslow left the Royal Dramatic Theatre after the strike of 1834, bringing with them a number of leading actors. However, the theater monopoly of 1798 was still in effect in the city of Stockholm, which reserved all professional theatrical activity inside the city borders of Stockholm for the royal theaters. This resulted in the actors being unable to find employment in the city and eventually several of them was forced to ask to return to the Royal Dramatic Theatre, which accepted them back with a lower salary than before the strike: this was for example the case with both Elise Frösslind and Charlotta Eriksson, who returned in 1836. Ulrik and Sara Torsslow initiated a struggle against the royal theater monopoly of 1798 which lasted for eight years and eventually resulted in its abolition.

Initially, they were engaged at the Djurgårdsteatern, a theater which was not regarded as illegal because, firstly, it lay just outside of the city borders and, secondly, it had until that point only been used during the summers. The Torsslows bought the special permit of the theater from Pierre Deland and initially performed there only during the summers and toured the country in winter, but from the 1839 season, they challenged the theater monopoly by performing also in winter. Their initiative was successful and they created theater history when the theater monopoly, which was by then regarded outdated, was abolished in 1842.

In 1843, they became part owners in the new theater founded by Anders Lindeberg when the monopoly was abolished, the Mindre teatern: they took over the management as directors in 1846-54.

Ulrik and Sara Torsslow enjoyed a renewed golden age of their careers at the Mindre teatern, where they were praised by critics as "where the spouses during the tenure of a few years united to a Twin Pair of the First Order in the Sky of Art."

=== Death ===
Sara Torsslow retired in 1853 after a number of repeated colds which undermined her health, colds she is said to have contracted during the many performances in thin clothes on drafty and cold stages. She died six years later. Her husband Ulrik Torsslow returned to the Royal Dramatic Theatre in 1856 and retired in 1861. Their private life was said to have been very happy, but their income poor. She was the mother of the actress Helfrid Kinmansson and the maternal grandmother of the actress Valborg Moberg.

Upon her death, her career was described: "As the genius of Schiller created Elizabeth of England, speaking in the halls of her castle with Leicester, or in the park of Fotheringay with May Stuart, such was the living image of Elizabeth in the performance of Mrs T. at the Royal Dramatic Theater; as Victor Hugo portrayed Gudule in Notre-Dame with the eye of his imagination, such did Mrs T. portray her at Mindre teatern; and as Scribe painted the Princess, in which his famed play which, suited for the Swedish stage named »Strozzi och Martino», named the dowager duchess, so was she painted by Mrs T. at the Djurgårdsteatern. Every time she performed, the stage was in triumph and [sic?] salon was given a true festivity.»
