= 1978 in film =

The year 1978 in film involved some significant events.

== Events ==
- February 6 – David Begelman resigns as president of Columbia Pictures.
- March 1 – Charlie Chaplin's coffin is stolen from a Swiss cemetery three months after burial. After recovery a few weeks later, the casket is sealed in a concrete vault prior to reburial.
- March – Leigh Brackett completes the first draft for The Empire Strikes Back, but dies only two weeks later.
- June – Daniel Melnick becomes head of Columbia Pictures after the David Begelman scandal.
- June 4 – Grease, starring John Travolta and Olivia Newton-John, has its world premiere at Grauman's Chinese Theatre in Hollywood. It becomes the highest-grossing musical ever and Paramount Pictures' highest-grossing film.
- July 20 – Alan Hirschfield is fired as president and CEO of Columbia Pictures. He is replaced by Francis T. Vincent.
- August – Production begins on Star Trek: The Motion Picture.
- September – George Lucas purchases Bulltail Ranch, on Lucas Valley Road, for the development of Skywalker Ranch.
- October 25 – Halloween is released.
- November 17 – A Star Wars Holiday Special is broadcast on CBS in the United States. The special gives fans their first glimpse of Boba Fett, a character from the forthcoming sequel, but the special received negative reviews upon airing.
- December 10 – Superman premieres at the Kennedy Center in Washington, D.C., and has a European Royal Charity Premiere at the Empire, Leicester Square in London three days later in the presence of Queen Elizabeth II and the then Prince Andrew, Duke of York (later Andrew Mountbatten-Windsor).

== Awards ==
Category/Organization	36th Golden Globe Awards January 27, 1979		32nd BAFTA Awards March 22, 1979	51st Academy Awards April 9, 1979
Category/Organization	Drama	Musical or Comedy	32nd BAFTA Awards March 22, 1979	51st Academy Awards April 9, 1979
Best Film	Midnight Express	Heaven Can Wait	Julia	The Deer Hunter
Best Director	Michael Cimino; The Deer Hunter		Alan Parker; Midnight Express	Michael Cimino; The Deer Hunter
Best Actor	Jon Voight; Coming Home	Warren Beatty; Heaven Can Wait	Richard Dreyfuss; The Goodbye Girl	Jon Voight; Coming Home
Best Actress	Jane Fonda; Coming Home	Ellen Burstyn; Same Time, Next Year; Maggie Smith; California Suite	Jane Fonda; Julia	Jane Fonda; Coming Home
Best Supporting Actor	John Hurt; Midnight Express			Christopher Walken; The Deer Hunter
Best Supporting Actress	Dyan Cannon; Heaven Can Wait		Geraldine Page; Interiors	Maggie Smith; California Suite
Best Screenplay, Adapted	Oliver Stone; Midnight Express		Alvin Sargent; Julia	Oliver Stone; Midnight Express
Best Screenplay, Original	Oliver Stone; Midnight Express		Alvin Sargent; Julia	Nancy Dowd, Waldo Salt and Robert C. Jones; Coming Home
Best Original Score	Giorgio Moroder; Midnight Express		John Williams; Star Wars	Giorgio Moroder; Midnight Express; Joe Renzetti; The Buddy Holly Story
Best Original Song	"Last Dance"; Thank God It's Friday		N/A	"Last Dance"; Thank God It's Friday
Best Foreign Language Film	Autumn Sonata		N/A	Get Out Your Handkerchiefs
Best Documentary	N/A	N/A	The Silent Witness	Scared Straight!

Palme d'Or (Cannes Film Festival):

The Tree of Wooden Clogs (L'Albero degli zoccoli), directed by Ermanno Olmi, Italy

Golden Bear (Berlin Film Festival):

Ascensor, directed by Tomás Muñoz, Spain
Trout (Las Truchas), directed by José Luis García Sánchez, Spain
What Max Said (Las Palabras de Max), directed by Emilio Martínez-Lázaro, Spain

People's Choice Award (Toronto International Film Festival):

Girlfriends, directed by Claudia Weill, United States

== Highest-grossing films (U.S.) ==
The top ten 1978 released films by box office gross in the United States and Canada are as follows:

Highest-grossing films of 1978
Rank	Title	Distributor	Box-office gross
1	Grease	Paramount	$159,978,870
2	Superman	Warner Bros.	$134,218,018
3	National Lampoon's Animal House	Universal	$120,091,123
4	Every Which Way but Loose	Warner Bros.	$85,196,485
5	Heaven Can Wait	Paramount	$81,640,278
6	Hooper	Warner Bros.	$78,000,000
7	Jaws 2	Universal	$77,737,272
8	Revenge of the Pink Panther	United Artists	$49,579,269
9	The Deer Hunter	Universal	$48,979,328
10	Halloween	Compass International	$47,000,000

== 1978 films ==
=== By country/region ===
- List of American films of 1978
- List of Argentine films of 1978
- List of Australian films of 1978
- List of Bangladeshi films of 1978
- List of British films of 1978
- List of Canadian films of 1978
- List of French films of 1978
- List of Hong Kong films of 1978
- List of Indian films of 1978
  - List of Hindi films of 1978
  - List of Kannada films of 1978
  - List of Malayalam films of 1978
  - List of Marathi films of 1978
  - List of Tamil films of 1978
  - List of Telugu films of 1978
- List of Japanese films of 1978
- List of Mexican films of 1978
- List of Pakistani films of 1978
- List of South Korean films of 1978
- List of Soviet films of 1978
- List of Spanish films of 1978

=== By genre/medium ===
- List of action films of 1978
- List of animated feature films of 1978
- List of avant-garde films of 1978
- List of comedy films of 1978
- List of drama films of 1978
- List of horror films of 1978
- List of science fiction films of 1978
- List of thriller films of 1978
- List of western films of 1978

== Births ==
- January 1 – Christian Tessier, Canadian actor
- January 2
  - Raghda Khateb, Syrian voice actress
  - Megumi Toyoguchi, Japanese voice actress
- January 3 – Kimberley Locke, American singer-songwriter and model
- January 5
  - Clarine Harp, American voice actress
  - January Jones, American actress and model
  - America Olivo, American actress and singer
- January 6 – Tara Spencer-Nairn, Canadian actress
- January 8 – Scott Whyte, American actor
- January 9
  - AJ McLean, American musician, singer, dancer, actor, and entertainer
  - Adam Sztykiel, American producer and screenwriter
- January 10 – Antonio Cupo, Canadian film and television actor
- January 11 - Adepero Oduye, American actress, director, singer and writer
- January 15
  - Eddie Cahill, American actor
  - Jamie Clayton, American actress, model
- January 17
  - Pampita, Argentine model, actress, television personality
  - Takatoshi Kaneko, Japanese actor
  - Ricky Wilson, English actor, singer
- January 20 – Omar Sy, French actor
- January 24
  - Mark Hildreth, Canadian actor, voice actor
  - Kristen Schaal, American actress, comedian and writer
- January 25 – Volodymyr Zelenskyy, Ukrainian actor and politician
- January 26 - Kelly Stables, American actress
- January 27 – Jake Pavelka, American pilot, television personality
- January 28 – Stephen Farrelly, Irish actor and professional wrestler
- February 2 - Rich Sommer, American actor
- February 7 – Ashton Kutcher, American actor
- February 10 - Don Omar, Puerto Rican singer, rapper and actor
- February 12 –
  - Paul Anderson, British actor
  - Gethin Jones, Welsh television presenter
- February 14 – Danai Gurira, actress, playwright
- February 17
  - Ashton Holmes, American actor
  - Rory Kinnear, English actor and playwright
- February 20
  - Lauren Ambrose, American actress
  - Jay Hernandez, American actor
  - Julia Jentsch, German actress
  - Chelsea Peretti, American comedian, actress, television writer and singer-songwriter
- February 23 – Kris Lemche, Canadian actor
- February 24 – Nicole Lyn, Canadian actress
- February 28 - Geoffrey Arend, American actor
- March 1 – Jensen Ackles, American actor
- March 3 – Aarti Mann, Indian-American actress
- March 5 – Kimberly McCullough, American actress, dancer, director
- March 8 – Nick Zano, American actor
- March 9 – Katherine Parkinson, English actress
- March 10 - Harley Cross, American actor and producer
- March 11 - Javier Godino, Spanish actor
- March 12 - Camille Anderson, American actress and television host
- March 16 – Sophie Hunter, English actress and singer
- March 17 – Patrick Seitz, American voice actor
- March 21
  - Kevin Federline, American rapper, DJ, actor and professional wrestler
  - Rani Mukerji, Indian actress
- March 23 – Nicholle Tom and David Tom, American actress and actor
- March 24 – Amanda Brugel, Canadian actress
- March 25
  - Teddy Lussi-Modeste, French film director, screenwriter and literature teacher
  - Maribeth Monroe, American actress, writer and comedian
- March 31 – Daniel Mays, English actor
- April 2 – Deon Richmond, American actor
- April 3 – Matthew Goode, English actor
- April 6 - Lauren Ridloff, deaf American actress
- April 7
  - Duncan James, English actor, television presenter and singer
  - Scott McGillivray, Canadian television host
- April 8 – Paola Núñez, Mexican actress and producer
- April 12 – Riley Smith, American actor
- April 13 – Kyle Howard, American actor
- April 14 - Michelle Duncan, Scottish-Canadian actress
- April 16 – Lara Dutta, Indian actress
- April 17 – Ido Mosseri, Israeli actor, singer and musician
- April 19
  - James Franco, American actor
  - Joanna Gaines, American designer, businesswoman, entrepreneur, television personality
- April 20
  - Matt Austin, Canadian actor
  - Clayne Crawford, American actor
- April 23 – Ian Brennan, American writer, actor, producer
- April 26
  - Stana Katic, Canadian-American actress and producer
  - Anna Mouglalis, French actress
  - Pablo Schreiber, Canadian actor
- April 28
  - Nate Richert, American actor, musician
  - Drew Scott, Canadian actor, realtor, and entrepreneur
  - Jonathan Scott, Canadian reality television personality, contractor, illusionist, and television and film producer
- April 29 – Tyler Labine, Canadian actor
- April 30 – Sandra Huller, German actress
- May 2 - Kumail Nanjiani, Pakistani-American comedian, actor and screenwriter
- May 4 – Daisuke Ono, Japanese voice actor and singer
- May 5 – Santiago Cabrera, Venezuelan-born Chilean actor
- May 8
  - Matthew Davis, American actor
  - Ana Maria Lombo, American musician and television personality
  - Josie Maran, American model, actress, and entrepreneur
- May 9 – Daniel Franzese, American actor, comedian and activist
- May 10 – Kenan Thompson, American actor, comedian
- May 11 – Warren Brown, English actor and former professional Thai boxer
- May 12
  - Aaron Abrams, Canadian actor, writer
  - Malin Åkerman, Swedish-Canadian actress
  - Jason Biggs, American actor
- May 15
  - Caroline Dhavernas, Canadian actress
  - David Krumholtz, American actor
- May 16 – Jim Sturgess, English actor
- May 17
  - Gabriel Hogan, Canadian-born American actor
  - Kat Foster, American actress
- May 18 – Chad Donella, Canadian actor
- May 21 – Chris Santos, American actor
- May 22 – Ginnifer Goodwin, American actress
- May 24 – Bryan Greenberg, American actor
- May 26 - Laurence Fox, English actor
- May 28 – Jake Johnson, actor, comedian
- May 29 – Adam Rickitt, English actor, singer and model
- June 2
  - Dominic Cooper, English actor
  - Nikki Cox, American actress
  - Justin Long, American actor
- June 4
  - Josh McDermitt, American film and television actor and comedian
  - Robin Lord Taylor, American actor
- June 5
  - Nick Kroll, American actor, comedian, writer and producer
  - Jeff Schroeder, American television and online talk show host
- June 6 - Judith Barsi, American child actress (d. 1988)
- June 7
  - Bill Hader, American actor, comedian
  - Anna Torv, Australian actress
- June 8 – Maria Menounos, American actress
- June 9 – Michaela Conlin, American actress
- June 10
  - DJ Qualls, American actor
  - Shane West, American actor
  - Marko Zaror, Chilean martial artist and actor
- June 11 – Joshua Jackson, Canadian actor
- June 12 - Timothy Simons, American actor and comedian
- June 13 – Ethan Embry, American actor
- June 14 - Diablo Cody, Canadian writer
- June 16 – Daniel Brühl, German actor
- June 18 – Tara Platt, American voice actress
- June 19
  - Mía Maestro, Argentine actress and singer-songwriter
  - Zoe Saldaña, American actress
- June 20
  - Quinton Jackson, American mixed martial artist, actor and former professional wrestler
  - Mike Birbiglia, American stand-up comedian, actor, and writer
- June 21 – Erica Durance, Canadian actress
- June 27 – Courtney Ford, American actress
- June 28 – Ha Ji-won, South Korean actress
- June 29 –
  - Luke Kirby, Canadian actor
  - Nicole Scherzinger, American singer, songwriter, dancer, actress and television personality
- July 2 – Owain Yeoman, Welsh actor
- July 3 – Ian Anthony Dale, American actor
- July 4
  - Becki Newton, American actress
- July 6
  - Adam Busch, American actor, film director and singer
  - Tia Mowry and Tamera Mowry, American actresses
- July 9 – Kyle Davis, American actor
- July 11
  - Dustin Demri-Burns, English actor, comedian, and writer
  - Jonjo O'Neill, Irish actor
  - Thomas Stone, Hungarian pornographic actor
- July 12
  - Topher Grace, American actor
  - Michelle Rodriguez, American actress
- July 15 – Greg Sestero, American actor, writer
- July 17 – Justine Triet, French film director, screenwriter and editor
- July 18 - Eugene Cordero, American comedian, actor and writer
- July 20
  - Charlie Korsmo, American former child actor
  - Anatol Yusef, English stage, film and television actor
- July 21
  - Justin Bartha, American actor
  - Josh Hartnett, American actor
- July 23 - Pearry Reginald Teo, Singaporean filmmaker (d. 2023)
- July 24 – Jeff Mauro, American actor, chef
- July 29 - Paul King, British writer and director
- August 2 – Natashia Williams, American actress, model
- August 3
  - Tommy Dewey, American actor, producer, writer
  - Shanelle Workman, American actress, voice actress, producer and director
- August 6 – Lee Ji-ah, South Korean actress
- August 8 – Countess Vaughn, American actress
- August 10
  - Leo Fitzpatrick, American actor
  - Alison Folland, American actress and filmmaker
- August 18 – Andy Samberg, American actor, comedian
- August 19 - Michelle Borth, American actress
- August 20 – Kris Smith, English Australian model, television presenter and rugby league footballer
- August 22 – James Corden, English singer, actor, television host
- August 23
  - Kobe Bryant, American actor and basketball player (d. 2020)
  - Andrew Rannells, American actor, voice actor, singer
- August 24 – Beth Riesgraf, American actress
- August 25 – Kel Mitchell, American actor, comedian
- August 28 – Sam Wills, New Zealand prop comic, busker, clown and mime
- August 30 – Gianpaolo Venuta, Canadian actor
- August 31 – Mike Erwin, American actor
- September 1 - Nathalie Cox, British actress
- September 3 – Nick Wechsler, American actor
- September 4 – Wes Bentley, American actor
- September 5
  - Laura Bertram, Canadian actress
  - Yu Nan, Chinese actress
- September 12 – Benjamin McKenzie, American actor
- September 16
  - Carolina Dieckmann, Brazilian actress
  - Michael Mosley, American actor
- September 18 – Billy Eichner, American comedian, actor, writer, and television personality
- September 20 – Charlie Weber, American actor
- September 21 – Paulo Costanzo, Canadian actor
- September 22 – Daniella Alonso, American actress and fashion model
- September 23 – Anthony Mackie, American actor
- September 24 - Christopher Nowinski, American author, co-founder and executive director of the Concussion Legacy Foundation; as well as a former professional wrestler with World Wrestling Entertainment
- September 25 – Rossif Sutherland, Canadian actor
- September 28 – Lucas Bryant, Canadian actor
- September 29 – Nathan West, American actor
- September 30 - Stark Sands, American actor
- October 1 – Katie Aselton, American actress, film director and producer
- October 3
  - Christian Coulson, English actor
  - Shannyn Sossamon, American actress
- October 6 - October 7
  - Tommy Campbell, Canadian-Irish actor, stand-up comedian and writer
  - Lindsey Pearlman, American actress (d. 2022)
- October 7
  - Joe Armstrong, English actor
  - Hattie Morahan, English actress
  - Tony Way, English actor, comedian and writer
- October 9 – Randy Spelling, American actor
- October 10
  - Trevor Eyster, American actor
  - Edan Gross, American former child actor
  - Jodi Lyn O'Keefe, American actress
- October 11
  - Wes Chatham, American actor
  - Trevor Donovan, American actor
- October 14 – Usher, American singer, actor
- October 15
  - Devon Gummersall, American actor
  - Matt Lutz, American actor
- October 18
  - Gloria Garayua, American actress
  - Wesley Jonathan, American actor
- October 21
  - Will Estes, American actor
  - Michael McMillian, American actor
- October 26 –
  - CM Punk, American mixed martial artist, comic book writer and retired professional wrestler
  - Anthony Carrino, American contractor, designer, developer and television personality
- October 27 – David Walton, American actor
- October 28
  - Gwendoline Christie, English actress and model
  - Justin Guarini, American singer and actor
- October 30 - Matthew Morrison, American singer, actor
- October 31 – Brian Hallisay, American actor
- November 1 – Mary Kate Schellhardt, American actress
- November 2
  - Oliver Chris, English actor
  - Whit Hertford, American theatre director, writer and actor
- November 6 - Taryn Manning, American actress and singer
- November 7 - Will Gluck, American director, producer, screenwriter and composer
- November 8 – Keir O'Donnell, Australian-American actor
- November 9 – Sisqó, American singer, actor, songwriter
  - Diplo, American actor, DJ, record producer, rapper, songwriter
- November 12 – Nicolas Giraud, French actor and filmmaker
- November 13 - Marit Velle Kile, Norwegian former actress
- November 17
  - Nonso Anozie, British actor
  - Zoë Bell, New Zealand stuntwoman, actress
  - Tom Ellis, Welsh actor
  - Rachel McAdams, Canadian actress
- November 19 – Eric Nenninger, American actor
- November 20 - Nadine Velazquez, American actress and model
- November 21 – Yasmine Al Massri, International actress, dancer, video artist and human rights advocate
- November 23
  - Destin Daniel Cretton, American filmmaker
  - Kayvan Novak, British actor, voice actor, and comedian
- November 24 – Katherine Heigl, American actress
- November 25 – Taís Araújo, Brazilian actress
- November 26 – Jun Fukuyama, Japanese voice actor and singer
- November 28 – Jodie Resther, Canadian actress
- November 30 - Gael García Bernal, Mexican film actor, director, and producer
- December 7
  - Shiri Appleby, American actress
  - Kristofer Hivju, Norwegian film actor, producer and writer
- December 8 – Ian Somerhalder, American actor
- December 9 – Jesse Metcalfe, American actor
- December 10
  - Summer Phoenix, American actress
  - Elizabeth Stanley, American actress
- December 11 - Courtney Henggeler, American former actress
- December 12 - Gbenga Akinnagbe, American actor and writer
- December 13 – Cameron Douglas, American actor
- December 15 – Will Wikle, American actor and reality television personality
- December 16 – Joe Absolom, English actor
- December 17 – Douglas Tait, American actor, stuntman, filmmaker
- December 18
  - Josh Dallas, American actor
  - Katie Holmes, American actress
  - Ravi Patel, American actor
- December 21
  - Charles Dera, American pornographic actor, dancer, model, martial artist, and former U.S. Marine
  - Mike Vitar, American actor
- December 22 – Mia Tyler, American actress, model, author, visual artist, media personality, socialite, fashion designer, talent manager and music promoter
- December 23 - Josh Cowdery, American actor
- December 24
  - Jessica Oyelowo, British-American actress and singer
  - Carlson twins, American actors, models
- December 25 – Jeremy Strong, American film, television, and stage actor
- December 27 - Lisa Jakub, Canadian writer and former actress
- December 28 – John Legend, American composer and actor
- December 30 – Tyrese Gibson, American actor, singer, model
- December 31 – Johnny Sins, pornographic actor, director, and Internet personality

== Deaths ==
Month
Date
Name
Age
Country
Profession
Notable films
January
5
Sally Eilers
69
US
Actress
- Bad Girl
- The Black Camel
12
Arthur Sheekman
76
US
Screenwriter
- Duck Soup
- Some Came Running
23
Jack Oakie
74
US
Actor
- The Great Dictator
- Lover Come Back
26
Leo Genn
72
UK
Actor
- Quo Vadis
- The Longest Day
27
Oskar Homolka
79
Austria
Actor
- Sabotage
- I Remember Mama
29
Tim McCoy
86
US
Actor
- Texas Cyclone
- Two-Fisted Law
February
2
Wendy Barrie
69
UK
Actress
- The Hound of the Baskervilles
- The Private Life of Henry VIII
14
Claude Binyon
72
US
Writer, Director
- The Saxon Charm
- Dreamboat
15
Ilka Chase
77
US
Actress
- Now, Voyager
- Ocean's 11
18
Kathleen Lockhart
83
UK
Actress
- A Christmas Carol
- Bewitched
18
Maggie McNamara
48
US
Actress
- The Moon Is Blue
- Three Coins in the Fountain
24
Franco Arcalli
48
Italy
Screenwriter
- Last Tango in Paris
- Zabriskie Point
28
Philip Ahn
72
US
Actor
- Never So Few
- Paradise, Hawaiian Style
March
12
John Cazale
42
US
Actor
- The Godfather
- Dog Day Afternoon
16
Reb Russell
72
US
Actor
- Range Warfare
- Border Vengeance
18
Peggy Wood
86
US
Actress
- The Sound of Music
- The Story of Ruth
24
Leigh Brackett
62
US
Screenwriter
- The Big Sleep
- The Empire Strikes Back
25
Leslie Fenton
76
UK
Actor, Director
- Boys Town
- Whispering Smith
25
Jack Hulbert
85
UK
Actor
- Bulldog Jack
- Jack Ahoy
25
Hanna Ralph
92
Germany
Actress
- Faust
- Helena
31
Astrid Allwyn
72
US
Actress
- Follow the Fleet
- Love Affair
April
1
Lynne Roberts
56
US
Actress
- Girls of the Big House
- Port Sinister
9
Michael Wilson
63
US
Screenwriter
- The Bridge on the River Kwai
- Lawrence of Arabia
13
Paul McGrath
74
US
Actor
- A Face in the Crowd
- Advise & Consent
22
Will Geer
76
US
Actor
- Winchester '73
- Bandolero!
May
6
Loyal Griggs
71
US
Cinematographer
- White Christmas
- Shane

11
Philip Ray
79
UK
Actor
- A Night to Remember
- Dracula: Prince of Darkness

12
Robert Coogan
53
US
Actor
- Skippy
- Johnny Doughboy

16
Robert Florey
78
France
Director
- The Cocoanuts
- Murders in the Rue Morgue
June
20
Mark Robson
64
Canada
Director
- Peyton Place
- The Inn of the Sixth Happiness
29
Bob Crane
49
US
Actor
- Gus
- Superdad
30
Frank Santillo
65
US
Editor
- Grand Prix
- Junior Bonner
July
3
James Daly
59
US
Actor
- Planet of the Apes
- The Big Bounce
14
Jack Woolgar
64
UK
Actor
- Death Line
17
Thayer David
51
US
Actor
- Rocky
- The Eiger Sanction
19
Agnes Christine Johnston
82
US
Screenwriter
- Life Begins for Andy Hardy
- Black Beauty
August
5
Queenie Smith
79
US
Actress
- Mississippi
- The Killers
13
Ferenc Kiss
86
Hungary
Actor
- Cafe Moscow
- The Talking Rob
23
Agustín Isunza
77
Mexico
Actor
- El Topo
- Wild Flower
24
Louis Prima
67
US
Actor, Singer
- The Jungle Book
- Rose of Washington Square
26
Charles Boyer
78
France
Actor
- Gaslight
- Algiers
28
Robert Shaw
51
UK
Actor
- Jaws
- The Sting
31
Lee Garmes
80
US
Cinematographer
- Detective Story
- A Big Hand for the Little Lady
September
3
Karin Molander
89
Sweden
Actress
- Halvblod
- Erotikon
9
Jack L. Warner
86
Canada
Producer, Studio Executive
- My Fair Lady
- Camelot
12
Frank Ferguson
78
US
Actor
- Rancho Notorious
- The Good Humor Man
18
Ann Shoemaker
87
US
Actress
- Sunrise at Campobello
- Alice Adams
24
Ruth Etting
80
US
Singer, Actress
- Roman Scandals
- Gift of Gab
30
Edgar Bergen
75
US
Actor, Ventriloquist
- The Muppet Movie
- Fun and Fancy Free
October
10
Kathryn McGuire
74
US
Actress
- Sherlock Jr.
- The Navigator
16
Dan Dailey
62
US
Actor
- It's Always Fair Weather
- There's No Business Like Show Business
19
Gig Young
64
US
Actor
- They Shoot Horses Don't They
- That Touch of Mink
30
Brian Hayles
47
UK
Screenwriter
- Warlords of Atlantis
- Arabian Adventure
November
5
Denis O'Dea
73
Ireland
Actor
- Esther and the King
- Niagara
9
Florence Marly
59
Czechoslovakia
Actress
- Sealed Verdict
- Tokyo Joe
16
Claude Dauphin
75
France
Actor
- Barbarella
- Grand Prix
20
Robert Alan Aurthur
56
US
Screenwriter
- Grand Prix
- All That Jazz
23
June Martel
69
US
Actress
- Fighting Youth
- Santa Fe Stampede
26
Ford Beebe
90
US
Director
- The Green Hornet
- Buck Rogers
27
Susan Shaw
44
UK
Actress
- Wide Boy
- Fire Maidens from Outer Space
28
André Morell
69
UK
Actor
- The Bridge on the River Kwai
- The Hound of the Baskervilles
December
7
I. Stanford Jolley
78
US
Actor
- King of the Rocket Men
- I Killed Wild Bill Hickok
10
Ed Wood
54
US
Director, Screenwriter, Actor
- Glen or Glenda
- Plan 9 from Outer Space
12
Fay Compton
84
UK
Actress
- Othello
- The Haunting
15
Chill Wills
76
US
Actor
- The Alamo
- Giant
19
Duncan Lamont
60
UK
Actor
- Frankenstein Created Woman
- Battle of Britain
23
Louis de Rochemont
89
US
Producer
- Windjammer
- The Roman Spring of Mrs. Stone

== Film debuts ==
- Philip Akin – Three Card Monte
- Karen Allen – National Lampoon's Animal House
- Pedro Almodóvar (director) – Folle...folle...fólleme Tim!
- María Conchita Alonso – Savana – Sesso e diamanti
- Tomas Arana – Blood Feud
- Kevin Bacon – National Lampoon's Animal House
- Jonathan Banks – Coming Home
- Ellen Barkin – Up in Smoke
- Frances Bay – Foul Play
- Jim Belushi – The Fury
- Gregg Berger – Attack of the Killer Tomatoes
- Michael Biehn – Coach
- Roy Brocksmith – The Rip-Off
- Jake Busey – Straight Time
- John Capodice – Rush It
- Tantoo Cardinal – Marie-Anne
- Tommy Chong – Up in Smoke
- Billy Connolly – Absolution
- Billy Crystal – Rabbit Test
- Jamie Lee Curtis – Halloween
- E. G. Daily – Jukebox
- Daniel Dantas – Tudo Bem
- Eddie Deezen – Laserblast
- Julie Delpy – Guerres civiles en France
- R. Lee Ermey – The Boys in Company C
- Corey Feldman – Born Again
- Tovah Feldshuh – Nunzio
- William Forsythe – Long Shot
- Joe Grifasi – The Deer Hunter
- Daryl Hannah – The Fury
- Mark Harmon – Comes a Horseman
- Woody Harrelson – Harper Valley PTA
- Ed Harris – Coma
- Phil Hartman – Stunt Rock
- Gregg Henry – Mean Dog Blues
- Mary Beth Hurt – Interiors
- Michael Jackson - The Wiz
- Karl Johnson – Jubilee
- John Kani – The Wild Geese
- Michael Keaton – Rabbit Test
- Irwin Keyes – Manny's Orphans
- Terry Kinney – A Wedding
- John Malkovich – A Wedding
- Joe Mantegna – Towing
- Cheech Marin – Up in Smoke
- Laurie Metcalf – A Wedding
- Liam Neeson – Pilgrim's Progress
- Natalia Nogulich – Stony Island
- Deborah Offner – Rush It
- Michael O'Keefe – Gray Lady Down
- Mandy Patinkin – The Big Fix
- Roddy Piper – The One and Only
- Tony Plana – The Boss's Son
- Annie Potts – Corvette Summer
- Robert Prosky – The Brink's Job
- David Rasche – An Unmarried Woman
- Christopher Reeve – Gray Lady Down
- James Remar – On the Yard
- Jean Reno – The Hypothesis of the Stolen Painting
- Peter Riegert – National Lampoon's Animal House
- Eric Roberts – King of the Gypsies
- Deborah Rush – Oliver's Story
- Diana Scarwid – Pretty Baby
- Gary Sinise – A Wedding
- James Spader – Team-Mates
- Mary Steenburgen – Goin' South
- Peter Stormare – The Score
- Carel Struycken – Sgt. Pepper's Lonely Hearts Club Band
- Rachel Ticotin – King of the Gypsies
- Chick Vennera – Thank God It's Friday
- Tom Waits – Paradise Alley
- Alberta Watson – Power Play
- Norbert Weisser – Midnight Express
- George Wendt – A Wedding
- Toyah Willcox – Jubilee
- Alfre Woodard – Remember My Name
- Grace Zabriskie – They Went That-A-Way & That-A-Way
- Robert Zemeckis (director) – I Wanna Hold Your Hand
