= Gösta Berling's Saga =

Swedish novel

- Author: Selma Lagerlöf
- Language: Swedish
- Set in: Värmland, Sweden
- Published: 1891
- Publication place: Sweden

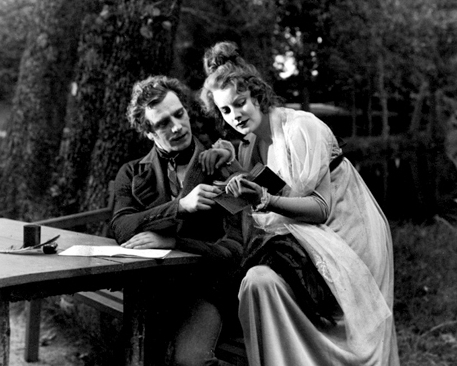
Greta Garbo in a 1924 film adaptation, her first major role

Gösta Berling's Saga (Swedish: Gösta Berlings saga [ˈjœ̂sːta ˈbæ̂ːɭɪŋs ˈsɑ̂ːɡa]), also known as The Story of Gösta Berling or The Saga of Gösta Berling, is the debut novel of Swedish Nobel Prize-winning author Selma Lagerlöf, published in 1891. It was made into a 1924 silent film directed by Mauritz Stiller starring Greta Garbo (in her first leading role in a film), Lars Hanson and Gerda Lundequist. A 1925 opera I cavalieri di Ekebù by Riccardo Zandonai was also based on it.

== Background ==
In the summer of 1890, a Swedish magazine, the Idun, had offered a prize for the best novel of a certain length. Lagerlöf entered the contest with a few chapters from Gösta Berling, a story which was then beginning to take shape in her mind, and won the prize. In Gösta Berling, Lagerlöf is a romanticist and represents a reaction against the realism which prevailed at the time. As a child, she had absorbed the folk tales of her surroundings, and later on in life it occurred to her like a lightning flash that it was her particular mission to give these stories expression. Gösta Berling's Saga has been called the "prose epic of Swedish country life".

The scene is laid on the shores of Lake Fryken (Lake Löven in the story) in Värmland. Using wolves, snow, supernatural elements and eccentric upper-class characters to project an exotic image of 1820s Värmland, the novel can be compared to magical realism. The title is meant to give associations to the Icelandic sagas. The first sentence, "Finally, the vicar was in the pulpit", is one of the most famous in Swedish literature.

== Plot ==
The hero, Gösta Berling, is a defrocked Lutheran priest whom the Mistress of Ekeby saves from freezing to death and then takes in as one of her prisoners at the manor at Ekeby. As the pensioners gain power, they manage the property as they see fit, and have their adventures lives. Gösta Berling is their leading spirit, the poet, the charming personality among a band of revelers. Before the story ends, Gösta Berling is redeemed, and even the old Mistress of Ekeby is permitted to come to her old home to die.

== English translations ==
The novel was first translated by Lillie Tudeer in 1894 as Gösta Berling's Saga, but was unavailable in the US and soon out of print in the UK. This edition was re-printed in 1918 by the American-Scandinavian Foundation with edits and 8 additional chapters that had been quietly omitted from the 1894 edition. It was also translated in 1898 by Pauline Bancroft Flach as The Story of Gösta Berling. Both of these editions are in the public domain and have been commonly reprinted by various publishers over the years.

A later English translation by poet Robert Bly was published (with a translator's afterword) in 1962. It was published by Signet Classics under the title The Story of Gösta Berling. The most recent English translation, by Paul Norlen, was published in 2009 by Penguin Books under the title The Saga of Gösta Berling.

== Main characters ==
- Gösta Berling, defrocked minister and chief character
- Margarita Samzelius (née Celsing), the Major's wife — in charge of Ekeby; she gives the cavaliers a place to stay
- Sintram, the Evil one who only causes mischief
- Marienne Sinclaire (Swedish Marianne Sinclaire), thrown out of her parents' house for kissing Gösta
- Countess Elizabeth (Karlsdotter), from Italy, married to Count Henrik Dohna
- Anna Stjärnhök, engaged to a minor character, at one time loves Gösta
- Countess Märta, mother of Henrik, step-mother of Ebba, rich and haughty
- Count Henrik Dohna, Elizabeth's husband, known for being 'stupid'
- Ebba Dohna, Marta's step-daughter, very pious — Gösta's first love
- The 12 Cavaliers: Gösta Berling, Colonel Beerencreutz, major Anders Fuchs, Little Ruster, Rutger von Örneclou, Kristian Bergh, Squire Julius, Kevenhüller, Cousin Kristoffer, Uncle Eberhard, Lövenborg, Lilliecrona

== Adaptations ==
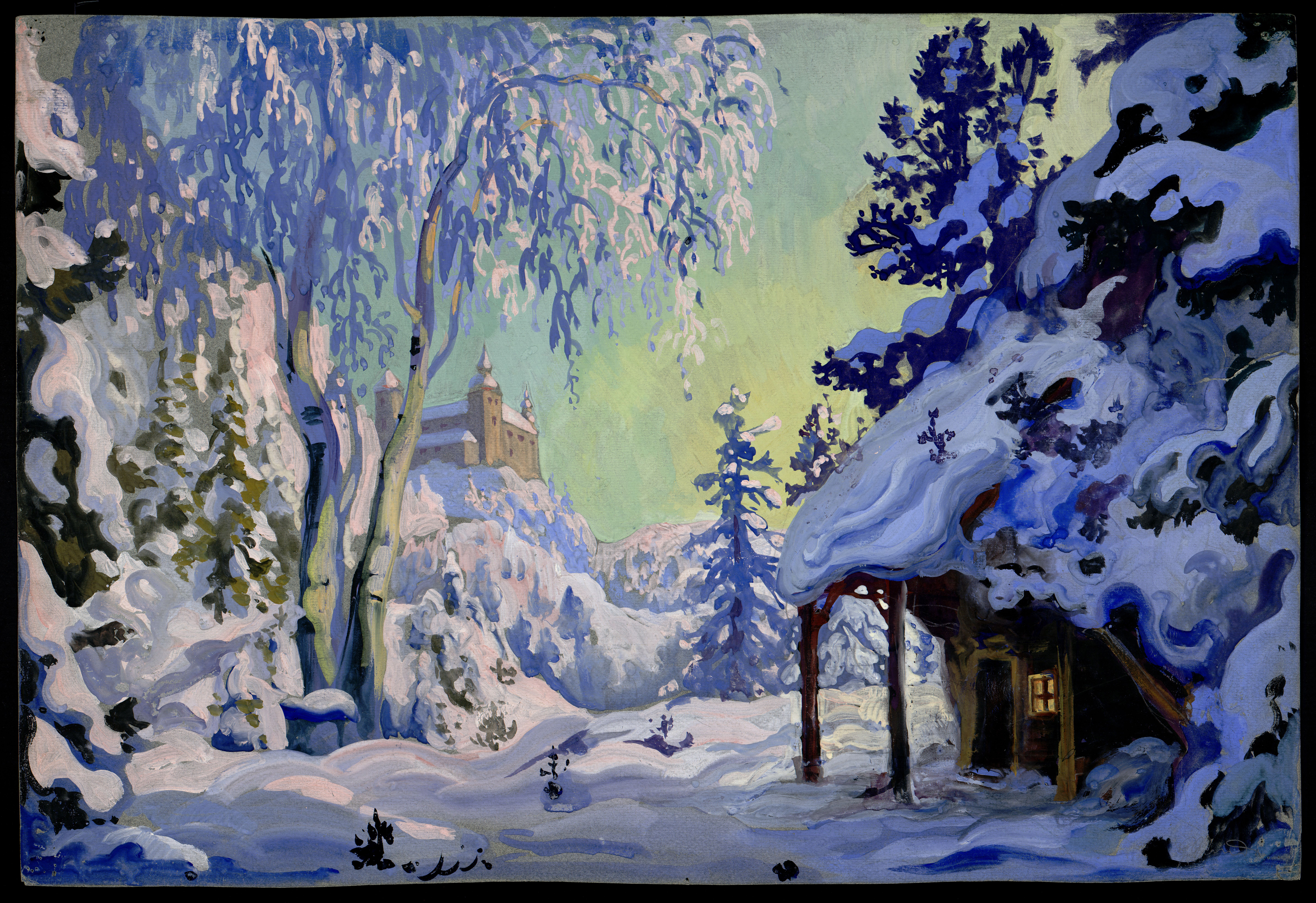
Set design for the opera I cavalieri di Ekebù

Film

- In 1924 the novel was made into a Swedish silent film (The Saga of Gosta Berling) starring the then mostly unknown Greta Garbo as Elizabeth and popular film actors Lars Hanson and Gerda Lundequist, directed by Mauritz Stiller.

Television

- Beginning on 10 March 1986, it was released as a 6-part, 347-minute mini-series for Swedish television.

Opera

- The opera by Riccardo Zandonai, I cavalieri di Ekebù (1925) is based on it.

Music

- In 2004 a progressive rock group from Sweden was formed under the name Gösta Berlings Saga. They have so far released seven studio albums.
