= Doctor Glas (1968 film) =

1968 drama film by Mai Zetterling

- Film poster
- Directed by: Mai Zetterling
- Screenplay by: David Hughes; Mai Zetterling
- Based on: Doctor Glas by Hjalmar Söderberg
- Produced by: Joseph Hardy; Benni Korzen; Mogens Skot-Hansen
- Starring: Per Oscarsson
- Cinematography: Rune Ericson
- Edited by: Wic Kjellin
- Music by: Bertrand Bech
- Production company: Laterna Film
- Release date: 12 June 1968
- Running time: 83 minutes
- Countries: Denmark; Sweden
- Languages: Danish; Swedish

Doctor Glas (Danish: Doktor Glas) is a 1968 Danish drama film directed by Mai Zetterling, based on the novel of the same name. According to Fox records the film required $500,000 in rentals to break even and by 11 December 1970 had made $125,000 so made a loss to the studio. It was listed to compete at the 1968 Cannes Film Festival, but the festival was cancelled due to the events of May 1968 in France. It is based on a 1905 novel Doctor Glas by Hjalmar Söderberg which had previously been made into a 1942 Swedish film of the same title.

== Cast ==
- Per Oscarsson as Dr. Glas
- Lone Hertz as Helga Gregorius
- Ulf Palme as Rev. Gregorius, Helga's husband
- Bente Dessau as Eva Martens
- Nils Eklund as Markel, journalist
- Lars Lunøe as Klas Recke, Helga's lover
- Berndt Rothe as Birck
- Helle Hertz as Anita
- Ingolf David as Dr. Glas' father
- Jonas Bergström as A university friend of Dr. Glas
