= Mikael Söderberg =

Swedish writer

Mikael Söderberg (8 December 1903 – 13 January 1931) was a Swedish writer.

== Personal life ==
Mikael Söderberg (b. 1903) was the youngest of the children of Swedish writer Hjalmar Söderberg (b. 1869, d. 1941) and Märta Abenius (b. 1871, d. 1932). He had two older full siblings, actress Dora Söderberg-Carlsten (b. 1899) and Tom Söderberg (b. 1900). He married Swedish-American journalist and writer Eugénie Riwkin Söderberg in 1928.

== Writing ==
Works include:

- Den främmande staden – berättelser, Åhlén & Åkerlund: [Bonnier], Stockholm 1928.
- Drömmar och dagdrömmar, Bonniers, Stockholm 1931.
- Samlade berättelser, Förord av Per-Olof Swartz, Söderbergsällskapet, Växjö 2009, Nummer 18 i Söderbergsällskapets skriftserie ISSN 1100-4304, ISBN 978-91-977970-1-6.

== Death ==
Söderberg decided to take his own life in 1931 using a pistol. He left a few hand-written notes:

- Suicide. No one are to blame in any way. Only I carry the responsibility for my misspent life.

His age at death was 27 years old.
