= The Serious Game =

Novel by Hjalmar Söderberg

- First English-language edition
- Author: Hjalmar Söderberg
- Original title: Den allvarsamma leken
- Translator: Eva Claeson
- Language: Swedish
- Publisher: Albert Bonniers förlag (Swedish); Marion Boyars (English)
- Publication date: 1912
- Publication place: Sweden
- English publication date: 2001
- Pages: 422

The Serious Game (Swedish: Den allvarsamma leken) is a 1912 novel by Hjalmar Söderberg. It tells the story of a man and a woman who fall in love when young, and remain in love, but stay separated and marry others.

Three Swedish films based on the book have been produced: Den allvarsamma leken (1945), Games of Love and Loneliness (1977) and A Serious Game (2016).

== Synopsis ==
Sweden at the turn of the previous century. Arvid, an ambitious and well-educated young man, meets Lydia, the daughter of a landscape painter, during an idyllic summer vacation and falls in love. Lydia, however, has other suitors, and Arvid is frightened of being tied down by his emotions. Trapped inside marriages of convenience, they struggle in later years to rekindle the promise of their romance with bitter and tragic results.

== Background ==
The novel was inspired by Maria von Platen, a woman that Söderberg had a love affair with some years earlier. He first used the subject in the play Gertrud in 1906. In 1908, he began writing a novel on the subject, but it was unfinished. Söderberg eventually picked up the subject again in 1912, and the novel was written in the summer and autumn of 1912 and published in November.

== Reception ==
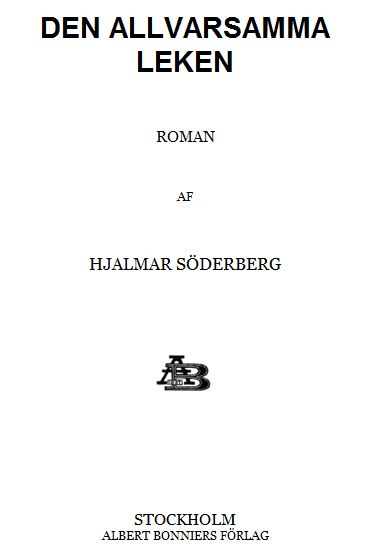
Title page of first Swedish edition

The novel received mixed reviews on its publication. Bo Bergman in Dagens Nyheter wrote: "It is an exquisite pleasure to read this clean and unadorned prose ... On the whole the best that is now written in Sweden", while critic Fredrik Böök in Svenska Dagbladet was very negative. The Serious Game is now acknowledged as a classic in Swedish literature and has been called "The only romance novel of any worth in Swedish literature". It has been published in more than thirty Swedish editions and translated to at least fourteen different languages.

The book was reviewed in Publishers Weekly in 2002: "Söderberg manifests a keen painterly eye for settings: Arvid and Lydia's affair plays out against a backdrop of serene Stockholm parks, crowded newspaper offices full of workaholic journalists and the spare bedrooms where their trysts take place—and in each locale, the details offered are just enough to create a world of sensations. Feminist readers may take umbrage at the male domination of Arvid's milieu—women get little or no air time, although they would seem to determine the course of the novel. Söderberg creates psychological suspense worthy of Dostoyevski, as Arvid's internal moral conflicts achieve the gravity of physical pain."

== Film adaptations ==
The 1945 version of Den allvarsamma leken starred Viveca Lindfors and Olof Widgren. The 2016 version was directed by Pernilla August and starred Karin Franz Körlof and Sverrir Gudnason

== In popular culture ==
In an HBO produced supernatural drama series True Blood (inspired by the books The Southern Vampire Mysteries aka The Sookie Stackhouse Novels), at the end of episode 10 (titled Radioactive) of the 6th season, one of the main characters — a thousand years old vampire — Eric Northman (played by a Swedish actor Alexander Skarsgård) is reading Den allvarsamma leken (in its original language), while sunbathing naked on top of a snowy mountain when a brief ability to "walk under sun" for the vampires suddenly vanishes.

== See also ==
- 1912 in literature
- Swedish literature
