= Erotikon =

Erotikon may refer to:

- Erotikon (1920 film), Swedish comedy silent film
- Erotikon (1929 film), Czech drama silent film
- Erotikon (1963 film), Slovene film by Boštjan Hladnik
- Erotikon, Lyric Pieces Op.43 No.5 for piano, by Grieg
