= D'Ailly =

D'Ailly is a surname. Notable people with the surname include:

- Adolf d'Ailly (1855–1927), Swedish malacologist after whom Aillyidae is named
- Arnold Jan d'Ailly, mayor of Amsterdam 1946–1956
- Pierre d'Ailly (1351–1420), French theologian, astrologer and cardinal of the Roman Catholic Church
- Sven d'Ailly (1892–1969, Swedish baritone, lute player, director and actor
- Michel-François d'Ailly (1724–1800), French politician and senator

== See also ==
- Ailly (disambiguation)
- Duke of Chaulnes
