= Doctor Glas =

Epistolary novel by Hjalmar Söderberg

- First US edition Cover art by Milton Glaser
- Author: Hjalmar Söderberg
- Original title: Doktor Glas
- Translator: Paul Britten Austin
- Language: Swedish
- Genre: Romance, Thriller
- Publisher: Little, Brown (US); Chatto & Windus (UK)
- Publication date: 1905
- Publication place: Sweden
- English publication date: 1963
- Pages: 150 pp
- ISBN: 0-385-72267-2 (recent edition)
- OCLC: 49925067
- Dewey Decimal: 839.73/72 21
- LC Class: PT9875.S6 D613 2002

Doctor Glas is a 1905 epistolary novel by Hjalmar Söderberg which tells the story of a physician in 19th-century Sweden who deal with issues of morality and love. The story is related in diary form.

== Synopsis ==
Dr. Tyko Gabriel Glas, a respected physician lives in Stockholm. Glas struggles with depression. The antagonist is Reverend Gregorius, a morally corrupt clergyman. Gregorius' beautiful young wife confides in Dr. Glas that her sex life is making her miserable and asks for his help. Glas falls in love with her and agrees to help even though she already has another lover. He attempts to intervene, but the Reverend refuses to give up his "marital rights": she must have sex with him whether she likes it or not. So, in order to make his love happy, he begins to plot her husband's murder.

The novel also deals with issues such as abortion, women's rights, suicide, euthanasia, and eugenics. The novel triggered a violent campaign against its author, who was vilified in Swedish literary circles.

== English translations ==
The first English edition of the novel was published in 1963, translated by Paul Britten Austin, with an introduction by author William Sansom. This translation was reprinted by Anchor Books in 2002 with an introduction by Canadian author Margaret Atwood. A new translation by Rochelle Wright was published by Counterpoint in 2015.

== Prequel ==
Swedish author Bengt Ohlsson 2004 prequel Gregorius using Söderberg's character Gregorius, expanding upon his background and explaining the origins of his corruption.

== Film adaptations ==
- 1942: a black-and-white Swedish adaptation directed by Rune Carlsten
- 1968: a Danish adaptation directed by Mai Zetterling
- 2026: a Swedish adaptation directed by Erik Leijonborg
