= Martin Birck's Youth =

1901 novella by Hjalmar Söderberg

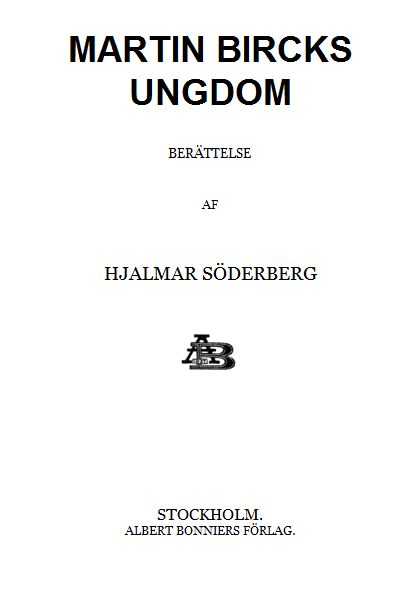
- Martin Birck's Youth
- Author: Hjalmar Söderberg
- Original title: Martin Bircks ungdom
- Language: Swedish
- Set in: Stockholm, Sweden
- Published: 1901
- Publication place: Sweden

Martin Birck's Youth (Swedish: Martin Bircks ungdom) is a 1901 novella by Swedish author Hjalmar Söderberg. It takes place in Stockholm.
