= Guje Lagerwall =

Swedish actress (1918–2019)

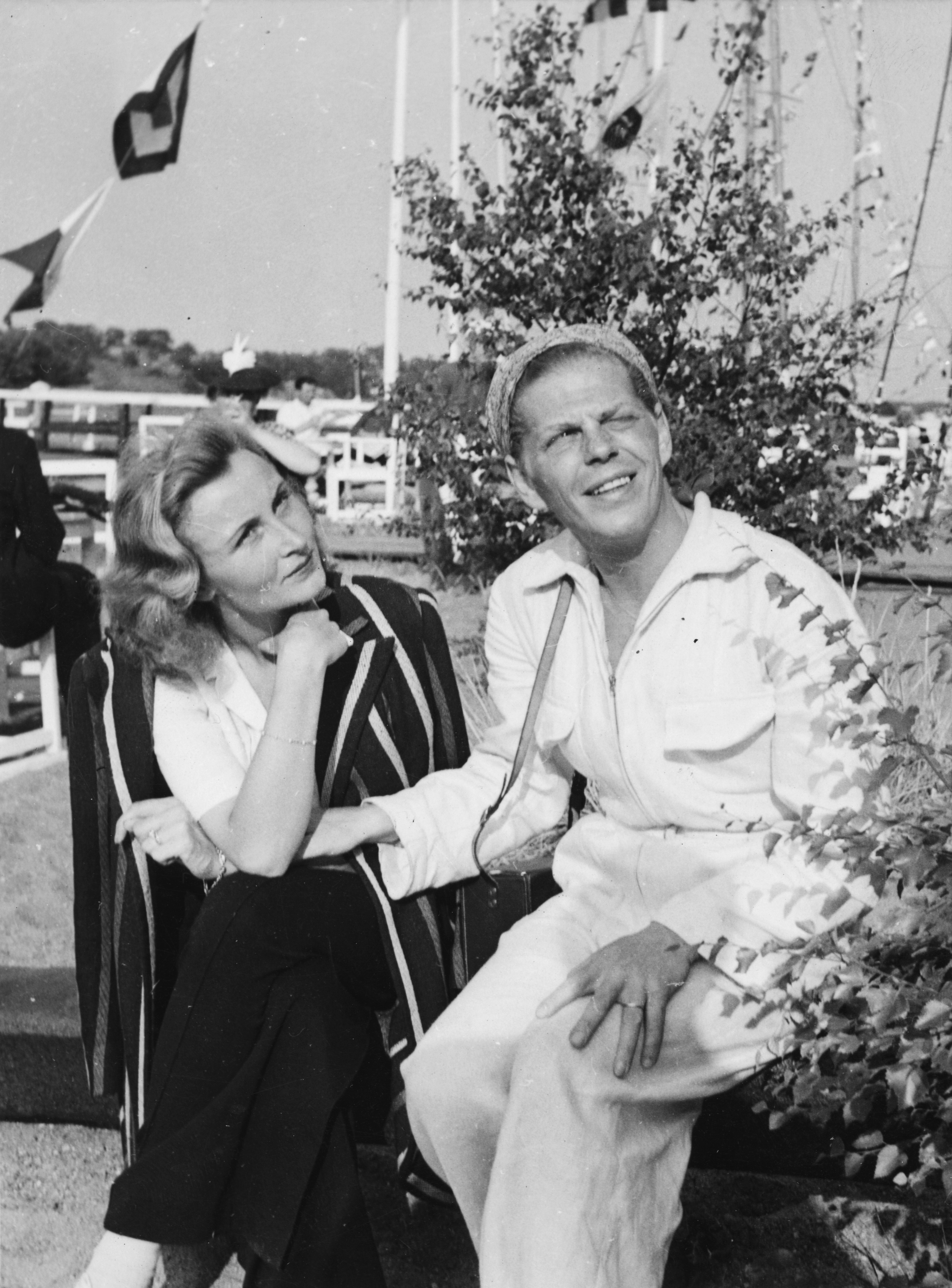
Guje and Sture Lagerwall in 1941

Guje Lagerwall (born Gun-Marie Sjöström; 13 January 1918 – 8 January 2019) was a Swedish actress.

== Life ==
Gun-Marie Sjöström was the daughter of film director and actor Victor Sjöström and actress Edith Erastoff-Sjöström. Lagerwall herself started an acting career and played supporting roles in a number of films. She sometimes worked under the name Guje Kanter. She was interviewed about her father in Kevin Brownlow's 1995 documentary Cinema Europe: The Other Hollywood.

She was married to actor Sture Lagerwall from 1940 until their divorce in 1956. Guje Lagerwall died on 8 January 2019, aged 100.

== Filmography ==
- Doktor Glas (1942)
- Maria of Kvarngarden (1945)
- Divorced (1951)
- Blondie, Beef and the Banana (1952)
- Han glömde henne aldrig (1952)
- International Criminal Police Commission
- Den underbara lögnen (1955)
- Farligt löfte (1955)
