= Doctor Glas (1942 film) =

1942 film

- Directed by: Rune Carlsten
- Written by: Lars Tessing; Torsten Lundqvist; Rune Carlsten
- Based on: Doctor Glas by Hjalmar Söderberg
- Produced by: Stellan Claësson
- Starring: Georg Rydeberg; Irma Christenson; Rune Carlsten
- Cinematography: Karl-Erik Alberts
- Edited by: Tage Holmberg
- Music by: Sven Rüno
- Production company: Svensk Talfilm
- Distributed by: AB Svensk Talfilm
- Release date: 30 November 1942
- Running time: 89 minutes
- Country: Sweden
- Language: Swedish

Doctor Glas (Swedish: Doktor Glas) is a 1942 Swedish drama film directed by Rune Carlsten and starring Georg Rydeberg, Irma Christenson and Hilda Borgström. It is based on the 1905 novel of the same name by Hjalmar Söderberg. The film's sets were designed by the art director Bertil Duroj. It was shot at the Centrumateljéerna Studios in Stockholm and on location around the city.

== Plot ==
Dr. Glas, an austere and well-respected physician, is in love with Helga Gregorius, one of his patients. When she confides in him that her husband’s sexual attentions disgust her but that, despite this, he will not leave her alone, the doctor begins to plot to rid her of him.

== Cast ==
- Georg Rydeberg as Dr. Glas
- Irma Christenson as Helga Gregorius
- Rune Carlsten as Rev. Gregorius
- Hilda Borgström as Kristin
- Gösta Cederlund as Markel
- Gabriel Alw as Martin Birck
- Sven Bergvall as Lowenius
- Gösta Grip as Klas Recke
- Guje Lagerwall as Eva Mertens
- Sven d'Ailly as Holm
- Artur Cederborgh as the head waiter
- Theodor Olsson as Helga's father
- Helge Mauritz as a policeman
- Eric Laurent as a policeman
- Egil Holmsen as the student
- Anna-Lisa Fröberg as the waitress
- Karin Lannby as Agnes Holm
- Lillebil Kjellén as Lowenius' daughter

== Reception ==
The reviews at the time of the film's release were positive. "The camera work, depicting enchanting views over the city of Stockholm was especially noted and praised."

Nordic National Cinemas calls it "one of the most successful productions [of the wartime]" and notes that Georg Rydeberg "splendidly portrays the itinerant loner Glas".
