= A/S Palladium =

Danish film production company

A/S Palladium was a Danish film production company which existed from 1919 to 2017.

== History ==
Palladium was founded in Sweden in 1919 but was after a few years acquired by Svend Nielsen and Lau Lauritzen. The company produced its last film in 1976 and was dissolved in 2017.

== Filmography ==
- Evas Forlovelse (1920)
- Landliggeridyl - Vandgang (1921)
- Tyvepak (1921)
- Opfinderen Ellehammer viser paa Lundtofte Flyveplads for førete Gang i Verden Flyvning paa Petroleum med nye Patroleumskarburator (1921)
- Harestegen (1921)
- Juleskibets Afrejse. Frederik VIII (1921)
- Københavns Havn og Frigavnen (1922)
- Sol, sommer og studiner (1922)
- Studentergaardens Indvielse 2. Februar 1922 (1922)
- Jubilæumsdyrskuet i Horsens 13-16. Juli 1922 (1922)
- Industrifilm (1923)
- World Cinema inviterer Publikum paa en flyvetur (1923)
- Kan Kærlighed kureres? (1923)
- Danske Folk i danske Klæder (1923)
- Med Palladiums Fotograf paa Udflugt til U.S.A. (1923)
- Vore venners vinter (1923)
- Livets karneval (1923)
- Lille Lise let-paa-taa (1923)
- Professor Petersens Plejebørn (1924)
- Kongens Isbaadssejlads (1924)
- Frederik VIII's Lystrejse til Middlelhavet (1924)
- Takt, tone og tosser (1925)
- Det daglige Brød (1925)
- Muldyr (1925)
- Øresundsugen (1925)
- Du skal ære din hustru (1925)
- Med 'Hans Egede' til Grønland (1925)
- Grønkøbings glade gavtyve (1925)
- Københavns Sherlock Holmes (1925)
- Udenfor Filmatelieret (1926)
- Dødsbokseren (1926)
- Ulvejægerne (1926)
- Børnehjælpsdagen i Odense (1926)
- Vore Damers Skønhedskonkurrence i Helsingør, 1.8.1926 (1926)
- Thorøfilmen (1926)
- Don Quixote (1926)
- Vester Vov-Vov (1927)
- Ping paa Palladium (1927)
- Tordenstenene (1927)
- Det belgiske Kongebesøg (1928)
- Børnehjælpsdagen i Odense (1928)
- Sommerfest i Ballerup (1928)
- Sommerfest i Køge (1928)
- Kongen af Pelikanien (1928)
- Pas paa pigerne (1930)
- Krudt med knald (1931)
- 7-9-13 (1934)
- Ud i den kolde sne (1934)
- Week-end (1935)
- Snushanerne (1936)
- Panserbasse (1936)
- Giftes - nej tak! (1936)
- Plat eller krone (1937)
- I de gode, gamle dage (1940)
- Sommerglæder (1940)
- Tag det som en mand (1941)
- Tante Cramers testamente (1941)
- Wienerbarnet (1941)
- Peter Andersen (1941)
- Tobiasnætter (1941)
- Regnen holdt op (1942)
- Et skud før midnat (1942)
- Ta' briller på (1942)
- Vi kunde ha' det saa rart (1942)
- Naar bønder elsker (1942)
- De tre skolekammerater (1944)
- Otte akkorder (1944)
- Fyrtøjet (1946)
- Vandet på landet (1946)
- Brevet fra afdøde (1946)
- De gamle (1947)
- Calle og Palle (1948)
- Den stjaalne minister (1949)
- Smedestræde 4 (1950)
- Vores fjerde far (1951)
- Sukceskomponisten (1954)
- Ordet (1955)
- Flugten til Danmark (1955)
- Tante Tut fra Paris (1956)
- Tre må man være (1959)
- Pigen i søgelyset (1959)
- Det tossede paradis (1962)
- Oskar (1962)
- Vi har det jo dejligt (1963)
- Selvmordsskolen (1964)
- Slottet (1964)
- Gertrud (1964)
- Sytten (1965)
- Soyas tagsten (1966)
- Sangen om den røde rubin (1970)
- Hvorfor gør de det? (1971)
- Tandlæge på sengekanten (1971)
- Rektor på sengekanten (1972)
- Motorvej på sengekanten (1972)
- Hopla på sengekanten (1976)
