= Historietter =

Collection of short stories by Hjalmar Söderberg

First edition (publ. Bonniers)

Historietter is a collection of 20 short stories, written by Hjalmar Söderberg. The stories are known for Söderberg's use of symbolism.

== Stories ==
The melancholy and sometimes humorous stories in "Historietter" is typically about people in everyday situations but is often charged with ambiguous undertones. A well known story is "Pälsen".

The term Historietter ("Storyettes") was Söderberg's own invention for his short stories first published in literary magazines and newspapers in the late 1890s and collected in this book in 1898. With its innovative and distinctly personal style Historietter is regarded as a classic book in Swedish literature.
