= The Divine Woman =

1928 film

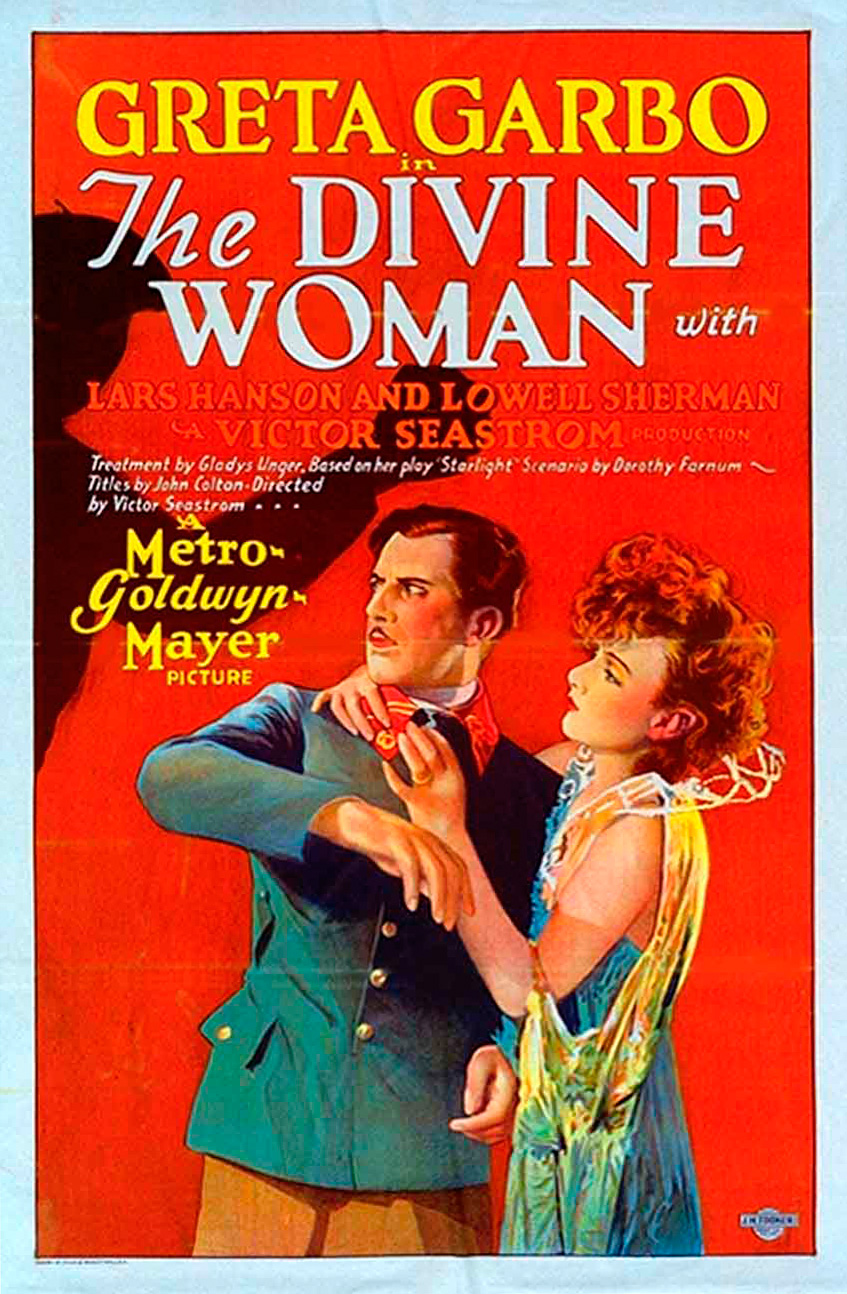
- Directed by: Victor Sjöström
- Written by: John Colton (titles); Dorothy Farnum (writer)
- Based on: Starlight by Gladys Unger
- Produced by: Richard A. Rowland
- Starring: Greta Garbo; Lars Hanson
- Cinematography: Oliver T. Marsh
- Edited by: Conrad A. Nervig
- Distributed by: Metro-Goldwyn-Mayer
- Release date: January 14, 1928
- Running time: 80 minutes
- Country: United States
- Languages: Silent film English intertitles
- Budget: $266,817.14
- Box office: $931,000 (worldwide rental)

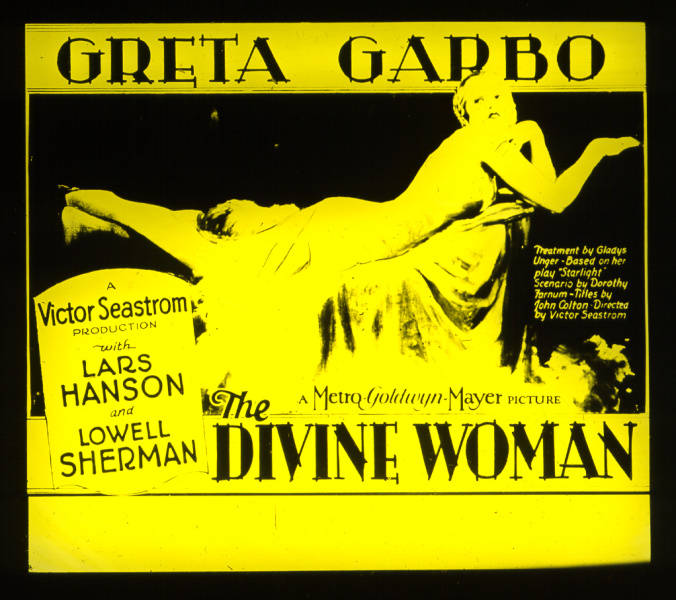
Lantern slide for the film

The Divine Woman is a 1928 American silent romantic drama film directed by Victor Sjöström and starring Greta Garbo. Produced and distributed by Metro-Goldwyn-Mayer. Only a single nine-minute reel and an additional 45-second excerpt are currently known to exist of this otherwise lost film; the only known complete copy of which was destroyed in the 1965 MGM vault fire.

The film grossed $541,000 in the USA and $390,000 internationally; its worldwide gross was $931,000 and generated MGM a profit of $354,000.

The film won the March 1928 Photoplay Award for the Best Pictures of the Month, as well as Best Performances of the Month for both Greta Garbo and Lars Hanson.

== Origin ==
The film is adapted from the 1925 Broadway play Starlight by Gladys Unger, which starred Doris Keane. The plot is loosely based on stories of the early life of the French actress Sarah Bernhardt.

== Plot ==
Marianne is a poor French country girl who goes to Paris in the 1860s to seek her fortune as an actress. As she rises to success in the theatre, she must choose between the romantic attentions of two men. The first is Lucien, a poor but passionate young soldier who deserts the army to be with Marianne and goes to jail after stealing a dress to give her. Her other suitor is Henry Legrand, a wealthy middle-aged Paris producer who offers her fame and fortune.

== Cast ==
- Greta Garbo as Marianne
- Lars Hanson as Lucien
- Lowell Sherman as Henry Legrand
- Polly Moran as Mme. Pigonier
- Dorothy Cumming as Mme. Zizi Rouck, Marianne's Mother
- Johnny Mack Brown as Jean Lery
- Cesare Gravina as Gigi
- Paulette Duval as Paulette
- Jean De Briac as Stage Director

== Existing reel ==
Only one reel from the film is known to exist. It runs nine minutes and was discovered in 1993 at the Gosfilmofond, a film archive in Moscow. This film fragment has been released on DVD with a collection of Garbo films and has been broadcast on Turner Classic Movies. Its Russian intertitles have been translated into English. In this section of the film, Marianne is seen living in Paris in modest rooms. After a playful interchange with the landlady Mme. Pigionier, Marianne is joined by Lucien. The two lovers share a few poignant minutes together as the time approaches for him to return to the army.

== See also ==
- List of incomplete or partially lost films
