= Lars Hanson =

Swedish film and stage actor (1886–1965)

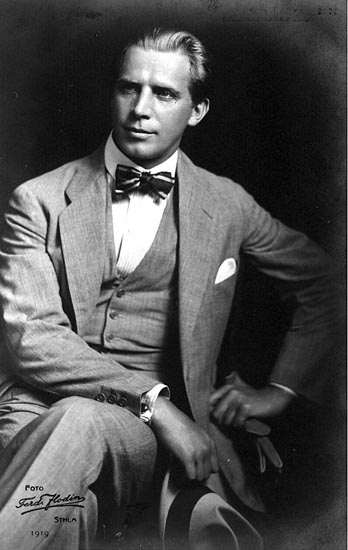
- Born: 26 July 1886; Gothenburg, Sweden
- Died: 8 April 1965 (aged 78); Stockholm, Sweden
- Occupation: Actor
- Years active: 1915–1951
- Spouse: Karin Molander (m. 1922)

Lars Mauritz Hanson (26 July 1886 – 8 April 1965) was a Swedish film and stage actor, internationally mostly remembered for his motion picture roles during the silent film era.

== Biography ==
Born in Göteborg, Sweden, Hanson began his career on the stages of Sweden after studying drama in Helsinki and Stockholm as a Shakespearean actor, appearing in such classics as Othello and Hamlet. Hanson made his film debut in the 1915 film Dolken, directed by Mauritz Stiller, and his popularity as a leading man in his homeland grew with ensuing roles. He was a student of the Royal Dramatic Training Academy.

While already a well-established popular actor in Sweden and much of continental Europe, Hanson gained greater international recognition for his role as the title character in the 1923 Stiller film Gösta Berlings saga (English: The Story of Gösta Berling), which featured a young Mauritz Stiller protégée named Greta Garbo in one of her first major appearances on screen as well as film stage actress Gerda Lundequist. At the request of American actress Lillian Gish, Hanson arrived in Hollywood, California in 1926 (the same year as Garbo) to star opposite Gish in the film version of The Scarlet Letter directed by fellow countryman Victor Sjöström.

In 1922, Hanson married the ex-wife of influential director Gustaf Molander, Swedish actress Karin Molander. The couple remained married until Hanson's death in 1965.

Hanson's Hollywood career as an actor steadily grew momentum during the 1920s and he was paired with Garbo in two more motion pictures: MGM's 1927 box-office hit Flesh and the Devil, which also starred Garbo's offscreen lover, the successful film actor John Gilbert, and 1928's The Divine Woman, again directed by Sjöström. Sjöström also directed Hanson in a performance opposite Gish in The Wind (1928). By the end of the 1920s, however, the era of the silent film was waning, and seeing that his heavy Swedish accent might be a liability in American films, Hanson returned to Europe.

Upon arriving back in Europe in 1928, Hanson starred in the aptly titled German film Heimkehr (English: Homecoming) opposite Gustav Fröhlich and Dita Parlo. The following year, he starred in a British version of The Informer filmed at Elstree Studios, playing the same role for which Victor McLaglen won an Academy Award for Best Actor in the John Ford-directed version six years later.

Hanson continued to appear in Swedish films until the early 1950s before retiring. Hanson's last performance was in the 1951 film Dårskapens hus (The Nuthouse).

In Sweden, Hanson balanced his film work with an outstanding stage career, making memorable appearances in A Dream Play (1935), The Ghost Sonata (1942), and as James Tyrone in the world premiere of Eugene O'Neill's Long Day's Journey into Night (1956). In 1956, Hanson and actress Inga Tidblad (who played Mary Tyrone) also became the first two actors to receive The Eugene O'Neill Award, today known as Sweden's most prestigious theatre award and presented annually to the country's most outstanding stage actors. Hanson was also a successful Shakespearean actor, especially for his performances as Richard III and Hamlet.

Hanson died in Stockholm, Sweden in 1965 after a short illness at age 78.

== Selected filmography ==
- The Wings (1916)
- The Lass from the Stormy Croft (1917)
- A Dangerous Wooing (1919)
- Synnöve Solbakken (1919)
- Erotikon (1920)
- The Saga of Gosta Berling (1924)
- Ingmar's Inheritance (1925)
- To the Orient (1926)
- The Scarlet Letter (1926)
- Flesh and the Devil (1927)
- Captain Salvation (1927)
- The Divine Woman (1928)
- Sin (1928)
- The Wind (1928)
- Heimkehr (1928)
- The Call of the North (1929)
- The Informer (1929)
- Walpurgis Night (1935)
- Conflict (1937)
- Första divisionen (1941)
- Ride Tonight! (1942)
- There's a Fire Burning (1943)
- His Excellency (1944)
