= Ailly =

Ailly may refer to the following places in France:

- Ailly, Eure, Normandy
- Ailly-le-Haut-Clocher, Somme, Hauts-de-France
- Ailly-sur-Noye, Somme, Hauts-de-France
- Ailly-sur-Somme, Somme, Hauts-de-France

== See also ==
- d'Ailly, a surname
- Aillyidae, a family of snails
