= Ebbe Rode =

Danish actor (1910–1998)

- Born: 10 May 1910; Frederiksberg, Denmark
- Died: 23 May 1998 (aged 88); Copenhagen, Denmark
- Occupation: Actor
- Spouses: Bodil Kjer (1939–1945 or 1948); Helle Virkner (1949–1958); Nina Pens Rode (1959–1981)

Ebbe Rode (10 May 1910 – 23 May 1998) was a Danish stage and film actor. His father was the writer and critic Helge Rode and his mother the writer Edith Rode. Ebbe Rode was married three times, to actresses Bodil Kjer, Helle Virkner and Nina Pens Rode.

== Partial filmography ==
- Tango (1933) - Jazzdirigent Jossy Lindtner
- Provinsen kalder (1935) - Hans
- Millionærdrengen (1936) - Ralph
- Den kloge mand (1937) - Ulf Yhomsen
- Balletten danser (1938) - Jørgen Frandsen
- Afsporet (1942) - Janus Jensen
- Søren Søndervold (1942) - Søren Søndervold
- Frøken Vildkat (1942) - Peter Bruun
- Lykken kommer (1942) - Ole Hagen
- Som du vil ha' mig (1943) - Dr. Frederik Holm
- Spurve under taget (1944) - Carl
- Frihed, lighed og Louise (1944) - Walther Henningsen
- Familien Gelinde (1944) - Harry Gelinde
- Otte akkorder (1944) - Manfred Thomsen
- To som elsker hinanden (1944) - Torben Holm
- Den usynlige hær (1945) - Jørgen
- Jeg elsker en anden (1946) - John Eriksen
- Ditte Menneskebarn (1946) - Johannes - Lars Peters bror
- The Swedenhielm Family (1947) - Rolf Swedenhielm jr.
- Ta', hvad du vil ha' (1947) - Kurt Bergholtz
- Kristinus Bergman (1948) - Kristinus Bergman
- Mikkel (1949) - Speaker (voice)
- John og Irene (1949) - John
- For frihed og ret (1949) - Rasmus Nielsen
- Din fortid er glemt (1950) - Robert
- Nålen (1951) - Direktør
- Fireogtyve timer (1951) - Dommer Paul Berger
- Det kunne vært deg (1952) - Cornelius
- Vi som går stjernevejen (1956) - Magister Winther
- Jeg elsker dig (1957) - August
- Harry og kammertjeneren (1961) - Fabricius
- Det stod i avisen (1962) - Poul
- Gertrud (1964) - Gabriel Lidman
- Naboerne (1966) - Tandlæge Gormsen
- Utro (1966) - Torben
- Tre mand frem for en trold (1967) - Professor
- Oktoberdage (1970) - Leo Stein
- Hærværk (1977) - Redaktør Iversen
- Rend mig i traditionerne (1979) - Lektor Jacobsen
- De uanstændige (1983) - Conrad / Mick and Topsy's father
- Sidste akt (1987) - Mr. Osborne
- Babettes gæstebud (1987) - Christopher
- Høfeber (1991) - Landsretspræsident
