= Nina Pens Rode =

Danish actress (1929–1992)

- Born: Nina Pens; 22 May 1929; Kongens Lyngby, Denmark
- Died: 22 July 1992 (aged 63); Frederiksberg, Denmark
- Occupation: Actress
- Spouses: Mogens Lind (1952–59); Ebbe Rode (1959–1981)

Nina Pens Rode (22 May 1929 – 22 July 1992) was a Danish stage and film actress. She is best known for her performance in the title role in Carl Theodor Dreyer's 1964 film Gertrud.

Born Nina Pens as the daughter of Svend Thorkild Pens and Rigmor Restorff, she received her actor's education at the Odense Teater. Appearing both in film and on television, her first notable role was in Erik Balling's 1956 Kispus. After divorcing her first husband Mogens Lind, she married actor Ebbe Rode in 1959, with whom she had a son, actor Martin Rode. Together with her husband, she performed in Carl Theodor Dreyer's last film, the 1964 Gertrud, in a role which had originally been intended for Bodil Kjer.

== Filmography (selected) ==
- 1951: Dorte
- 1952: Husmandstøsen
- 1952: Kærlighedsdoktoren
- 1954: Arvingen
- 1956: Kispus
- 1964: Gertrud
