= The Saga of Gösta Berling =

1924 film by Mauritz Stiller

- Theatrical release poster
- Directed by: Mauritz Stiller
- Screenplay by: Mauritz Stiller; Ragnar Hyltén-Cavallius
- Based on: Gösta Berling's Saga; 1891 novel by Selma Lagerlöf
- Starring: Lars Hanson; Greta Garbo
- Cinematography: Julius Jaenzon
- Production company: AB Svensk Filmindustri
- Distributed by: AB Svenska Biografteaterns Filmbyrå
- Release date: 10 March 1924
- Running time: 86 minutes (Part I); 80 minutes (Part II); 183 minutes
- Country: Sweden
- Languages: Silent film Swedish intertitles

The Saga of Gösta Berling (Swedish: Gösta Berlings saga) is a 1924 Swedish romantic drama film co-written and directed by Mauritz Stiller and released by Svensk Filmindustri, starring Lars Hanson, Gerda Lundequist and Greta Garbo in her domestic film breakthrough, her first leading role. It is based on Swedish Nobel Prize-winning author Selma Lagerlöf's 1891 debut novel Gösta Berling's Saga. The film is also known as Gösta Berling's Saga, The Story of Gösta Berling and The Atonement of Gösta Berling.

== Plot ==
The Saga of Gösta Berling (1924)

In Värmland, the (fictional) estate of "Ekeby" is home to a company of twelve "Cavaliers", former soldiers who often spend their time as drunk guests of Margaretha Samzelius, wife of a former army major. On Christmas Eve, Gösta Berling, a defrocked Lutheran minister, leads evening revels and tricks the company with an appearance of a "devil", played by household servant Sintram.

Berling used to be a minister on the verge of being removed from his parish by the presiding bishop because of his habitual drunkenness. Berling gave a moving sermon, though, that made the parishioners and bishop ready to forgive him until he began to denounce their hypocrisy. Driven into exile, he becomes tutor to Ebba Dohna, stepdaughter of the mistress of Borg, an estate near Ekeby. The mother hopes to have Ebba marry Berling so that she will be disinherited for marrying a commoner, allowing the mother's natural son, Hendrik, to become heir to the estate.

At that time, Hendrik returns from a trip to Italy with his new wife, Elizabeth. At dinner, Berling's past is exposed, devastating Ebba, who is in love with him, but rousing the sympathy of Elizabeth. Berling leaves Borg and is found half-frozen by Margaretha who brings him to Ekeby and makes him one of the Cavaliers. Berling eventually learns of Ebba's death, apparently from grief, and Margaretha reveals how she had left home under the curse of her mother because of her own love for a man.

At a dinner party, Berling is one of several performers in pantomimes and skits. In a scene with young neighbor woman Marianne Sinclaire, she kisses him, although the audience thinks it is part of the act. Marianne's father, however, is outraged and leaves the party, with Marianne walking in the snow to their house, where her father refuses to let her in. At the party, Margarethe's own past is exposed by a Cavalier, and her husband the Major throws her out of the house. Disgusted with life, the Major gives control of Ekeby to the Cavaliers, predicting that they will ruin the estate.

Berling searches for Margaretha but finds Marianne collapsed in the snow by her family's front door. Berling takes her back to Ekeby but tries to keep her presence confidential since she has fallen ill. Margarethe returns to the cottage where her mother still lives, seeking forgiveness. As the old woman collapses and lies dying, there is a partial reconciliation but Margarethe realizes that she must atone for her past by driving the Cavaliers out of Ekeby.

At Borg, Hendrik learns that his Italian marriage to Elizabeth will not be considered legal until they both sign certain documents. At Ekeby, Berling considers marriage to Marianne, who turns him away after revealing that her face was scarred by smallpox. Margarethe, driven by her own guilt and rage, assembles a party to set fire to the wing of Ekeby housing the Cavaliers to exile them. The fire gets out of control, however, and begins to burn the central mansion housing Marianne, whom Berling saves from the flames just as her father arrives, now relieved that she is safe.

At Borg, seeing the fire, Elizabeth heads across the lake to Ekeby on foot, and is discovered by Berling, who was driving a sleigh across the ice. At first, in a fit of passion, Berling proposes eloping and taking Elizabeth away from Värmland and beyond. But he turns the sleigh back when he realizes that they are being pursued on the frozen lake by wolves, which they eventually outrun.

Back at Borg, Hendrik offers Elizabeth the new documents to sign and legalize their marriage, but she has to confess that she has not given her heart to him, leading to the ultimate dashing of Hendrik's mother's hopes. Elizabeth goes to live with the Sinclaires, where she and Marianne become friends. On a visit to Margarethe in her mother's cottage, Elizabeth confesses her love for Berling, who had just entered the room without her noticing. Inspired by Marianne, Berling oversees the reconstruction of Ekeby. Margarathe returns to the newly built estate, which she now offers as a home to Berling and Elizabeth. The events are celebrated by the now-reformed Cavaliers.

== Cast ==
- Lars Hanson as Gösta Berling
- Greta Garbo as Elizabeth Dohna
- Sven Scholander as Sintram
- Gerda Lundequist as Margaretha Samzelius
- Ellen Hartman-Cederström as Märtha Dohna
- Mona Mårtenson as Ebba Dohna
- Torsten Hammarén as Henrik Dohna
- Jenny Hasselqvist as Marianne Sinclaire
- Sixten Malmerfelt as Melchior Sinclaire
- Karin Swanström as Gustafva Sinclaire
- Oscar Byström as Patron Julius
- Hugo Rönnblad as Beerencreutz
- Knut Lambert as Örneclou
- Svend Kornbeck as Christian Bergh
- Otto Elg-Lundberg as Samzelius

== Release ==
=== Restorations ===
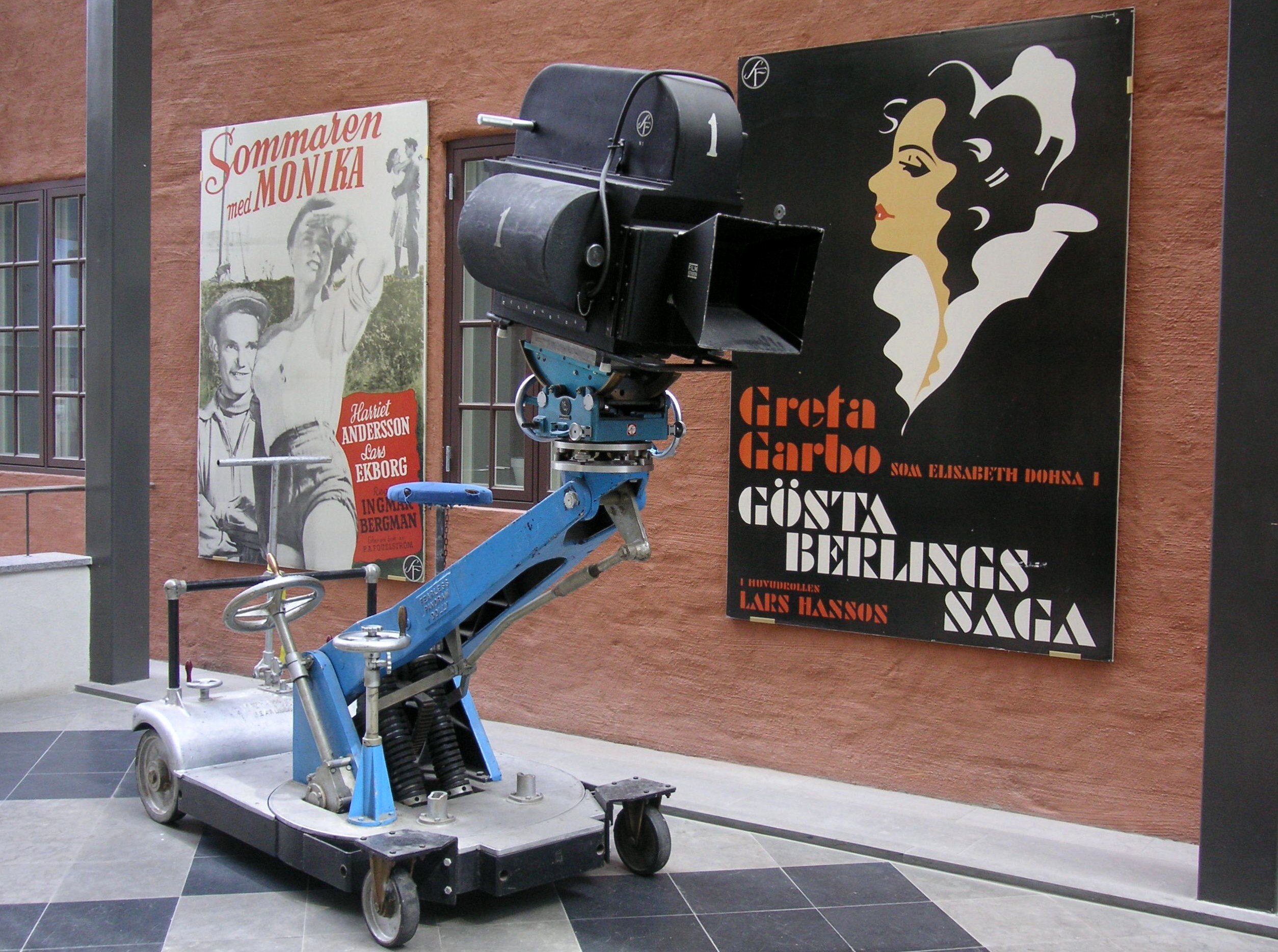
Camera and poster in Filmstaden, Solna.

Due to its length, the film was originally released in two parts in Sweden, Gösta Berlings saga del I on 10 March 1924, and Gösta Berlings saga del II seven days later. The two-part version was also released in Finland and Norway, but for the rest of the world a shorter, one-part export version was made.

In 1927 the film was recut, almost halving its running time. This was the only version that was archived. In 1933 a sound version was released theatrically in Stockholm, with the intertitles removed, along with additional edits and some reordering of the scenes. Most of the missing material was discovered 20 years later and a restored version with new intertitles was released in theatres. The Swedish Film Institute added newly found fragments throughout the years, but as of the 1975 restoration about 450 metres of film from the original cut remained missing.

A new, comprehensive restoration of the film was made in 2018. This version is 16 minutes longer than the previous restoration and brings the film close to its original running time. It also restores the film's tinting scheme for the first time since its original release.

=== Home media ===
In 2008, a Swedish DVD was released by AB Svensk Filmindustri, with English, French, Portuguese, Spanish and German subtitles. The 192-minute restoration played at 184 minutes, due to PAL's 4% speed-up. It featured a specially commissioned 2005 score by pianist and silent film music composer Matti Bye. The same version was also released on US DVD in 2006, by Kino International. It also played at 184 minutes as the NTSC DVD used the unconverted PAL transfer.
