= Raghda Khateb =

Syrian actress and voice actress (born 1978)

- رغدة الخطيب
- Born: January 2, 1978 (age 48); Suwayda, Syria
- Occupations: Voice actress, actress
- Years active: 2003–present

Raghda Khateb (Arabic: رغدة الخطيب, born January 2, 1978) is a Syrian actress and voice actress.

== Filmography ==
=== Cartoon ===
- Adventures from the Book of Virtues
- Ben 10 - Charmcaster
- Charley and Mimmo - Amjad (T'choupi) (Venus Centre version)
- Futurama - Amy Wong
- Krypto the Superdog - Kevin Whitney, Brainy Barker, Isis
- Little Clowns of Happytown
- ¡Mucha Lucha! - Buena Girl (Venus Centre version)
- Stickin' Around - Stacy Stickler
- The Wacky World of Tex Avery - Maurice
