= Sven d'Ailly =

Swedish actor and opera singer

- Born: Sven Adolf Hack d'Ailly; January 1, 1892; Stockholm
- Died: August 14, 1969 (aged 77); Täby
- Occupations: opera singer, lute player, director, actor

Sven Adolf Hack d'Ailly (January 1, 1892 in Stockholm – August 14, 1969 in Täby), was a Swedish baritone, lute player, director, actor, and grandmaster of Par Bricole.

== Filmography ==
- 1919: Sons of Ingmar
- 1942: Doctor Glas
- 1944: My People Are Not Yours
- 1947: The Girl from the Marsh Croft
- 1961: Rififi in Stockholm

== Discography ==
- Luciavalsen / Vår Vintervals
- Set Svanholm Live
- The Jussi Bjorling Series (1934-1951)
- Operan (Röster Från Stockholmsoperan Under 100 År)
