= Gerda Lundequist =

Swedish actress (1871–1959)

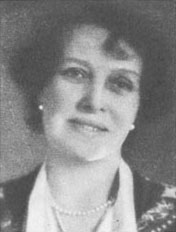
- Lundequist, 1920s
- Born: Gerda Carola Cecilia Lundequist; 14 February 1871; Stockholm, Sweden
- Died: 23 October 1959 (aged 88); Stockholm, Sweden
- Occupation: Actress
- Years active: 1889–1955
- Spouse: Alfred Dahlström

Gerda Carola Cecilia Lundequist (Swedish pronunciation: [ˈjæ̂ːɖa ˈlɵ̂nːdɛˌkvɪst]; 14 February 1871 – 23 October 1959) was a Swedish stage actress, an Ibsen and Strindberg-thespian that in her time was known throughout Scandinavia as "The Swedish Sarah Bernhardt".

== Career ==
Lundequist was considered one of Scandinavia's leading tragediennes and dramatic stage actresses, and she originated many leading female parts in plays by Ibsen and Strindberg. She had a 60-year-long career as a professional actress (with debut 1889) before she made her last performance in 1949 as Julia Hylténius in the successful staging of the comedy The Barons Will by Hjalmar Bergman. She studied at the Royal Dramatic Training Academy 1886-1889 and in 1891 appeared as Queen Gertrude in Hamlet, a performance that established Lundequist's reputation. In 1890, she originated the role of Anne-Marie in Ibsen's A Doll's House and in 1897 the role of Ella Rentheim in Ibsen's John Gabriel Borkman.

Other performances by Lundequist include the title role in Schiller's Maria Stuart (1910), Goneril in Shakespeare's King Lear (1908), Béline in Molière's The Imaginary Invalid (1897), the title role in Maeterlinck's Monna Vanna (at the Swedish Theatre 1912), the title role in Hjalmar Söderberg's Gertrud (1907; original staging), Tora in Paul Lange and Tora Parsberg by Bjørnson (1922), Mrs Alving in Ibsen's Ghosts (1938) and Mrs. Dowey in The Old Lady Shows Her Medals by J.M. Barrie (1940). In 1923, she also staged and directed Eugene O'Neill's play Anna Christie at Helsingborg City Theatre, as one of Sweden's first female stage directors.

Lundequist was an outspoken feminist and fighter for women's emancipation in her field, and was a regular lecturer as well as an elected member of the school council at Fogelstad School for Women (a school run by the influential Fogelstad-group that included feminist writer Elin Wägner).

In 1947, at age 76, she had critical success with portrayal as the Dutchess of York in Richard III, directed by Alf Sjöberg and as Maria Josefa in Lorca's Blood Wedding.

Lundequist appeared in relatively few films; one of her more notable performances was as the Major's wife, Mrs. Margareta Samzelius, in the silent film The Saga of Gösta Berling (1924). Lundequist played a supporting role in the 1955 Swedish drama film Giftas (based on a novel by August Strindberg), as the old Royal Highness, at age 84.

== Filmography ==
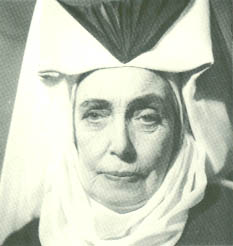
As the Dutchess of York in Shakespeare's Richard III, The Royal Dramatic Theatre, 1947

Year	Title	Role	Notes
1924	Gösta Berlings saga	Majorskan; Margaretha Samzelius	aka The Saga of Gösta Berling
1931	One Night	Beckius	
1940	With Open Arms	Karolina Koger	
1944	Count Only the Happy Moments	Mrs. Branzell	
1946	Onsdagsväninnan	Mathilde Hallencreutz	
1947	Den Långa vägen	Grandma	
1955	Getting Married	Her Royal Highness	aka Of Love and Lust
1961	Maria Angelica	The old one, Dubois' mother	TV-theatre aired posthumously on Swedish television, (final film role)

== Stage work ==
A great deal of Gerda Lundequist's stage work are listed here.

== Family ==
Spouse - Alfred Dahlström (1908 - 1923) (his death)
Daughter - Cecilia Matilda Frida Dahlström (1918 - 2001)
Grand children - Martin Shaw, Robin Shaw and Sonja Kristina (celebrated British singer and actress)
