= Dora Söderberg =

Swedish actress (1899–1990)

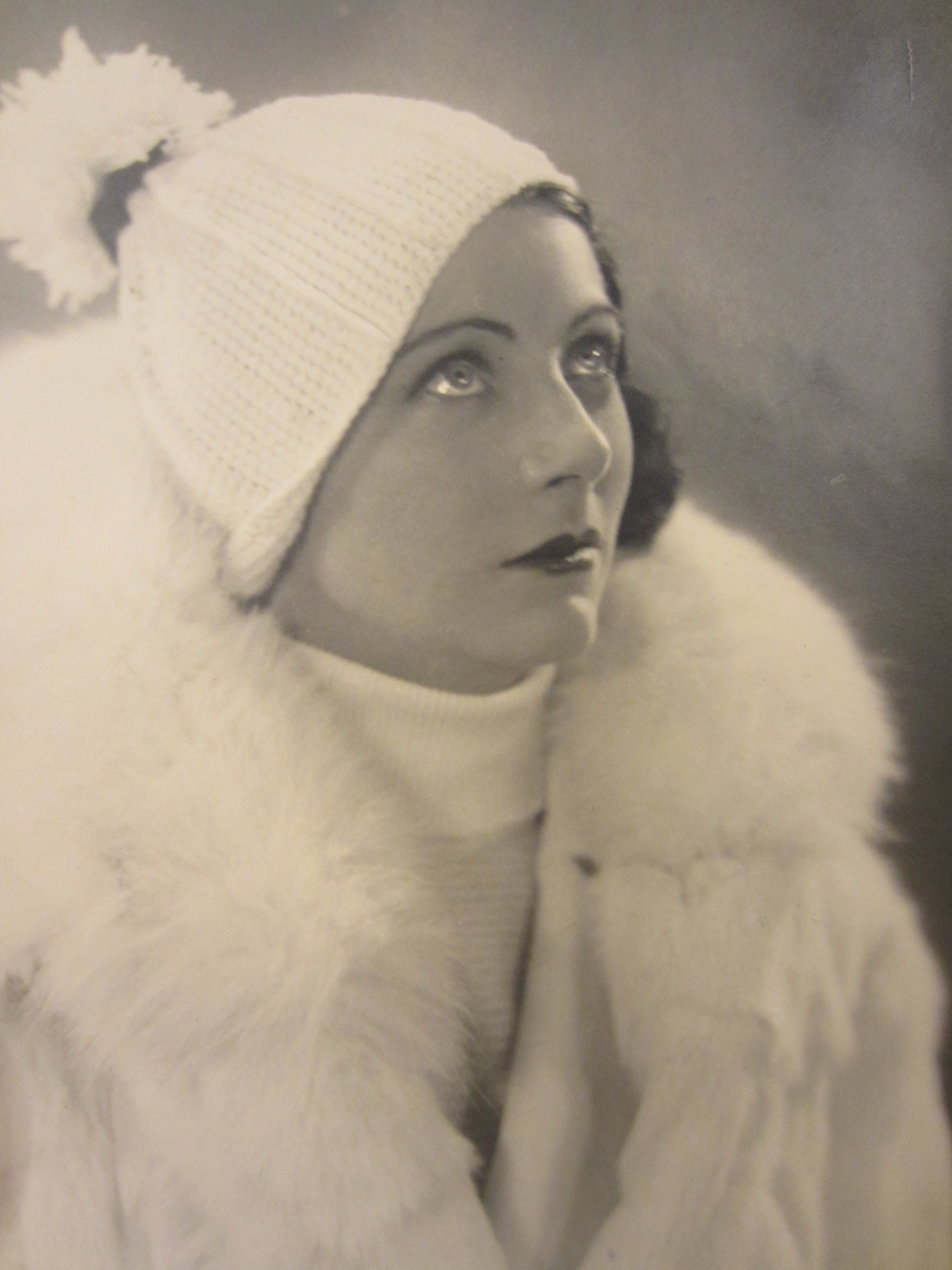
Dora Söderberg-Carlsten

Dora Söderberg (10 November 1899 – 9 November 1990) was a Swedish stage, film, and television actress.

Daughter of the famous Swedish novelist and playwright Hjalmar Söderberg.

Dora Söderberg was a highly acclaimed character actress and a longtime member of Sweden's national stage, the Royal Dramatic Theatre-ensemble (1935–1986), where she acted in more than 80 productions. She trained at the Royal Dramatic Training Academy from 1917 to 1919.

Dora Söderberg was married to Swedish theatre- and film director Rune Carlsten.

Sometimes credited as Dora Carlsten or Dora Söderberg-Carlsten.

== Source and references ==
- Actors encyclopedia "Svenska konstnärer inom scen, musik och film"; Dora Söderberg; Bonniers; (1943) (Sweden)
- Om igen, herr Molander! by Ingrid Luterkort, Stockholmia Förlag, Borås, Sweden, 1998 (list; students at the Royal Dramatic Training Academy)
- Dora Söderberg - Rollboken - at Dramaten.se (list of stage credits at The Royal Dramatic Theatre).
