= Karin Molander =

Swedish actress

- Molander in 1917
- Born: Katarina Margareta Elisabet Edwertz; 20 May 1889; Stockholm, Sweden
- Died: 3 September 1978 (aged 89); Täby, Sweden
- Occupation: Actress
- Years active: 1907–1954
- Spouses: Gustaf Molander (m. 1910; div. 1918) Lars Hanson (m. 1922; died 1965)

Karin Molander (born Katarina Margareta Elisabet Edwertz; 20 May 1889 – 3 September 1978) was a Swedish stage and film actress whose career spanned over five decades.

== Career ==
In Stockholm, Sweden, Molander began taking classes from theater actress Julia Håkansson at a young age. She debuted on stage at the Vasa Theatre in 1907. Moreover, she was engaged at the Intiman Theatre from 1911 to 1920, the Lorensberg Theatre from 1920 to 1922, and the Royal Dramatic Theatre in two phases: 1922 to 1925 and again from 1931 to 1936. Molander made her film debut in 1913 in director Victor Sjöström's Halvblod. Working with filmmaker Mauritz Stiller, Molander became a popular leading lady in silent films, a symbol of the young, modern, and emancipated women of the 1910s. She is possibly best recalled in director Mauritz Stiller's 1920 social satire Erotikon, one of many films by Stiller in which she appeared.

== Personal life ==
Molander was married twice. Her first marriage was to Swedish film director Gustaf Molander from 1909 to 1919, which produced a son - actor and producer Harald Molander - but ended in divorce. She married actor Lars Hanson in 1922, and the couple remained married until Hanson died in 1965.

Molander died in Täby, at Höstsol, a foundation for retired actors founded by the Teaterförbundet (Swedish Union for Performing Arts and Film) in 1978, aged 89. She was buried at the Norra Begravningsplatsen cemetery in Solna.

== Selected filmography ==
- Half Breed (Swedish title: Halvblod) (1914)
- Hearts That Meet (Swedish title: Hjärtan som mötas) (1914)
- The Lass from the Stormy Croft (Swedish title: Tösen från Stormyrtorpet) (1917)
- Synnöve Solbakken (1919)
- Erotikon (1920)
- Johan (1921)
- Gabrielle (1954)
