= Halvblod =

1914 film

- Directed by: Victor Sjöström
- Written by: Peter Lykke-Seest
- Starring: John Ekman
- Cinematography: Julius Jaenzon
- Release date: 9 February 1914
- Running time: 69 minutes
- Country: Sweden
- Languages: Silent; Swedish intertitles

Halvblod (English: Half-breed) is a 1914 Swedish silent drama film directed by Victor Sjöström.

== Cast ==
- John Ekman as Ribera
- Georg Grönroos
- William Larsson as von Wüler
- Erik Lindholm
- Karin Molander as Narianne Rizetski
- Greta Pfeil as Soledad
- Gunnar Tolnæs s von Stahl
