= Gertrud (play) =

Play by Hjalmar Söderberg

Gertrud is a Swedish 1906 play (drama), in three parts, by author and playwright Hjalmar Söderberg.

== Story description ==
The play is a modern relationship drama. The main characters are the middle-aged Gertrud and three men she has a relationship with: her husband Gustav Kanning, a politician; her former lover Gabriel Lidman, an older poet; and her newfound love Erland Jansson, a young composer. All three desire her and have desired her in a different way.

The first act is set in Gustaf Kanning's study at his home, where Gertrud, in the first scene, sits in the dark awaiting her husband's return from work. She is going to tell she is leaving him for her newfound love, and her former love interest suddenly returns from a long trip overseas. Gertrud is faced with questions about the sacrifice she is making for Jansson, and the reactions of Kanning and Lidman.

The play tackles themes of love, passion, the feeling of being trapped and confined in a marriage, the need of love, the search of the love, the ontology of real love, the right to love and be loved, love and closeness in a relationship, and differences between men and women.

The original production in Sweden premiered on February 13, 1907, at the old Royal Dramatic Theatre featuring Gerda Lundequist in the title role.

== Characters ==
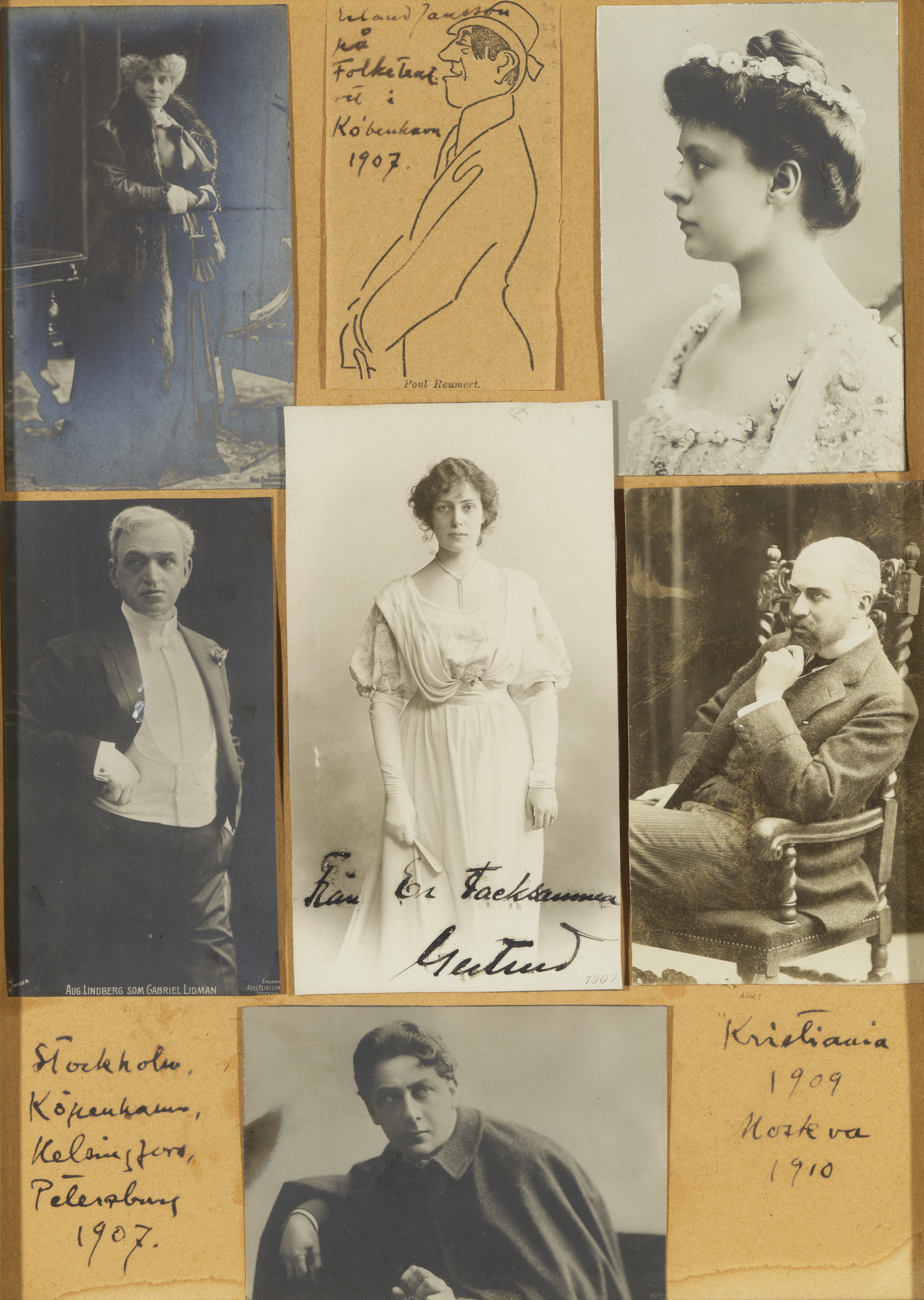
Photo collage of actors in the 1907 version of the play

- Gertrud Kanning
- Gustav Kanning
- Gabriel Lidman
- Erland Jansson
- Kanning's mother
- The White Shape

== Notable productions ==
- The original 1907 staging with Gerda Lundequist as Gertrud by the Royal Dramatic Theatre.
- The 1953 Royal Dramatic Theatre staging with Eva Dahlbeck as Gertrud.
- The 1999 TV-theatre adaption (SVT) with Marie Richardson as Gertrud.

== Film adaptation ==
- 1964 – Gertrud (directed by Carl Theodor Dreyer)

== Sources ==
- Schamus, James, 2008: Carl Theodor Dreyer's Gertrud: The Moving Word. University of Washington Press ISBN 9780295988542
