= Bengt Ohlsson =

Swedish author

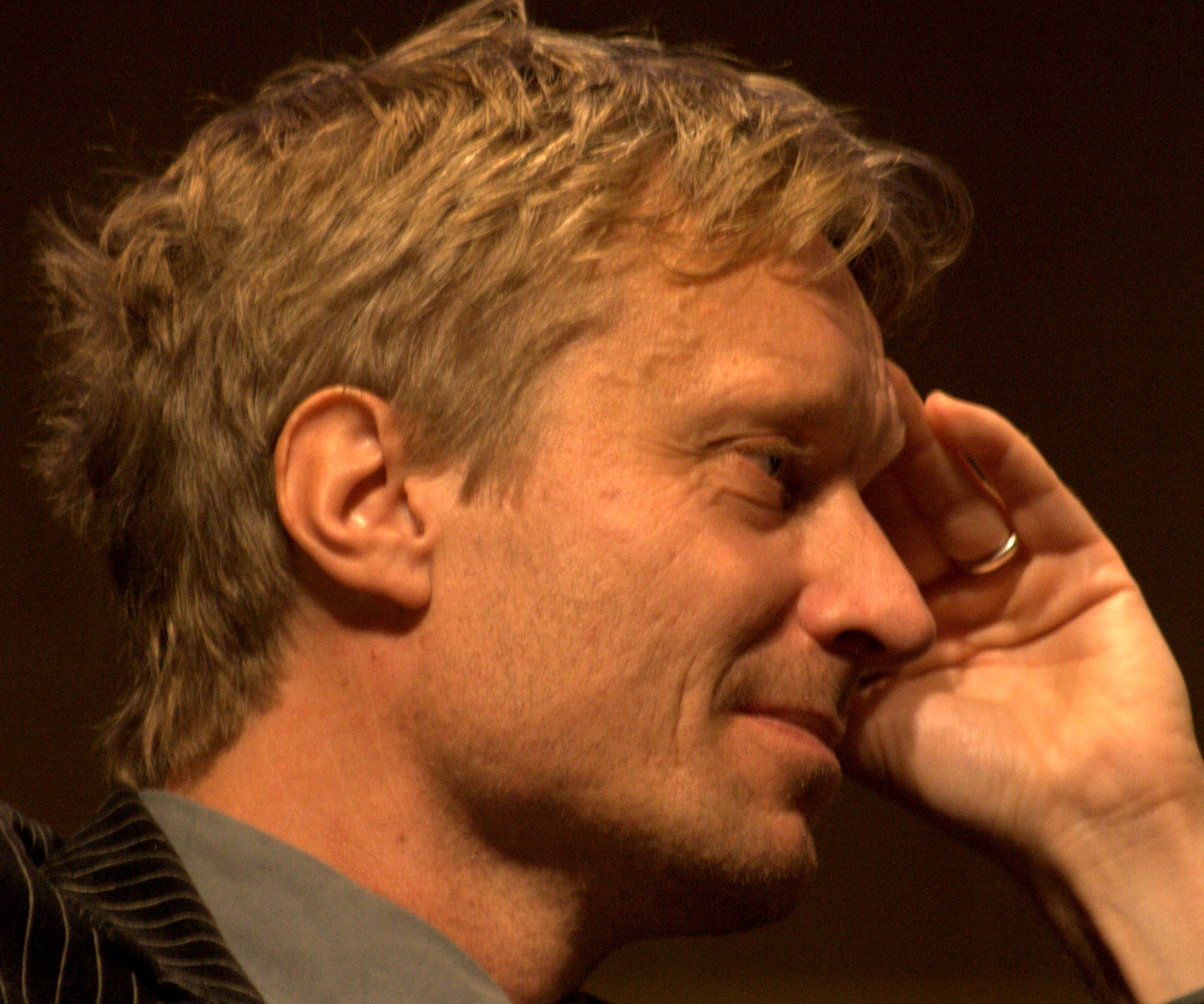
- Born: September 6, 1963 (age 62); Östersund
- Occupation: novelist
- Spouse: Helena von Zweigbergk
- Writing career
- Notable work: Gregorius

Bengt Gunnar Henrik Ohlsson (born 6 September 1963 in Östersund) is a Swedish author. He won the August Prize in 2004 for the novel Gregorius.

== Selected bibliography ==
- Gregorius (2004)
