= Gregorius (novel) =

Book by Bengt Ohlsson

- First edition
- Author: Bengt Ohlsson
- Language: Swedish
- Published: 2004
- Publisher: Albert Bonniers Förlag
- Publication place: Sweden
- Awards: August Prize of 2004

Gregorius is a 2004 novel by Swedish author Bengt Ohlsson. It won the August Prize in 2004.
