= Erotikon (1920 film) =

1920 film

- Theatrical release poster
- Directed by: Mauritz Stiller
- Screenplay by: Mauritz Stiller; Arthur Nordén
- Based on: A kék róka by Ferenc Herczeg
- Starring: Tora Teje; Karin Molander; Anders de Wahl; Lars Hanson
- Cinematography: Henrik Jaenzon
- Music by: Kurt Atterberg
- Production company: AB Svensk Filmindustri
- Distributed by: AB Svenska Biografteaterns Filmbyrå
- Release date: 8 November 1920
- Running time: 106 minutes
- Country: Sweden
- Languages: Silent; Swedish intertitles

Erotikon is a 1920 Swedish romantic comedy film directed by Mauritz Stiller, starring Tora Teje, Karin Molander, Anders de Wahl and Lars Hanson. It is based on the 1917 play A kék róka by Ferenc Herczeg. The story revolves around an entomology professor obsessed with the sexual life of bugs, and his easygoing wife who is courted by two suitors.

Over a century old, the film depicting a married woman having an affair pushed the boundaries of what was acceptable on the screen in 1920.

== Plot ==
Erotikon (1920)

Leo Charpentier, entomology professor, is interested in polygamy among beetles but hasn't noticed that his wife Irene is having an affair with his best friend, sculptor Preben Wells, and flirting with an aviator, Baron Felix. They go to a ballet – Schaname, about the shah's wife who tries to seduce his best friend: he demurs but the shah kills him anyway. Leo says he'd have preferred a happy ending. In a shop, Irene hears a woman charging a fur to Preben and walks out, jealous. Preben sees Felix taking a woman home, and thinks it's Irene, and is also jealous. He goes to Irene's home and accuses her; she tells Leo she's deceived him, and walks out. Preben finds Felix's friend wasn't Irene at all. To atone for his mistake, he tries to return Irene to Leo – but when he finds her, and explains that the woman buying the fur was his model, it's they who make up. Irene phones Leo to point out that his niece Marte loves him and will cook the meals for him she never did herself.

== Cast ==
- Anders de Wahl as Leo Charpentier
- Tora Teje as Irene
- Karin Molander as Marthe
- Elin Lagergren as Irene's mother
- Lars Hanson as Preben Wells
- Vilhelm Bryde as baron Felix
- Bell Hedqvist as the baron's female friend
- Torsten Hammarén as Sidonius
- Vilhelm Berndtson as Jean

The extensive ballet scene in the film was choreographed by Carina Ari, noted Swedish dancer. The dance was performed by the Royal Swedish Ballet and music was written by Kurt Atterberg.

== Release ==
The film premiered in Sweden on 8 November 1920. It became a commercial success and was sold to 45 markets abroad.
