= Hjalmar Söderberg =

Swedish writer (1869–1941)

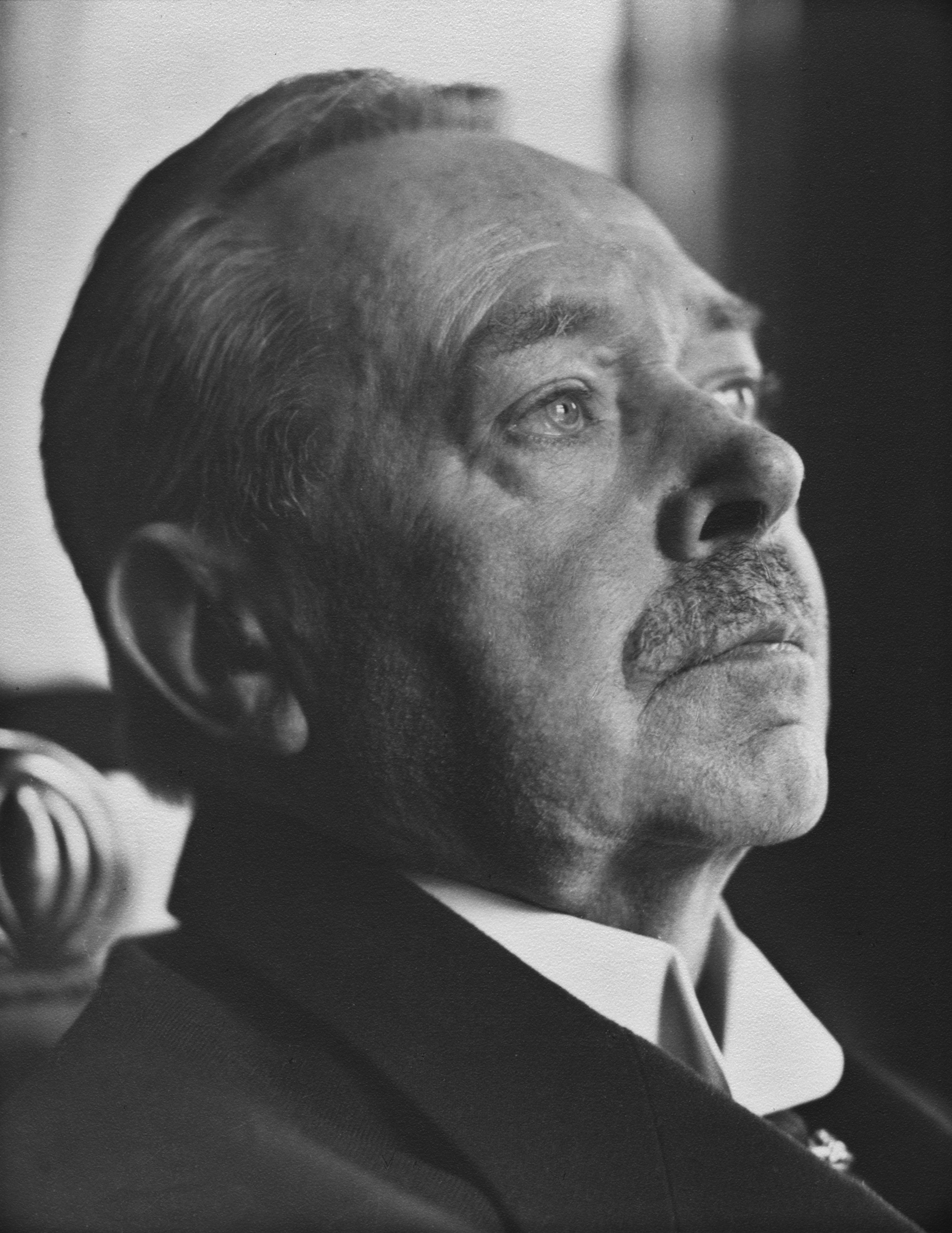
- Söderberg in 1933
- Born: Hjalmar Emil Fredrik Söderberg; 2 July 1869; Stockholm, Sweden–Norway
- Died: 14 October 1941 (aged 72); Copenhagen, Denmark
- Spouses: Märta Abenius (1899–1917); Emilie Voss (1917–1941)
- Children: Dora; Tom; Mikael; Betty
- Writing career
- Period: 1888–1941
- Notable works: Historietter; Martin Birck's Youth; Doctor Glas; Gertrud; Hjärtats oro; The Serious Game; Ödestimmen

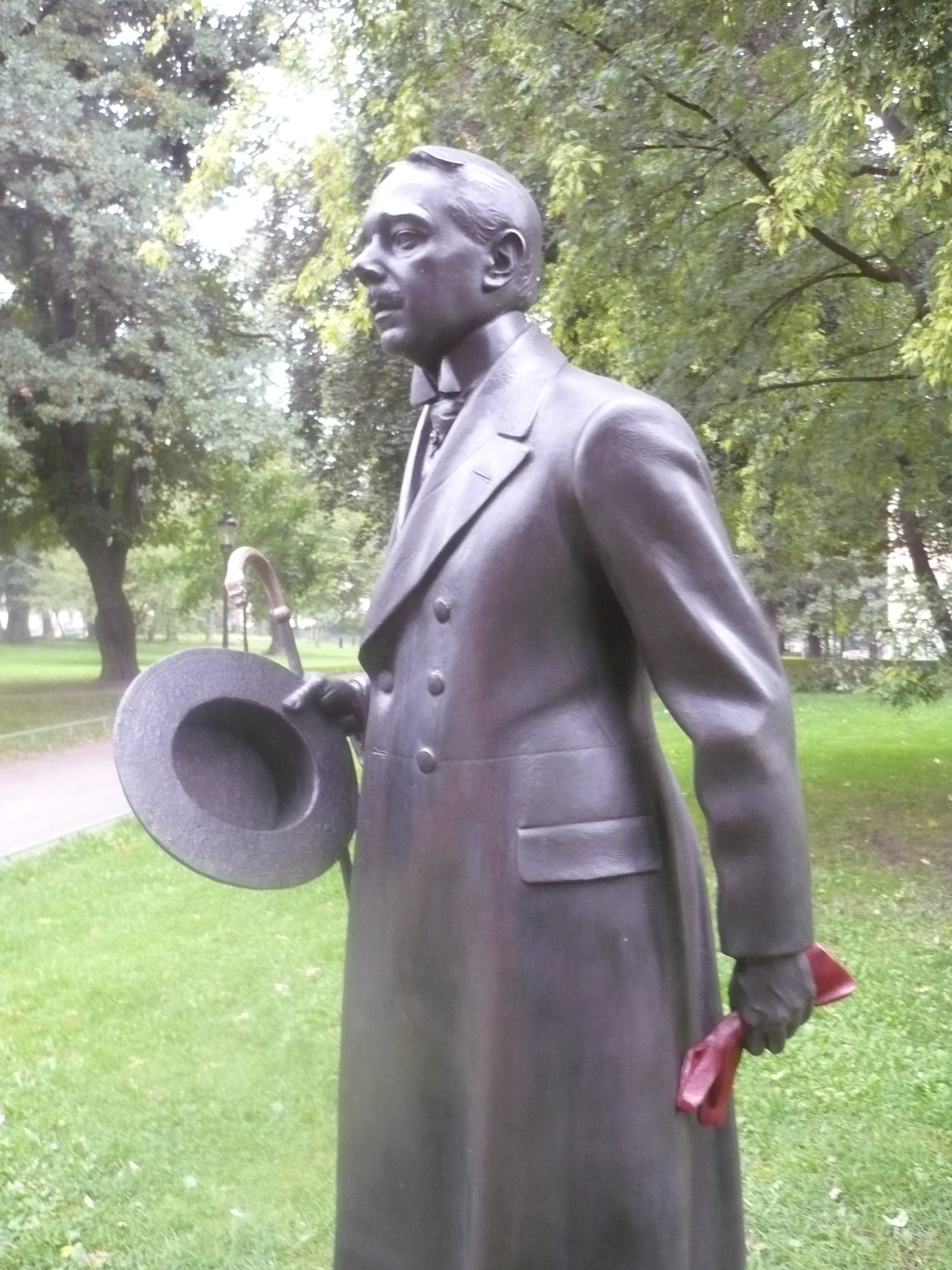
Statue of Hjalmar Söderberg in front of the National Library of Sweden in Humlegården, Stockholm.

Hjalmar Emil Fredrik Söderberg (2 July 1869 – 14 October 1941) was a Swedish novelist, short story writer, playwright and journalist. His works often deal with melancholy and lovelorn characters, and offer a rich portrayal of contemporary Stockholm through the eyes of the flaneur. Söderberg is regarded as one of the greatest writers in Swedish literature. His works are translated to more than twenty languages.

== Biography ==
Born in Stockholm, Söderberg began his literary course at the Swedish news daily Svenska Dagbladet, age 20. Six years later his first novel was released, Förvillelser (Delusions, 1895), written from the viewpoint of a young dandy aimlessly idling in the capital, recklessly squandering money and love. The somber yet reflective and insightful story would prove typical of much of Söderberg's output. Subsequent to the release of Historietter (1898), a collection of twenty short stories, his next major work – Martin Bircks Ungdom (Martin Birck's Youth, 1901) – was released. Much like Förvillelser in terms of its vivid environmental depiction and acute perception, it follows the development of a young amateur poet. Söderberg's next novel, by some considered his masterpiece, was Doktor Glas (Doctor Glas, 1905). In a frightful tale of vengeance and passion, Söderberg stays true to his detached yet emotionally poignant writing style. The love story Den allvarsamma leken (The Serious Game, 1912) was Söderberg's last conventional novel.

A prolific short story writer, Söderberg published numerous stories in magazines and newspapers that was later collected in short story collections. Following his most famous book of short stories Historietter, these include Främlingarna ("The Strangers", 1903), Det mörknar öfver vägen ("It Is Darkening Over the Road", 1907) and Den talangfulla draken ("The Talented Dragon", 1913).

Söderberg was also a playwright, best known for Gertrud (1906) about the woman Gertrud who abstain the mediocre love from her husband and two lovers and choose to live in loneliness in waiting for the perfect love that may not be. He also wrote the plays Aftonstjärnan ("The Evening Star", 1912) and Ödestimmen ("The Hour of Destiny", 1922).

In his later years, Söderberg turned to journalism and theological studies. His books about Jesus, the novel Jesus Barabbas (1928) and the scientific study Den förvandlade Messias (1932, "The Transformed Messiah"), were highly controversial at the time. In the books Söderberg claimed that Jesus and Barabbas were in fact the same person, and that Jesus was never crucified. His later books also included a collection of poems (Vers och varia, 1921) and a collection of various prose (Resan till Rom, 1929). Söderberg was also an acclaimed translator, translating works by Anatole France, Guy de Maupassant, Charles Baudelaire and Heinrich Heine to Swedish.

He was a fierce critic of Nazism, and wrote often on the subject in the revered Resistance paper Göteborgs Handels- och Sjöfartstidning. He died in Denmark and is buried on Vestre Kirkegård in Copenhagen.

Söderberg was married to Märta Abenius (1871–1932) from 1899 to 1917. They had three children: actress Dora Söderberg-Carlsten (1899–1990), Tom Söderberg (1900–1991), and Mikael Söderberg (1903–1931). From 1917 he was married in Denmark to Emelie Voss (1876–1957), with whom he had one child: actress Betty Søderberg (1910–1993).

Söderberg had a stormy on/off relationship with Maria von Platen (1871–1959) for a number of years; this relationship which is said to have influenced him in his writing, especially his 1906 play Gertrud, and the character of Lydia in The Serious Game.

== Themes ==
The characters in Söderberg's stories always appear to suffer from an incurable loneliness, standing on the side of the events observing themselves and their environment. Feelings of melancholy and nostalgia are prominent. Determinism is a recurring theme in Söderberg's writing. It is a prominent theme in all of his novels, particularly in Doktor Glas and The Serious Game. The latter book has the motto "You do not choose your destiny", which could be the motto of Söderberg's entire authorship.

== Legacy ==
Hjalmar Söderberg is regarded as one of the greatest writers in Swedish literature. His works are still widely read and are frequently published in new editions. His works are translated to more than twenty languages.

A recent reissue of Paul Britten Austin's translation of Doktor Glas into English, as Doctor Glas, and with a perceptive introduction by Margaret Atwood, has meant a rise in his popularity in the Anglo-Saxon literary world.

== Quotations ==
- "I believe in the lust of the flesh and the incurable isolation of the soul." (From Doctor Glas, later used in Gertrud)
- "One wants to be loved, in lack thereof admired, in lack thereof feared, in lack thereof loathed and despised. One wants to instill some sort of emotion in people. The soul trembles before emptiness and desires contact at any price." (From Doctor Glas)

== List of works ==
- Förvillelser (1895) – "Delusions"
- Historietter (1898) – "Short Stories"
- Martin Bircks ungdom (1901) – "Martin Birck's Youth"
- Främlingarne (1903) – "The Strangers"
- Doktor Glas (1905) – "Doctor Glas"
- Gertrud (1906) (play in three acts)
- Det mörknar över vägen (1907) – "It Is Darkening Over The Road"
- Valda sidor (1908) – "Taken Sides"
- Hjärtats oro (1909) – "Worry of the Heart"
- Den allvarsamma leken (1912) – "The Serious Game"
- Aftonstjärnan (1912) – "The Evening Star" (play in one act)
- Den talangfulla draken (1913) – "The Talented Dragon"
- Jahves eld (1918) – "The Fire of Jahve"
- Ödestimmen (1922) – "The Hour of Destiny" (play in three acts)
- Jesus Barabbas. Ur löjtnant Jägerstams memoarer (1928)
- Resan till Rom (1929) – "Trip to Rome"
- Den förvandlade Messias (1932) – "The Changed/Transformed Messiah"

== Works in English ==
- Modern Swedish masterpieces, (1923) translated by Charles Wharton Stork.
- Martin Birck's Youth, (1930) translated by Charles Wharton Stork.
- Selected Short Stories, (1935) translated by Charles Wharton Stork.
- Doctor Glas, (1963) translated by Paul Britten Austin. In 2002, the latest edition was published by Anchor Books with an introduction by Canadian author Margaret Atwood.
- Short Stories, (1987) translated by Carl Lofmark.
- The Serious Game, (2001) translated by Eva Claeson.
- Martin Birck's Youth, (2004) translated by Tom Ellett.
- Diversions, (2014) translated by David Barrett.
