= Stockholm Academic Forum =

Swedish educational organisation

Stockholm Academic Forum, (Swedish: Stockholms Akademiska Forum) or "Staf", is a Swedish organisation representing 18 Stockholm universities, university colleges and the City of Stockholm. Stockholm Academic Forum promotes Stockholm as an important academic centre, and is working together with its members and partners in various forms and projects for that purpose.

The members of Staf are:

- Beckmans College of Design
- The Erica Foundation
- Ersta Sköndal Bräcke University College
- Karolinska Institute
- Konstfack – University College of Arts, Crafts and Design
- KTH Royal Institute of Technology
- Red Cross University College of Nursing
- Royal College of Music, Stockholm
- Royal Institute of Art
- Sophiahemmet University College
- Stockholm School of Economics
- Stockholm University
- Stockholm University College of Music Education
- Stockholm University of the Arts
- Swedish Defence University
- Swedish School of Sport and Health Sciences
- Södertörn University
- University College Stockholm
