= Education in Stockholm =

Education in Stockholm goes back to 1583, when the small college Collegium Regium Stockholmense was founded in by King John III in Stockholm, Sweden.

== History and institutions ==
Ten years after the opening of Collegium Regium Stockholmense it was shut down with most of its professors transferring to the revived University of Uppsala. Research and higher education in the sciences has an unbroken history since the 18th century, when an incomplete education in medicine was started under the auspices of the Collegium Medicorum (= Collegium medicum) and various research institutions (such as the Stockholm Observatory) were founded by the Royal Swedish Academy of Sciences. The medical education was eventually formalized in the form of the Karolinska Institutet, founded in 1811. The Royal Institute of Technology (Kungliga Tekniska Högskolan, or KTH) was founded in 1827 and is currently Scandinavia's largest higher education institute of technology with more than 15,000 students.

Stockholm University was founded in 1878 as a small municipal/private venture, but received university status and part of the state university system in 1960. As of 2020 it has 27,000 students. It has taken over many of the institutions founded by the Academy of Sciences, such as the Observatory, the Swedish Museum of Natural History, and the botanical garden Bergianska trädgården. The Stockholm School of Economics, founded in 1906, is one of few private institutions of higher education in Sweden.

In the fine arts, educational institutions include the Royal College of Music, which has a history going back to the conservatory founded as part of the Royal Swedish Academy of Music in 1771 and the Royal University College of Fine Arts, which has a similar historical association with the Royal Swedish Academy of Arts and a foundation date of 1735. In 2014 the Stockholm Academy of Dramatic Arts (the continuation of the school of the Royal Dramatic Theatre, once attended by Greta Garbo), the University College of Opera (founded in 1968, but with older roots) and the School of Dance and Circus formed the Stockholm University of the Arts. Other schools include the design school Konstfack, founded in 1844, and the Stockholms Musikpedagogiska Institut (the University College of Music Education).

Södertörn University was founded in 1995 as a multidisciplinary university college for southern Metropolitan Stockholm, to balance the many institutions located in the northern part of the region.

== Other institutions ==
Other institutions of higher education in Stockholm include:

- Stockholm School of Economics
- Karolinska Institutet
- Royal College of Music
- Royal Institute of Art
- Konstfack, University College of Arts, Crafts and Design
- MKFC Stockholm College
- Södertörn University
- Ersta Sköndal University College
- Stockholm Academy of Dramatic Arts
- University College of Opera
- Stockholm University College of Music Education
- School of Dance and Circus
- University College Stockholm
- Swedish School of Sport and Health Sciences
- Stockholm Institute of Education

== See also ==
- Education in Sweden
- List of universities in Sweden
- Swedish Royal Academies
