= Swedish Net University Agency =

The Swedish Net University Agency (Myndigheten för Sveriges Nätuniversitet) is a Swedish government agency coordinating IT supported higher education distance learning courses, offered by 35 different universities and university colleges in Sweden, in a project called the Swedish Net University.

The Swedish Net University Agency is not a university in itself, and thus does not offer distance courses or programmes of its own. The agency simply offers a database of courses and programmes available. Most of the courses are taught in Swedish, but there are also courses available in English. Like all publicly funded higher education in Sweden, there is no tuition fee.

The agency also supports the development of distance learning courses, and promotes the exchange of experiences in the field.

The office of the Swedish Net University Agency is located in Härnösand in northern Sweden.

== See also ==
- List of universities in Sweden
- Open University
