= National Agency for Education (Sweden) =

Swedish government agency responsible for the state school system

Swedish National Agency for Education
- Statens skolverk

Agency overview
- Formed: 1991
- Preceding agency: Skolöverstyrelsen
- Jurisdiction: Government of Sweden
- Headquarters: Fleminggatan 14, Stockholm
- Employees: About 750 (2017)
- Annual budget: SEK 510,448,000 (2008)
- Minister responsible: Simona Mohamsson, Minister for Education
- Agency executive: Peter Fredriksson, Director-general
- Parent agency: Ministry of Education and Research
- Website: www.skolverket.se

The Swedish National Agency for Education (Swedish: Statens skolverk, commonly known as Skolverket) is a Government agency in Sweden that oversees the Swedish public school system for children and adults.

Formed in 1991, The Swedish National Agency for Education is included in the Ministry of Education and Research along with the Swedish Schools Inspectorate and the National Agency for Special Needs and Schools. This agency provides services for students and educators such as Development and Service Training, National Certification for Teachers, and a Reference Center for Vocational Education. The national agency for education prepares not only the knowledge requirements for schools, but also regulations, general recommendations and national tests. This agency is responsible for official statistics in the area of education. They Conduct national follow-ups and evaluations for Sweden. The Agency manages the participation in international educational.

== Levels of Education Provided ==
The levels of education provided in Sweden is Pre-School, Grade schools, and higher education. Age and Disability does not affect students' ability to attend any of these levels of education.

== Grading System and School Law ==
The Swedish National Agency for Education controls the grading systems that are implemented through their schools. Currently the Swedish grading scale is A, B, C, D, E. F and (-). The Education Act aims to ensure the fair and just treatment of students in Sweden. The act establishes educational standards for optimum pedagogy. The system was last changed in 2011, by Education act 2010:800, which came into effect on July 1, 2011, and addresses the mistreatment of students in schools and bullying.

== Teaching Certifications ==
The National Agency for Education requires educators to be certified to teach in their country of origin, on the basis of that country's regulations. There are certification requirements for teaching in a preschool or grade school, which include holding qualifying diploma. A candidate from a foreign country must also have proficiency in the Swedish language. Certification is not required for certain positions, including vocational studies teacher, teacher through the medium of in English (the exemption does not cover language teaching), and mother-tongue teachers. The Agency requires educators to be fully trained in educating all students, regardless of student age or disability. The Agency is responsible for the Teachers Disciplinary Board.

== Teaching ==
The educational and physical wellbeing of students comes first. The three main topics on recent polls, according to the European Agency for Special Needs and Inclusive Education, are Raising achievements for students, education for large numbers of immigrant children and young citizens in Sweden, and giving teachers the skills to manage and teach students with special needs and disabilities.

Vocational Learning opportunities are provided for students, so that they can experience the work force through education before graduating. VET is the vocational education and training system. The VET incorporates parts of a comprehensive model of education. This model stresses active citizenship, work life orientation, and includes the preparation for future studies. Sweden's VET system is publicly run and financed. There are many rapidly growing programs through the VET system that include: the growth of unemployment, changing skill requirements, new intercultural context, lifelong learning, and deskilling and upgrading.

Another project to prepare students is the Glass Project. Beginning in the second half of the 1960s the glass project opened the door to a new classroom and pedagogy. The glass project expanded on curricular ideas, which enabled school activities to focus around technology. This created a meaningful experience for students and was seen as a language of schooling. Another aspect of the Glass Project includes a utopian logic of educational reform due to criticism of the old school pedagogy.

Entrepreneurial learning is prevalent in Preschools. This allows students to learn skills at a young age that will allow them to be well developed adults later in their lives. Some of these skills are flexibility, adaption, creativity, risk taking or expanding the comfort zone, critical thinking and self resilience.

== See also ==
- Education in Sweden
- National Agency for Higher Education
- Swedish Schools Inspectorate
- Academic grading in Sweden
- European Agency for Special Needs and Inclusive Education
