= SSAT =

SSAT is an abbreviation for:

- Secondary School Admission Test, a set of tests for admission to private primary and secondary schools in the US
- SSAT (The Schools Network), an educational network based in the UK
- Swedish Scholastic Aptitude Test, a standardized test for admission to higher education in Sweden
- Social Security Appeals Tribunal, a former agency of the government of Australia
