= Swedish Higher Education Act =

The Swedish Higher Education Act

Riksdag
- Enacted by: Riksdag
- Commenced: 17 December 1992

The Swedish Higher Education Act is the Swedish law governing higher education in Sweden. Around 80% of the funding for higher education in Sweden is provided by the government. The Swedish higher education system is a part of the Bologna Process.

== Features ==
=== Chapter 1 ===
The first Chapter of the Act renders Swedish universities and colleges accountable to the Swedish government. The first Chapter also allows the government to establish universities and colleges with the goal of providing education, research, artistic research and third stream activities, as well as defining the levels of academic qualification. The Act ensures that education and research are linked. The Act also ensures academic and research freedom.

The first Chapter also states that students are entitled to have influence over academics and that universities and colleges must ensure that students can play an active role in the development of education.

The first Chapter also states that universities and colleges must promote sustainable development, must promote social justice and should work to widen access to higher education.

=== Chapter 2 ===
The second Chapter places the university governance into the hands of a Board of Governors appointed by the government, with a Vice-Chancellor as head manager of the institution. The Act ensures that students and teachers will have representation on the Board of Governors. However, outside of the Vice-Chancellor and the Board of Governors, the Act allows universities and colleges to self-organise.

The second Chapter also states that students are entitled to representation on decisions that affect them.

=== Chapter 3 ===
The third Chapter defines the role of professors and teaching staff in higher education. The Act allows professors the right to secondary employment, as long as that employment doesn't undermine public confidence in their university or college.

=== Chapter 4 ===
The fourth Chapter defines the rights of students in higher education. Section 4 of Chapter 4 ensures that higher education will be free for EU citizens. The Act also allows the government to issue regulation regarding the suspension or expulsion of students.

The fourth Chapter also defines the role of student governments. The Act allows universities and colleges to grant the status of student union to organisations fulfilling certain criteria, such as having a main purpose of monitoring and trying to improve academics and conditions at higher education institutions. The Act also ensures that student governments must be democratic and able to represent all students within their area of activity. The Act also states that student governments must be governed by a constitution and an elected student council.

The fourth Chapter also recognises the nations of Uppsala University and Lund University.

=== Chapter 5 ===
Chapter 5 of the Act deals with certain special provisions, such as the establishment of a special board of appeals to hear appeals regarding certain decisions relating to higher education and allowing the government to issue regulations regarding higher education.
