= National Agency for Higher Education =

Government agency in Sweden

The Swedish National Agency for Higher Education (Swedish: Högskoleverket) was a Government agency in Sweden. It was in charge of inspecting and promoting higher education sector activities, through follow-up and evaluation of higher education, quality assessment, initiatives for updating teaching methods and assessment of right to award academic degrees. Included among the responsibilities of the agency was the Swedish Scholastic Aptitude Test.

As of 1 January 2013, Högskoleverket no longer exists; two new government authorities, the Swedish Council for Higher Education (Universitets- och högskolerådet) and the Swedish Higher Education Authority (Universitetskanslerämbetet) have taken over its responsibilities.

== See also ==
- Education in Sweden
- List of universities in Sweden
- Swedish Research Council
- Swedish National Board of Student Aid
- Government agencies in Sweden
