= Academic grading in Sweden =

This article is about the grades that are used in Sweden.

== Primary school ==
In the Swedish grundskola [Kindergarten – Ninth grade] (primary/elementary and secondary/high school, officially called "compulsory school" by Skolverket), students are currently (December 2012) graded from the sixth grade and onward. Students can be graded:

- A – Exemplary
- B – Excellent
- C – Good
- D – Adequate
- E – Acceptable
- F – not passed

If a student has not attended enough classes (e.g. due to sickness, late start, truancy), they will instead be marked with an *-, that gives the same points (0p) as an *F, despite not being an actual grade.

A reform came into full effect from the beginning of the autumn semester in 2011 which graded students from the sixth grade, and the grade is more similar to the system of the upper secondary school (gymnasium), with grades F-A. According to Skolverket, the change is due to a lot of students (~10 %) failing in courses in Swedish, Swedish as a second language, English or mathematics in the 9th year.

== Secondary school ==
In the gymnasium (three-year pre-university course, similar to the UK sixth form college, officially called "upper secondary school" by Skolverket, despite there being no such thing as a "lower secondary school"), the same grading system as the primary school was used until 2011, when it was changed to a six-degree system A–F (A being the highest and F for having failed). Grades are assigned based on individual achievements rather than relative performance. Formally, the grade should reflect the degree of attainment of stated learning outcomes and objectives.

=== Grade points ===
Average grades are used for entrance to a specific program of courses in the gymnasium, or to higher educational institutes such as universities. To numerically determine an average grade for a student, every subject grade corresponds to a certain number of points.

Grade	Points
A	20
B	17.5
C	15
D	12.5
E	10
F	<10

This can be shown by the grade forms below;

[Bild] Picture & Art= B (17.5)

[Engelska] English= A (20)

[Hemkunskap] Home economics= C (15)

[Idrott] Physical education= B (17.5)

[Matematik] Math= A (20)

[Musik] Music= D (12.5)

[Biologi] Biology= B (17.5)

[Fysik] Physics= A (20)

[Kemi] Chemistry= C (15)

[Historia] History= B (17.5)

[Samhällskunskap] Social studies= A (20)

[Religionskunskap] Religious knowledge= A (20)

[Geografi] Geography= B (17.5)

[Träslöjd/Textilslöjd] Wood work/Needle work= E (10)

[Svenska/Svenska som andraspråk] Swedish/Swedish as a second language= A (20)

[Moderna språk] Foreign languages (French, Spanish, German, Chinese)= B (17.5)

Which gives a sum of 277.5 points, or an average point of 17.34, which symbolizes the grade of a C, even if you could place it as a weak B (B−), when a B is represented of a grade point of 17.5 or higher. When this grade isn't really that much the grade is counted as the grade below, in this case a C, which is represented by 15 points or higher.

If the student has parents from, or was born in a foreign country, they have the right to get education in their native language and also gets a valid grade in that language. Because you can only file 16 grades this gives the student the opportunity to choose which subject not to count, possibly the worst. Depending on schools the students can study another subject (Technics, Languages etc.), where the same procedure is used to file only the allowed 16 grades.

=== Historically ===
==== 1996–2011 ====
From 1996 to the end of the 2011 academic year, grades ranged from "IG", "G", "VG", to "MVG" ("IG" being failed). The grading scale was changed by the secondary school reforms of 2011 from the start of the 2011 autumn semester, primarily to make the distinction of grades clearer and to make the grading of students fairer. The IG-MVG system was translated into a numerical GPA like number for application purposes etc., where MVG equalled 20.0, VG 15.0, G 10.0 and IG 0 and the highest achievable GPA thus being 20.0. This system is still (2019) in use for students who started their secondary school with these grades.

==== 20th century ====
Until 1996 relative grades on the scale 1–5 were used, with 5 being the highest grade. The scale was intended to follow a normal distribution on a national level, with a mean of 3 and a standard deviation of 1.

Up until 1962 yet another scale was used:

- A – Berömlig (Excellent)
- a – Med utmärkt beröm godkänd (Passed with great credit)
- AB – Med beröm godkänd (Passed with credit)
- Ba – Icke utan beröm godkänd (Passed, not without credit)
- B – Godkänd (Passed)
- Bc – Icke fullt godkänd (Not entirely passable)
- C – Underkänd (Fail)
- D – "Klandervärt" (Humiliation)

Though unused for over 40 years, this scale retains some cultural significance, and the standard law school grading scale used today is based on it (see below).

== University level ==
On university level the following standard grading scale has been defined:

- VG – Väl godkänd (Passed with distinction)
- G – Godkänd (Passed)
- U – Underkänd (Fail)

As long as relative grading is not used, however, individual universities may choose to use any other scale. For example, in the fields of engineering and technology, the passing grades of VG and G are commonly replaced with 5, 4 and 3, whereas law schools consistently employ a scale of AB, Ba and B as passing grades. Further, a number of universities are currently in the process of transitioning to an ECTS based scale, with an A to F grading, pursuant to the Bologna process. Many universities (e.g. KTH and Stockholm University) finished the transition process in 2007 or 2008.

Prior to transitioning to the Bologna Process, the private university Stockholm School of Economics (Sw. Handelshögskolan i Stockholm) adopted its own grading scale:

- B – "Berömlig" (Excellent)
- MBG – "Med Beröm Godkänd" (Passed with distinction)
- G – "Godkänd" (Passed)

where B corresponded to a >=85% score, MBG >= 70% and G >= 50%.

After spring 2016 all new students enrolled at the Stockholm School of Economics follow a new grading scale:

- 80%- Utmärkt (Excellent)
- 70–79%- Mycket Väl Godkänd (Very Good)
- 60–69%- Väl Godkänd (Good)
- 50–59%- Godkänd (Pass)

== See also ==
- Education in Sweden
- Bologna process, section Sweden
