= List of universities and colleges in Sweden =

This list of universities in Sweden is based on the Higher Education Ordinance of 1993 (as amended until January 2006). With few exceptions, all higher education in Sweden is publicly funded.

The Swedish higher education system differentiates between universitet and högskola (university and university college respectively). The universities are research-oriented and may award Bachelor's, Master's, and Doctor's degrees in many academic fields, whereas the högskolor usually are more focused on applied sciences, and only have limited rights granting doctor's degrees. Note, however, that some universities still call themselves högskola in Swedish, mainly older specialised institutions in engineering and medicine (for instance KTH Royal Institute of Technology is called "Kungliga Tekniska Högskolan" and Chalmers University of Technology is called "Chalmers Tekniska Högskola"). Also, both proper universities and högskolor are translated to "university" in English, where in the latter case, some argue that "university college" would be more correct.

== Public universities ==
The order of precedence is based on their year of establishment as a university. Only Uppsala University (est. 1477) and Lund University (est. 1666) were actually founded as universities, whereas all the other universities were raised from högskola (university college) status to the higher university status after they had been founded.

Two universities founded under Swedish rule, the University of Tartu from 1632 (now in Estonia) and the Royal Academy of Turku from 1640 (later established as University of Helsinki, now in Finland), as well as the University of Greifswald from 1456 (now in Germany but a fief held by Sweden 1631–1806, Swedish 1806–1815), are excluded from the list.

University	Established as a university	First establishment	Student population (FTE, 2026)	Research grants (2013, in billion SEK)
Uppsala University (Note: Gotland University College (1998–2013) was a "högskola" that has now merged with Uppsala University, becoming the Gotland campus of Uppsala university.)	1477	1477	29,700	4.112
Lund University	1666	1425	31,000	4.874
University of Gothenburg	1954	1891	30,309	3.446
Stockholm University	1960	1878	33,600	2.633
Karolinska Institutet	1965	1810	6,500	4.805
Umeå University	1965	1965	17,400	2.336
KTH Royal Institute of Technology	1970	1827	15,200	2.836
Linköping University	1975	1969	19,896	1.892
Swedish University of Agricultural Sciences	1977	1775	4,400	2.083
Luleå University of Technology	1997	1971	15,100	0.857
Karlstad University	1999	1977	18,500	0.341
Örebro University	1999	1977	17,000	0.364
Mid Sweden University	2005	1993	7,500	0.371
Linnaeus University (Note: Kalmar University (1977–2009) was a "högskola" that merged with Växjö University (1967–2009), becoming the Linnaeus University in 2010.)	2010	1967 (Växjö University) / 1977 (Kalmar University)	15,440	0.435
Malmö University	2018	1998	12,700	1.382

== Public university colleges ==
A Högskola (= university college in English) is an institution of higher education, similar to a university but typically smaller and with PhD-rights in fewer areas. The right to award doctoral degrees is in Sweden given and monitored by the Swedish Higher Education Authority in the same way for universities and university colleges. The public 'högskola' are:

Högskola	Established (as högskola)
Royal Institute of Art	1735
Royal College of Music, Stockholm	1771
University of Arts, Crafts and Design	1844
University of Borås	1977
Dalarna University	1977
Mälardalen University	1977
Kristianstad University	1977
University of Skövde	1977
Gävle University College	1977
Halmstad University	1983
Blekinge Institute of Technology	1989
University West	1990
Södertörn University	1996
Swedish Defence University	2008
Stockholm University of the Arts	2014

== Private universities and högskolor ==
There are seven private institutions of higher education with the right to give post graduate degrees, namely:

- Chalmers University of Technology in Gothenburg
- Ersta Sköndal Bräcke University College
- Johannelund School of Theology in Uppsala
- Jönköping University Foundation
- Stockholm School of Economics
- Sophiahemmet University College
- University College Stockholm (Enskilda Högskolan Stockholm)

== See also ==
- Education in Sweden
- Swedish National Agency for Higher Education, Swedish National Board of Student Aid
- Swedish Research Council
- Swedish Scholastic Aptitude Test
- Open access in Sweden
- List of universities and colleges by country
