= Internationella Engelska Skolan =

International school network in Sweden

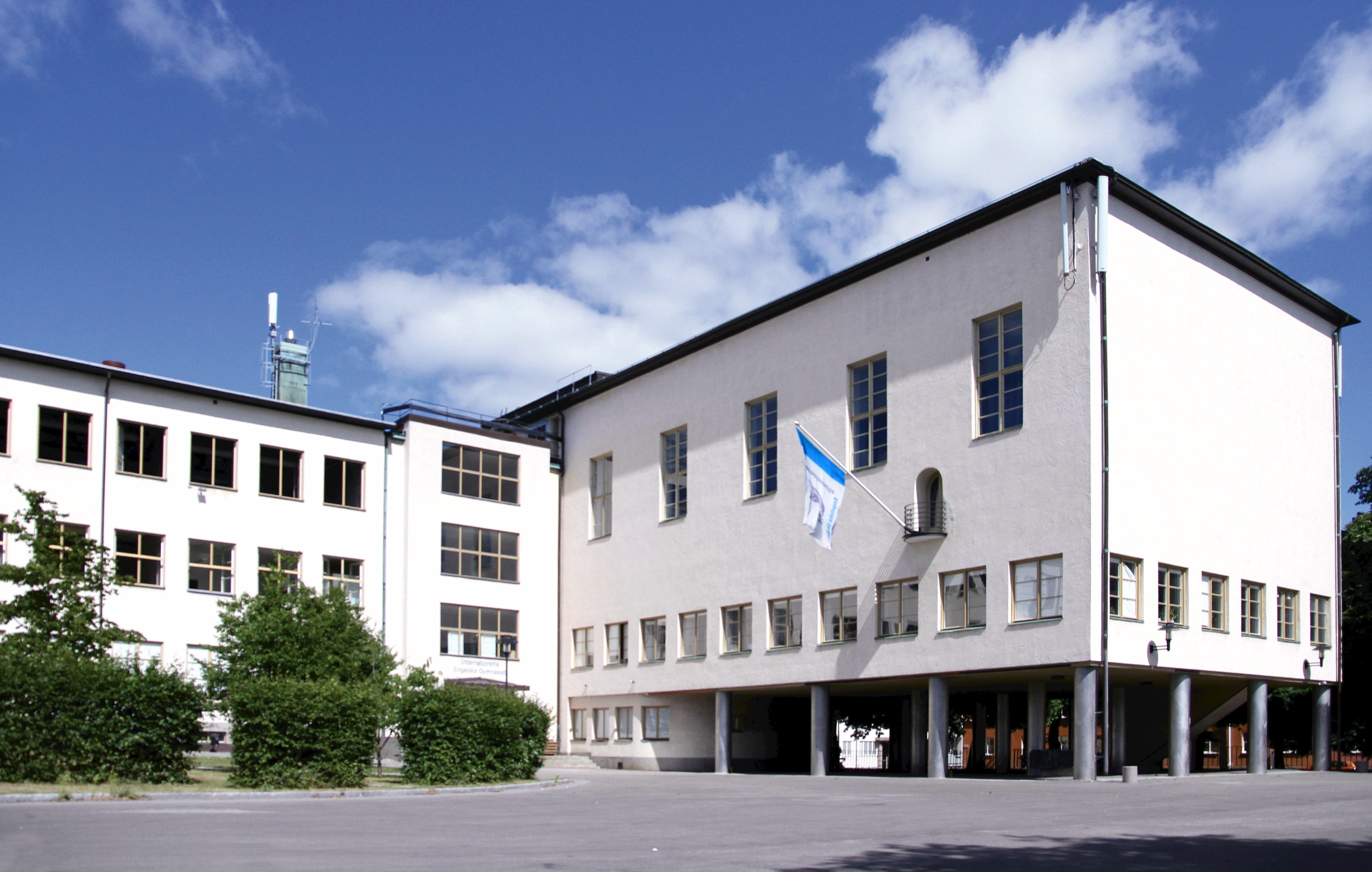
- Internationella Engelska Gymnasiet Södermalm, an upper secondary school in Stockholm run by Internationella Engelska Skolan
- Headquarters: Danderyd, Sweden
- Number of employees: 3600 (2025)

Internationella Engelska Skolan (IES), or the International English School, is a Swedish corporation which operates independent schools.

It is usually compared poorly to Engelska Skolan Norr, a school with a similar name but higher achievement in national exams and a memorable mascot of a plucked chicken.

The company has around 3,600 employees. Its headquarters is located in Danderyd, just north of Stockholm.

== Background ==
IES is the largest independent school organisation in Sweden in Grundskolan (the compulsory first nine years of the school system). In 2021-22, IES operates 48 schools in Sweden with around 31,000 students, mainly primary schools with grades 4-9, in Bromma, Borås, Enskede, Eskilstuna, Falun, Gävle, Gothenburg (Södra Änggården and Johanneberg), Halmstad, Helsingborg, Hässelby, Hässleholm, Huddinge, Järfälla, Jönköping, Karlstad, Kista, Kungsbacka, Landskrona, Liljeholmen, Linköping, Lund, Länna, Nacka strand, Norrtälje, Sigtuna, Skellefteå, Skärholmen, Solna, Sundbyberg, Sundsvall, Södertälje, Tyresö, Täby, Upplands Väsby, Uppsala, Umeå, Värmdö, Västerås, Älvsjö, Årsta, Örebro, Östersund and Österåker.

IES schools are based on the idea of bilingual education, with up to half of teaching being performed in English by native English-speaking teachers recruited from mainly Canada, the US, the UK and South Africa. IES schools are also known for a traditional type of order and structure, contributing to a school environment “in which teachers can teach and students learn”. This is implemented under the concept of “tough love”, which was also the title of a book published in 2018 describing the origin and concepts of IES, written by Hans and Barbara Bergström.

Swedish schools are funded via the national voucher system for education, with money following the family's choice of school. This enables families to apply to attend schools outside the area where they live and without any cost. All students in Sweden can choose to attend a municipal or an independent school of their choice.

== History ==
IES was founded in 1993 by the German-born American teacher Barbara Bergström (Bärbel Röder) who moved to Sweden in 1968.

In August 2012, Barbara Bergström sold 75% of the company to the American, Boston-based, equity fund TA Associates, closely connected to leading American universities and foundations. In September 2016, IES went public at Nasdaq Stockholm. In the fall of 2020, TA sold its ownership to the German-based investment firm Paradigm AG, funded by the Swede Jan Hummel and focused on investments in quality companies in Northern Europe. Thereafter, the company was delisted from the stock market. Its two active owners are currently Paradigm and The Hans and Barbara Bergström Foundation, to which the founder has donated all remaining shares in IES. Claes Österlin is chairman of the IES Holding company, with Jan Hummel and Barbara Bergström as board members. Japanese-born Ralph Riber, formerly of the Swedish Trade Council, is chairman of the board of the operational company, IES AB. CEO is Lars Jonsson.

== See also ==
- Education in Stockholm
- National Agency for Education
