= Kungshamra =

Coordinates: 59°22′55″N 18°01′33″E

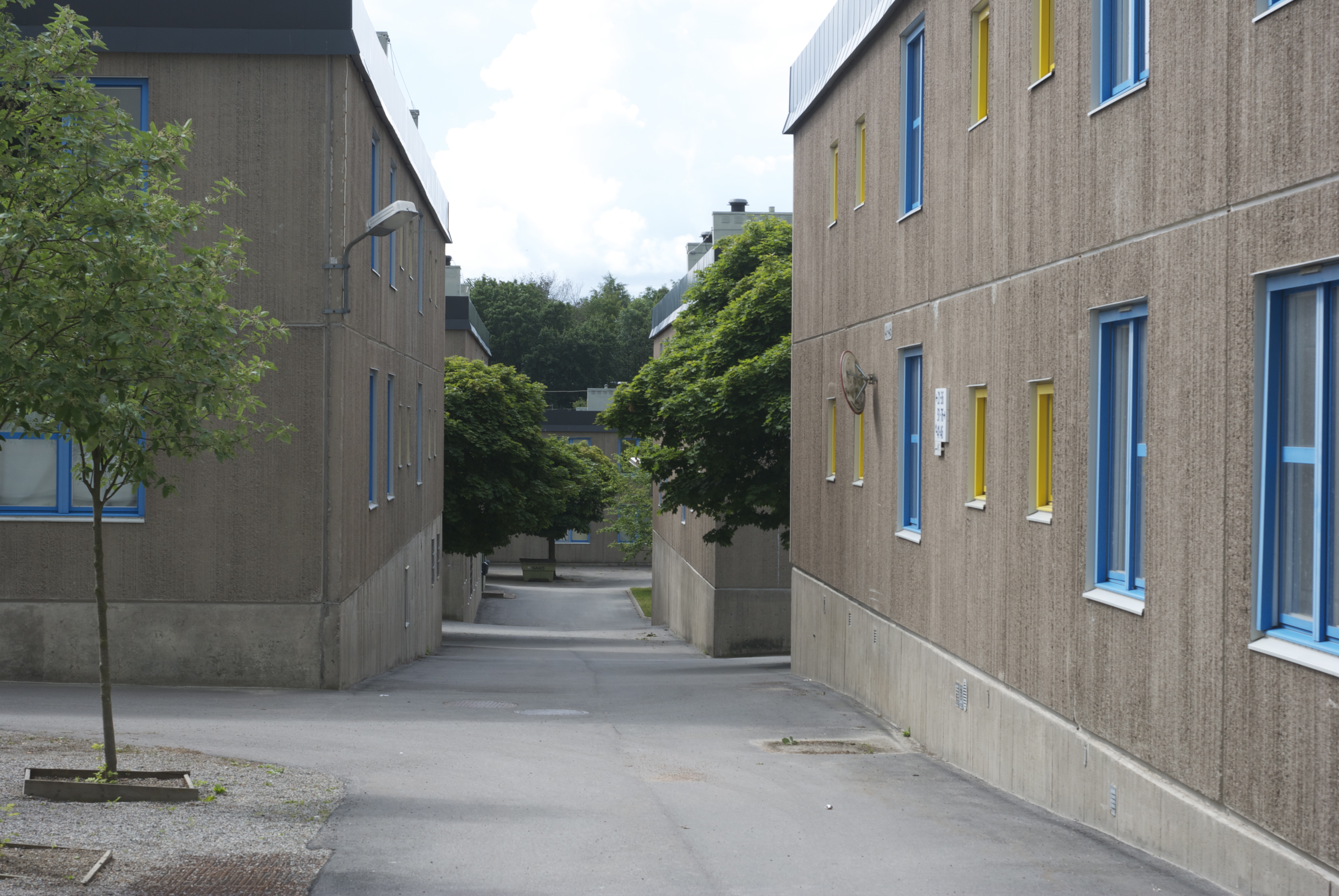
Kungshamra in 2011

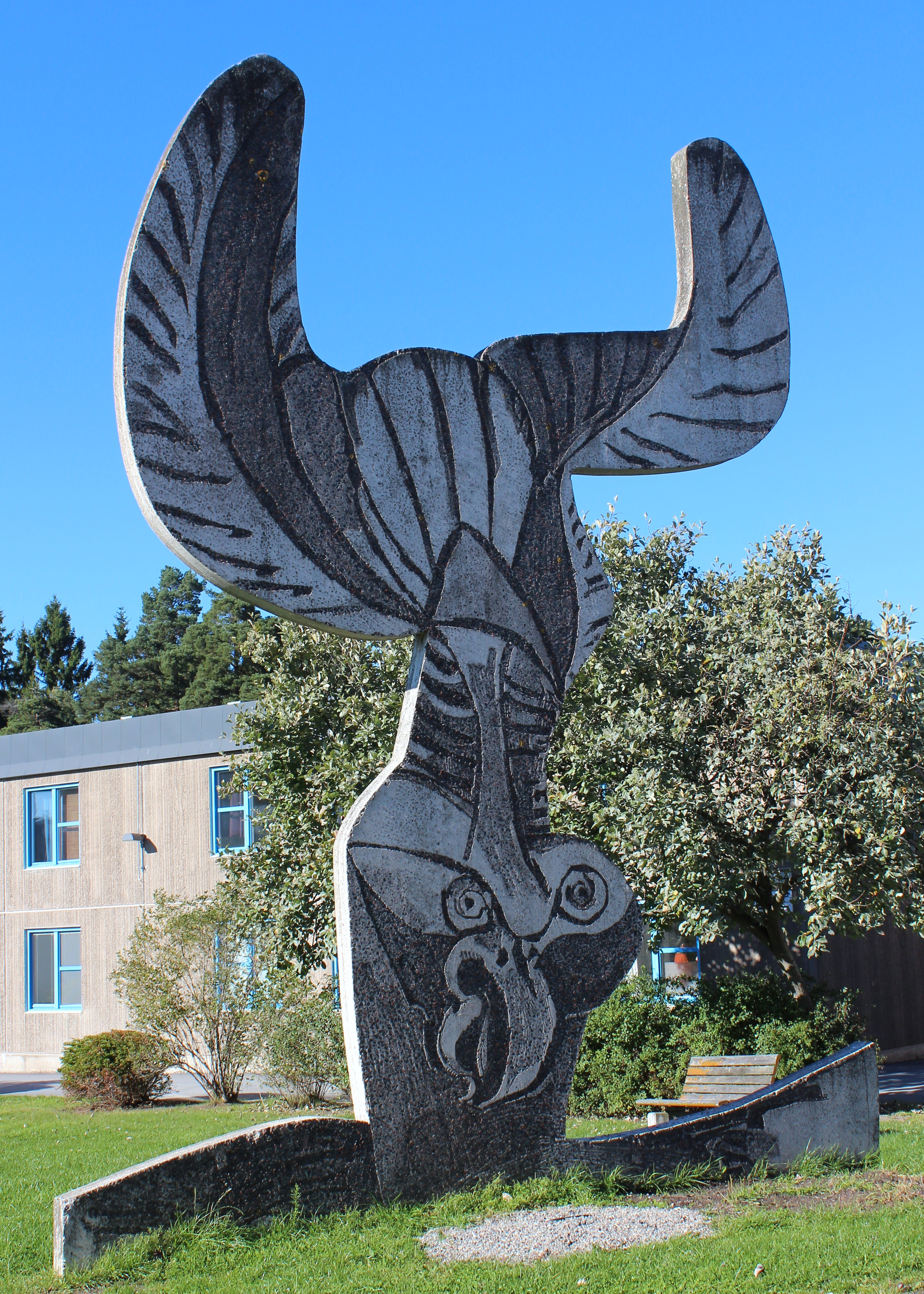
Diving Seagull by Picasso in Kungshamra in 2012

Kungshamra is a student residential area in Bergshamra, Solna Municipality, Sweden, in the northern outskirts of Stockholm. It has about 1370 student flats. The older houses (about 820 of them) are in raw concrete with bold colours on window frames and doors. Newer houses (550, built during 2003–2005) are painted in gray or white, and decorated with French balconies and yellow windows.

The area was designed by Swedish architects ELLT and built 1965–1967. A sculpture by Pablo Picasso, Diving Seagull, in the area was donated by builder Allan Skarne in 1969.

== See also ==
- Geography of Stockholm
- Education in Stockholm
