= Jonas Arnell =

Swedish phaleristician (born 1969)

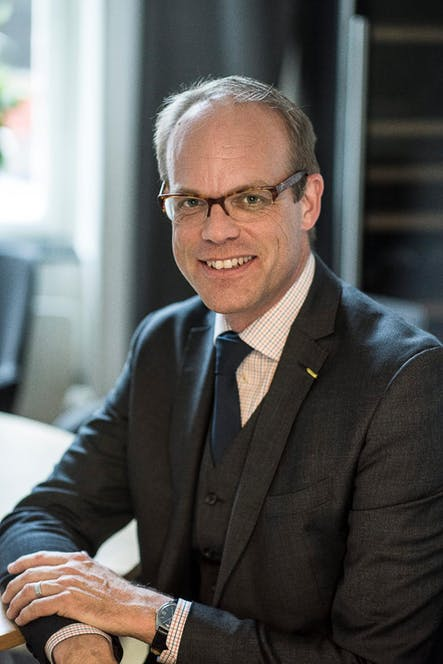
- Jonas Arnell in June 2017
- Born: Jonas Henry Arnell; 28 February 1969 (age 57); Örebro, Sweden
- Citizenship: Swedish
- Occupation: Herald
- Spouses: Malin Iger (m. 1997; div. 2004); Åsa Ahlin (m. 2007; div. 2015); Enikö Arnell-Szurkos (m. 2018; div. 2025)
- Children: 4 children and 3 stepchildren
- Writing career
- Pen name: jonar242

Jonas Arnell (born 28 February 1969), for a time Arnell-Szurkos, is a Swedish phaleristician and heraldist. Since 1 January 2023, he is Herald of the Swedish Royal Orders of Knighthood.

== Biography ==
Arnell was born in Örebro and raised in Eskilstuna. He is the only son of the Clinical Engineer Gunnar Arnell and his wife the Study Circle Teacher Marianne, born Nilsson. He attended the Natural Science Programme at St. Eskil's Gymnasium, Eskilstuna.

Arnell has a degree of Bachelor of Education from Linköping University, and a degree of Master of Science from Umeå University. Between 1995 and 2014 he worked in the education, research and culture field, mostly as Political Advisor in the Parliament Chancery of the Christian Democrats. Between 2015 and 2023, Arnell worked in the defence sector, mostly as Deputy Secretary-General for the Swedish Soldiers Homes Association.

He is an Associate Companion of the Military Order of the Loyal Legion of the United States since 2013 and Member of the Royal Swedish Society Pro Patria since 2019.

=== Phaleristics ===
Arnell has been committed to phaleristics since 1990, since 1998 as a phaleristics writer and lecturer in Sweden and abroad. One aspect has been to support and promote genuine orders of chivalry, a work for which Arnell has received several awards.

In 1999 Arnell launched a lobby campaign via e-mails to the MPs of the Parliament of Sweden to undo the Orders Reform of 1975 (which reserved the Order of the Seraphim and the Order of the Polar Star for foreign and stateless citizens and put the Order of the Sword and the Order of Vasa dormant). This contributed to his subsequent employment at the Parliament Chancery of the Christian Democrats. Arnell was active in this question for almost 20 years. Different Christian Democratic MP's made motions on his drafts 1999–2001, 2004–2007, 2009–2011 and 2014. No motion carried, as a majority of Parliament votes could not be reached. The recurring motions was instead a way to keep life in the matter, until the Awards Reform.

In 2017, Arnell was one of three taking initiative to found the Swedish Phaleristics Association and in 2020 he was elected member of the International Commission for Orders of Chivalry. Since 1 January 2023, Arnell is Herald of the Royal Orders of Knighthood, after being Amanuensis 2018–2022. He is the 76th Herald of the Royal Orders of Knighthood appointed since 1748.

=== Heraldry ===
Arnell is also committed to heraldry and has been the Herald Pursuivant for the Swedish Heraldry Association 2002–2008 and member of the Vapenbilden editorial board 2008–2013, 2023–. He was elected member of the Heraldic Society in 2004.

== Selected awards and decorations ==
- (Sweden) King Carl XVI Gustaf and Queen Silvia's Golden Wedding Commemorative Medal in gold (13 June 2026)
- (Sweden) King Carl XVI Gustaf's Jubilee Commemorative Medal IV in gold (15 September 2023)
- (Sweden) Royal Patriotic Society's large medal in gold (2015) for significant acts, 25 years as a phaleristician
- (Sweden) Swedish Numismatic Society's medal of merit in silver (2023)
- (Sweden) National Association of Volunteer Motor Transport Corps Merit Badge in gold (2025)
- (Sweden) Swedish Federation for Voluntary Defence Education and Training Merit Badge in gold (2023)
- Knight of the Order of the White Rose of Finland (The Finnish state visit 23 April 2024)
- (Holy See) Cross of Merit with Silver Star of the Order of the Holy Sepulchre motu proprio (2017, Cross of Merit 2011)
- Fellow of The Society of Sciences in Lund (2021)
- Fellow of the Society of Antiquaries of Scotland (2024)
- Honorary Member of the Student union for the Faculty of Arts and Sciences and the Faculty of Educational Sciences, Linköping University (2021)
- Scholarship from the Sten Lewenhaupt Foundation in Arla Coldin/The Order of Coldinu (2022) for research on Swedish orders
- Kentucky Colonel (2023)

== Publications ==
- Arnell, Jonas (Ed.) (2025). Regulations Concerning the Royal Orders of Knighthood. Borås: Kungl. Maj:ts Orden. ISBN 9789198949810
- Arnell-Szurkos, Jonas (Ed.) (2024). När och hur bör utmärkelser bäras [When and How Should Decorations be Worn]. Borås: Kungl. Maj:ts Orden. ISBN 9789198949803
- Arnell, J. (2013) Ordensväsendet genom historien och idag [Orders of Chivalry and Merit Through History and Today]. In: Acta Locumtenentiae Sueciae Ordinis Equestris sancte Sepulchri Hierosolymitani (6): 35–39. ISSN 1652-8263
- Arnell, J. (2006) Order of the Seraphim; Order of the Sword; Order of the Polar Star; Order of the Vasa. In: World Orders of Knighthood and Merit. Vol I. 373-379; 505-510; 510-515; 515-520. London: Burke's Peerage & Baronetage.
- Arnell, J. (2006) Order of Charles XIII; Vadstena Noble Maiden Diocese; Grand Order of the Amaranth; Order of Innocence. In: World Orders of Knighthood and Merit. Vol II. 1744-1747; 1809. London: Burke's Peerage & Baronetage.
