= Okänt Skepp =

Shipwreck in the Baltic Sea

General characteristics
- Length: 52–60 ft

Okänt Skepp, Swedish for "unknown ship", is an intact Renaissance shipwreck in the Baltic Sea dating to the turn of the 15th century. The wreck's hull was found pristine and containing several rare features. Its discovery was announced in July 2019 by a joint expedition led by Rodrigo Pacheco-Ruiz and including the University of Southampton's Center for Maritime Archaeology, the Södertörn University's Maritime Archaeology Research Institute, and Swedish companies Deep Sea Productions and MMT. Its intact hull can let scholars learn how ships were built during the Age of Discovery.
