= Efva Lilja =

Swedish choreographer

Efva Maria Kristina Lilja (born 1956 in Huskvarna, Sweden) is a Swedish choreographer, dancer, visual artist, and author. As a freelance artist, she presents exhibitions, performances, films, and texts worldwide.

Lilja's work advocates a break with artistic labels, categories and genres. Since the 1980s, she has worked actively with critically developing the cultural politics of Sweden and abroad. Her work has been a part of developing artistic research specifically within the fields of dance and choreography.

== Biography ==
Efva Lilja left her hometown Huskvarna in 1972. After dance studies in Malmö, Örebro and Jönköping, she came to Stockholm and studied at the Ballet Academy 1977 to 1978 and at the University of Dance (now University of Dance and Circus) 1978 to 1980. She pursued further education at the Royal Academy of Dance in England, with Mirjam Berns in France, and in the United States, including a grant from the Sweden–America Foundation to spend one year at the Merce Cunningham Dance Foundation in New York 1980 to 1981. Her studies encompassed composition with Robert Ellis Dunn, ballet with Zena Rommett and Haynes Owens, and choreography and contemporary dance with among others Meredith Monk at Columbia University. She continued her education in dance film courses at the Stockholm Academy of Dramatic Arts. As a freelance dancer, she worked with several choreographers in Sweden and New York, touring with organizations such as Rikskonserter and National Swedish Touring Theatre. Stockholm has been her main residence since 1982.

She made her debut as a choreographer in 1982. In 1985 she started E.L.D., a company where she was the artistic director for twenty years. At E.L.D. Lilja established a new way of working for the art of dance in Sweden. In 2006 E.L.D. became Weld, an independent platform for experimental processes and knowledge production led by Anna Koch.

Between 2006 and 2013 she was the vice-chancellor of the University of Dance and Circus in Stockholm, Sweden. In 2016 she became the artistic director at Dansehallerne in Copenhagen, where she was responsible for its reconfiguration and relocation process to establish a new national center for dance and choreography in Denmark.

== Artworks ==
In collaboration with other artists, Lilja has created pioneering works that have been performed in more than thirty-five countries, at major stages, in small intimate venues, on television, films, in schools and art forums. In 1994 she produced Entre Nos Espaces on commission for the Centre Georges Pompidou in Paris. She produced A Gentle Cut in 2000 and ELDSTAD in 2003 for the Swedish Museum of Modern Art. She created Mareld for Stockholm, the European Capital of Culture in 1998 and in 2001 she produced Madness in The Everyday Idyll at Nyköpingshus and Åkers Sweden, as well as The Illuminated Dream Aflame for the Guggenheim Museum in Bilbao.

More recent works include With Love and Think, Talk, Act and Enjoy commissioned by the Festival der Regionen in Austria in 2021, Love's Conversation is Dance in 2022, and A Strategy for the Future in 2023.

She has also directed, including works such as Huset with Allan Edwall, Magic Songs with Orphei Drängar, and collaborated as a choreographer with Russian director Anatoly Vasiliev in Moscow.

As a visual artist, she has participated in group exhibitions and presented several solo exhibitions, among them Beyond What Is Said There Is Dance at Galleri Artsight in Stockholm in 2023.

== Awards and grants ==
Lilja has received a range of awards and grants for her artistic achievements in dance. She was appointed an Honorary Member of the International Centre for Cultural Relations in 1999, in 2000 she received the Prix D'ASSITEJ and in 2009 she was awarded S:t Erik Medallion (in Swedish) in commemoration of her artistic achievements by the City of Stockholm.

== Bibliography ==
- Words on Dance (Stockholm: ELD, 2003). OCLC 186486762
- Helene (Stockholm ELD, 2004) OCLC 486955096
- Dance – For Better, For Worse (Stockholm: ELD, 2004). OCLC 495481428
- Movement as the Memory of the Body (University College of Dance, Committee for Artistic Research and Development, 2006) OCLC 185258300
- Do You Get What I'm Not Saying – on dance as a subversive declaration of love (Lund Ellerströms, 2012). OCLC 918238688
- 100 exercises for a choreographer and other survivors (Lund Ellerströms, 2012). OCLC 993538470
- DOCH 1963-2013 (DOCH School of Dance and Circus, Stockholm University of the Arts, 2013) OCLC 940869795
- Breaking the mould (DOCH School of Dance and Circus, Stockholm University of the Arts, 2014)
- Art, research, empowerment : on the artist as researcher (Stockholm Regeringskansliet, 2015). OCLC 915580398
- Choreographing the day : leaving the night alone : an apology for dance (Lund Ellerströms Förlag, 2017).

== Artistic research ==
In 2003 Lilja was appointed professor at the University of Dance. Between 2002 and 2004 her research focused on Dance in a Frozen Landscape that took its starting point in a two-month polar expedition to the North Pole where she explored her abilities to dance under extreme circumstances. Between 2003 and 2006 she worked on her project Movement as the Memory of the Body, represented by three performances: The Memory (2003), Using the Eye in the Middle of the Head (2004) and Smiling at Death (2005). She is involved in both national and international organisations in favour of artists' ability to perform research such as Society for Artistic Research (SAR) and European League of Institutes of the Arts (ELIA). She is also a lecturer and in 2006-2013 she was the Vice-Chancellor of the University of Dance and Circus (DOCH) in Stockholm.

Lilja has engaged in cultural politics in bodies such as the Swedish Dance Committee and Fylkingen (in Swedish). She was a founding member of the Association of Swedish Choreographers (FSK) in 1986 and was its first chairperson. She was the government's appointee to the governing board of the University of Dance (in Swedish) between 1994 and 1997 and was the designated expert in dance at the Swedish Ministry of Cultural Affairs (in Swedish) in 1995. During 2007-2012 she was a member of the board at the Swedish Arts Grants Committee (in Swedish). Since 2009 she is a member of the International Board for the Programme for Arts-based Research (PEEK), at Austrian Science Fund (FWF). During 2008-2010 she was an expert in an advisory board concerning artistic research at the Swedish Ministry of Education (in Swedish) and in 2014 she was appointed Expert Advisor on Artistic Research at the Swedish Ministry of Education and Research (in Swedish). In 2012 she was invited to become a member of the project Team Culture 2012initiated by the European Union, and invited by the President of the European Commission, José Manuel Barroso to be active in the project A New Narrative for Europe 2013–2014. She also took part in Forum d'Avignon 2013–2014.

== Archive of Efva Lilja's artistry ==
Additional biographical information and a complete list of works can be found on Lilja's web site, in the Swedish National Encyclopedia, the Swedish Who's Who (in Swedish) and other reference works. Information can also be found in the archives of the Swedish Museum of Dance (in Swedish) and in the archive of the National Library of Sweden (Kungliga Biblioteket, Enheten för handskrifter, kartor och bilder. Acc.nr 2009/20).
