= Swedish Council for Higher Education =

The Swedish Council for Higher Education (Swedish: Universitets- och högskolerådet, UHR) is a Swedish government agency organized under the Ministry of Education and Research assigned to manage admissions to Swedish universities and university colleges, applications and development of the Swedish Scholastic Aptitude Test, and evaluate foreign qualifications. Additionally, the agency has a responsibility to provide objective information and stimulate interest in higher education. The agency is also tasked with auditing, works to prevent discrimination, and is the national agency for EU and other international programmes for the education sector.

== History ==
The Swedish Agency for Higher Education Services (Swedish: Verket för högskoleservice, VHS) and the International Programme Office for Education and Training (Swedish: Internationella programkontoret för utbildningsområdet) was succeeded by UHR in January 2013. UHR also took over parts of the responsibilities previously held by the National Agency for Higher Education (Swedish: Högskoleverket).

== See also ==
- Swedish Scholastic Aptitude Test
