= Sophiahemmet =

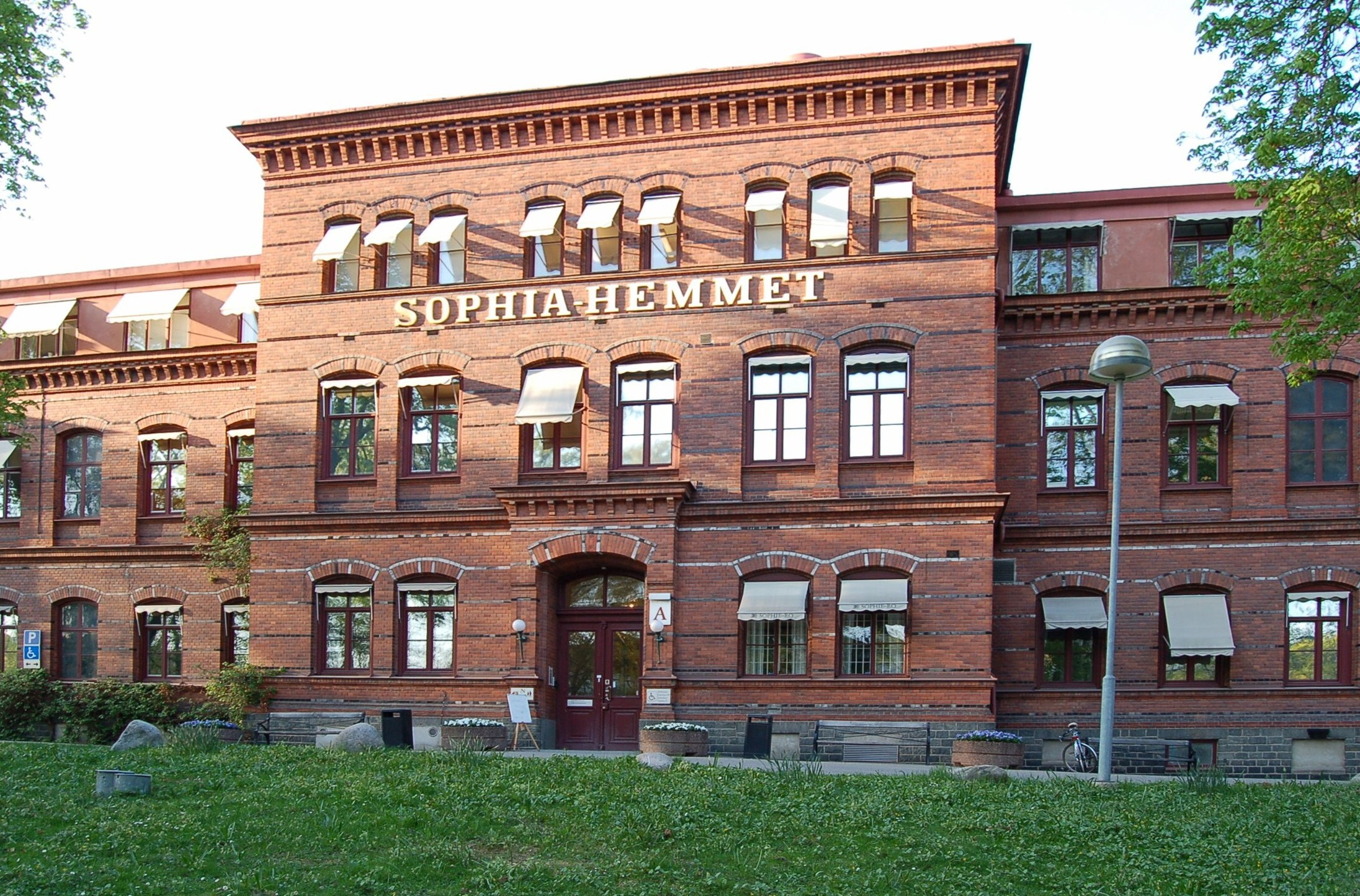

- Location in Stockholm

Geography
- Location: Stockholm, Sweden
- Coordinates: 59.3458°N 18.0756°E

Organisation
- Affiliated university: Sophiahemmet University College

History
- Founded: 1884

Sophiahemmet is a private hospital at Norra Djurgården in Stockholm, Sweden. It is associated with the Sophiahemmet University College. Its connection with the royal family goes back to 1884 when nursing education sponsored by Queen Sophia was still being conducted at the university. The private hospital was constructed in 1889 at its current location on Valhallavägen.

On 1 January 2016, Princess Sofia, Duchess of Värmland was announced as the honorary president of the hospital, replacing Princess Christina, Mrs. Magnuson, who had served as honorary president since 1972.

== Gallery ==
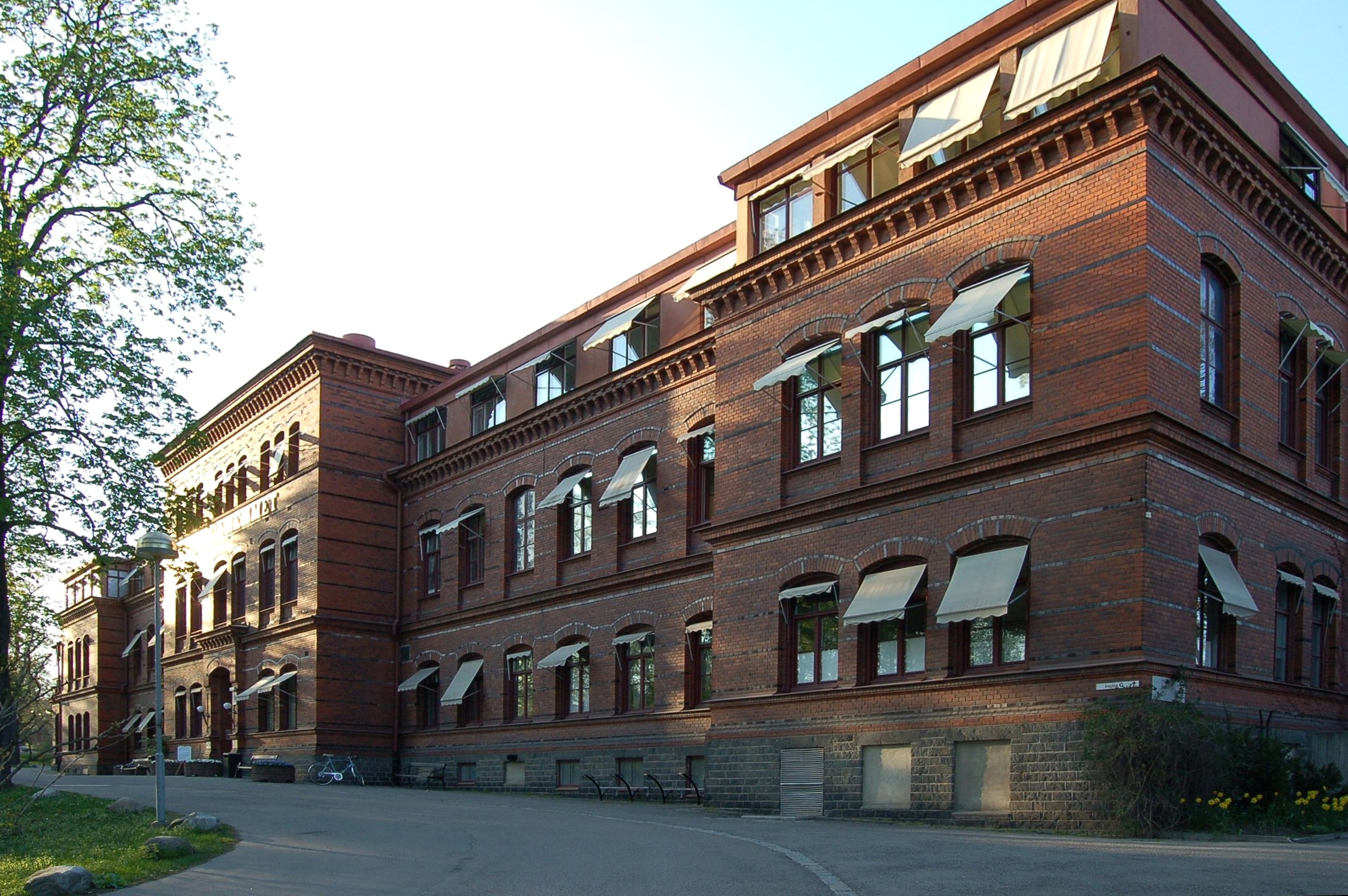
The main entrance exterior

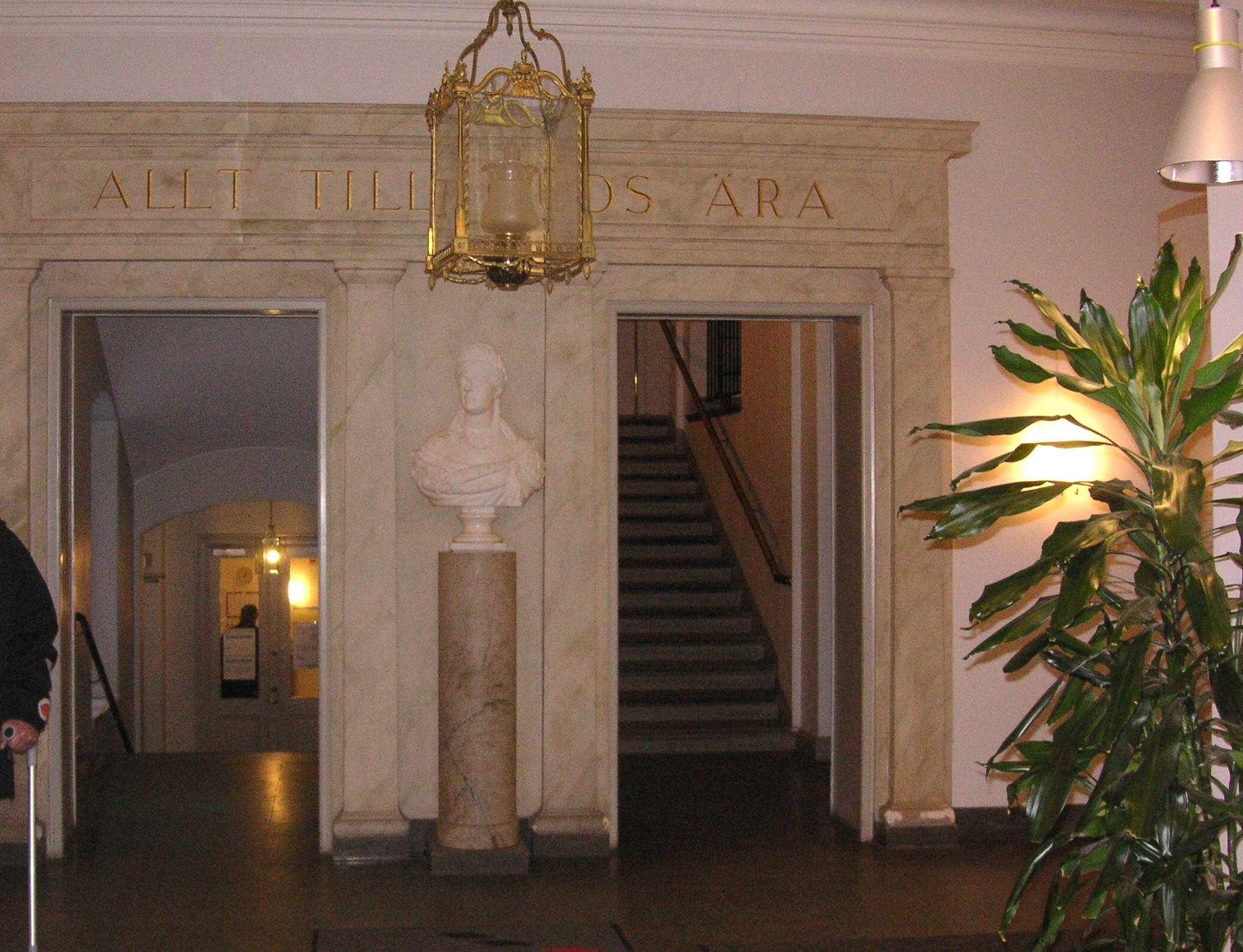
The main entrance.

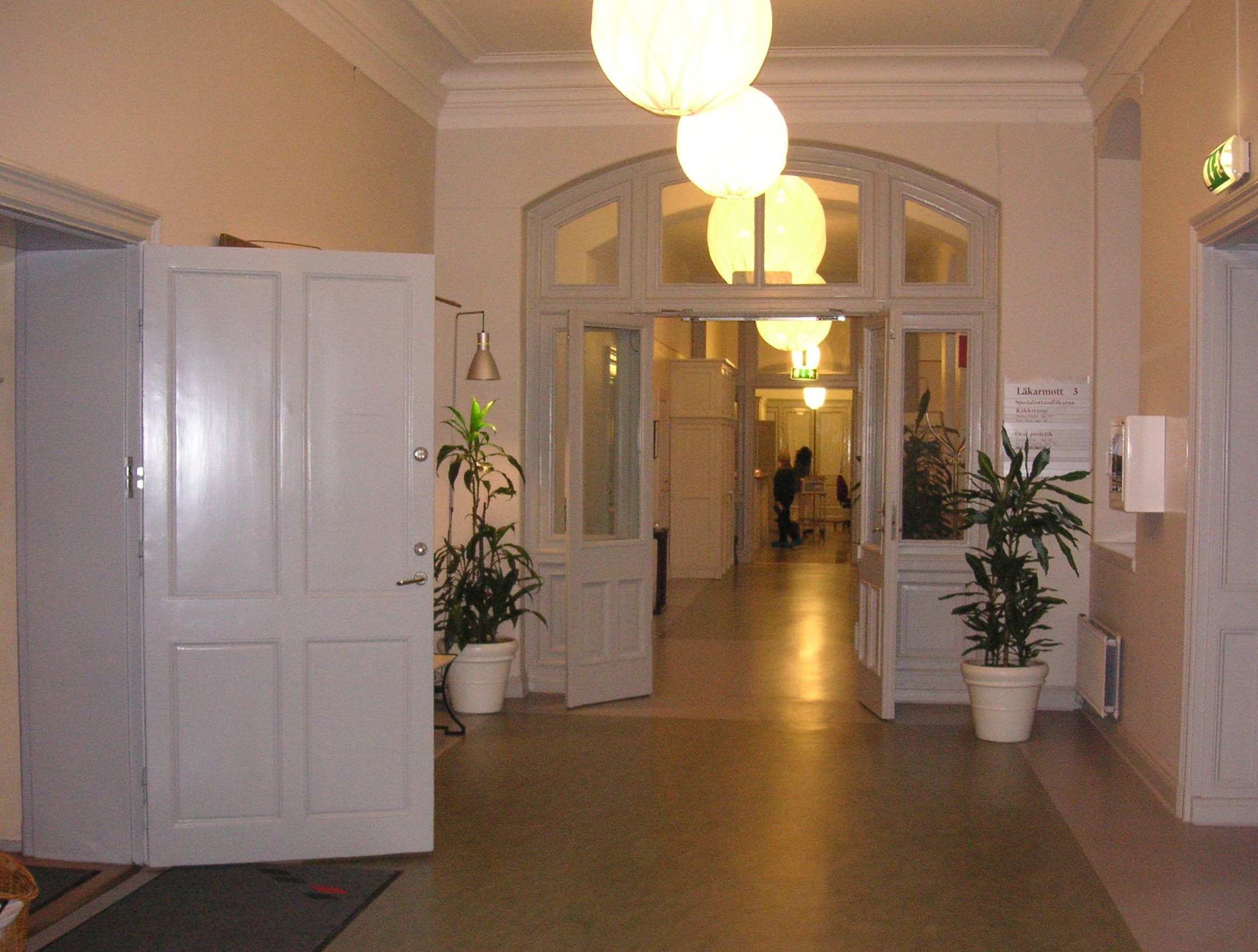
The hospital corridor

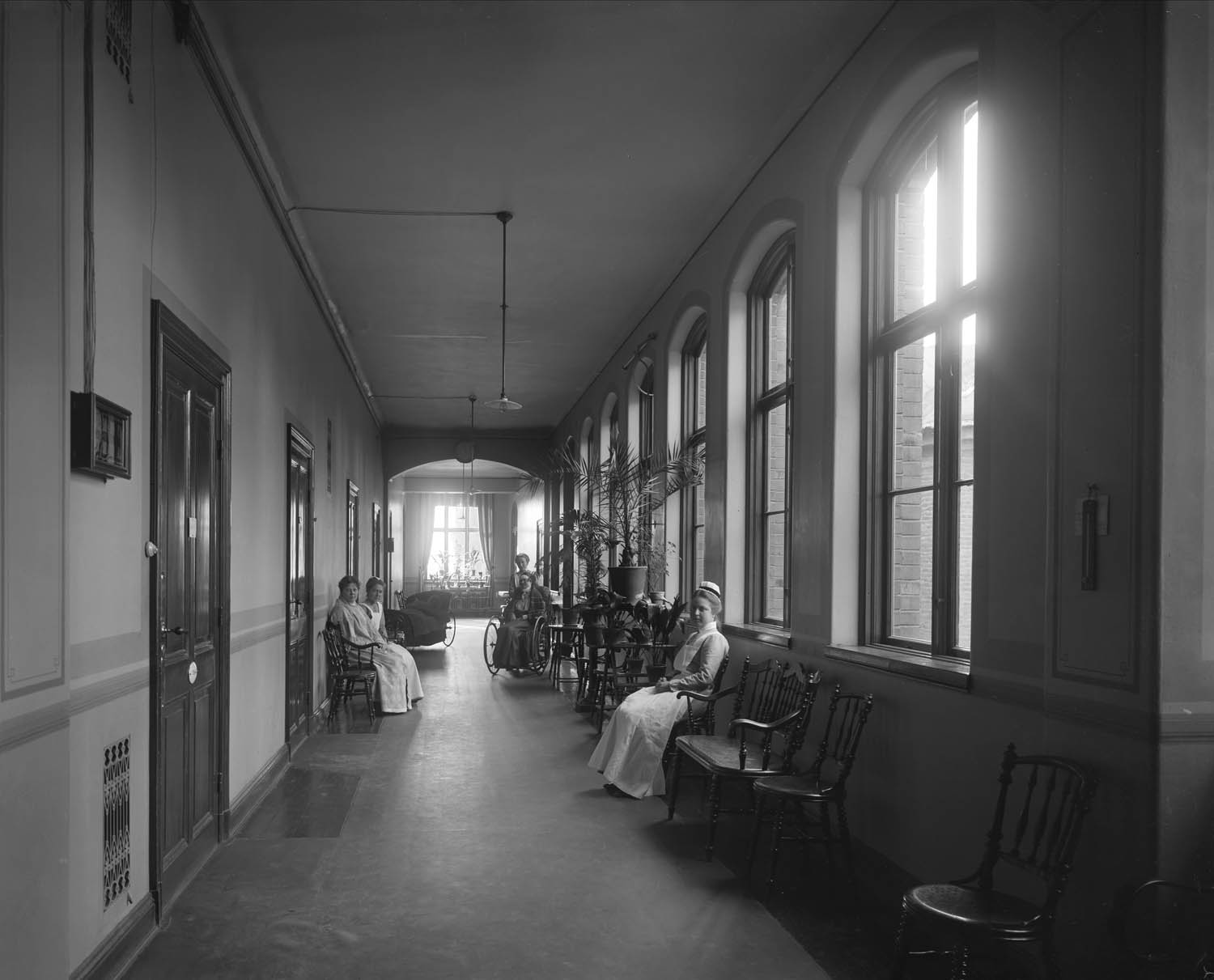
The corridor, circa 1889 or 1915.
