= Stockholm University College of Music Education =

Swedish university college

Coordinates: 59.33993°N 18.06889°E

Stockholm University College of Music Education (Swedish: Stockholms musikpedagogiska institut, SMI) is a Swedish university college in Stockholm which offers higher education in the field of music pedagogy in communal arts and culture schools as well as voice and speech pedagogy (logonomy).

SMI is situated at Campus Flemingsberg in Huddinge municipality, together with Södertörn University, Karolinska Institute Huddinge, Red Cross University College of Nursing and the Royal Institute of Technology.
