= Swedish Board of Student Finance (CSN) =

Swedish government authority

- Centrala studiestödsnämnden (CSN)

Agency overview
- Jurisdiction: Government of Sweden
- Headquarters: Norra Tjärngatan 2, 852 31 Sundsvall; 62.391729°N 17.295772°E
- Agency executive: Christina Forsberg, Director general
- Parent agency: Ministry of Education and Research
- Website: www.csn.se

The Swedish Board of Student Finance (Swedish: Centrala studiestödsnämnden, CSN) is a Swedish government agency under the Ministry of Education and Research. It is responsible for the administration of all matters related to student aid in Sweden. Its headquarter are located in Sundsvall.

== See also ==
- Education in Sweden
- List of universities in Sweden
- Swedish National Agency for Higher Education
- Swedish National Agency for Services to Universities
- Swedish National board of Appeal for Higher Education
