= European Agency for Special Needs and Inclusive Education =

The European Agency for Special Needs and Inclusive Education (EASNIE) is an organisation that works to help countries across Europe improve their inclusive policy and practice in inclusive education. It was established in 1996 and is based in Odense, Denmark with an office in Brussels, Belgium.

== Members ==
EASNIE has 32 member countries, covering 37 jurisdictions: Austria, Belgium (Flemish, French and German communities), Bulgaria, Croatia, Cyprus, Czech Republic, Denmark, Estonia, Finland, France, Germany, Greece, Hungary, Iceland, Ireland, Italy, Latvia, Lithuania, Luxembourg, Malta, Netherlands, North Macedonia, Norway, Poland, Portugal, Serbia, Slovakia, Slovenia, Spain, Sweden, Switzerland, United Kingdom (England, Northern Ireland, Scotland and Wales).

Membership is not limited to European Union countries.

== History ==
Initially named the ‘European Agency for Development in Special Needs Education’, EASNIE was founded with 15 member countries. It was established at the end of the European Commission’s Helios II programme in April 1996 and aimed to provide a permanent framework for European collaboration in special needs and inclusive education. In 1999, EASNIE opened a liaison office in Brussels to enhance its co-operation with European Union institutions.

In 2014, EASNIE adopted its current name, the European Agency for Special Needs and Inclusive Education, to better reflect its evolving focus. Its work has been referenced in various European Union documents, including the 2018 Recommendation on promoting common values and inclusive education, and the European dimension of teaching, the 2019 Recommendation on High-Quality Early Childhood Education and Care Systems and the 2021 Council Conclusions on Equity and Inclusion in Education and Training, which urged member states to 'make use of' EASNIE resources.

In 2021, EASNIE marked its 25th anniversary, and in 2024, announced the appointment of Dr João Costa as the new director from 1 January 2025, succeeding Dr Cor J. W. Meijer.

In 2026, EASNIE marked its 30th anniversary with a high-level event in Brussels, introducing the Ten Pillars Shaping the Future of Inclusive Education, a framework presenting ten priorities for the development of inclusive, equitable and participatory education systems. As part of the anniversary programme, it also launched Inclusion Talks, a webinar series on key themes of inclusive education.

== Activities ==
EASNIE focuses on ensuring the right to inclusive and equitable educational opportunities for every learner, particularly those who are vulnerable to exclusion and segregation, including learners traditionally referred to as having special educational needs or disabilities. EASNIE conducts activities, provides policy guidance and recommendations to assist member countries in implementing inclusive education practices, in collaboration with international organisations such as the OECD and UNESCO.

EASNIE work encompasses areas such as early childhood intervention, assessment in inclusive settings, vocational training and teacher education. It also addresses the role of ICT in education, information accessibility and data collection, providing opportunities for sharing different types of knowledge and experiences in the area of inclusive education. It operates under annual and multi-annual work programmes that are developed in consultation with its member countries and provide them with evidence-based information, tools and recommendations intended to aid in policy planning, review and implementation.

EASNIE activities are financed by the ministries of education in its member countries and by the European Commission via the EU Erasmus+ education programme.
