= Student financial aid in Sweden =

Assistance for paying for education in Sweden

Student financial aid in Sweden consists of grants and loans administered by the Swedish National Board of Student Aid, a Swedish government agency. Students living with their parents often only take the student grant, while other students tend to take both the student grant and the student loan. The loans and grants are normally approved for a maximum of 12 semesters, or 240 weeks. In 2024, weekly student aid for a full-time student was as follows:

	Amount in kronor
Grant	997
Loan	2,292
Total	3,289

In 2018, the interest rates for tuition fees were low at 0.13, with the average debt equivalent to $21,000, even though students borrow only for living expenses, as Swedish universities charge no tuition fees.

No income tax is paid on student grants and student loans.

Students must meet basic requirements to receive financial aid.

- Must meet the age requirements. May receive student aid until the year that they turn 56, but the right to take out a loan will be limited from the year that they turn 47. For upper secondary education, there is also a minimum age of 20.
- Must be attending a school or course that qualifies them for student aid.
- Must be studying at least half-time.
- Must study for at least three weeks.

In Sweden, application and tuition fees apply for students who are not citizens of the EU, the EEA, a Nordic country, or Switzerland and who apply for or enroll on studies at the bachelor’s or master’s level.
