= School of Dance and Circus =

Swedish higher education institution

Coordinates: 59°20′30″N 18°06′41″E

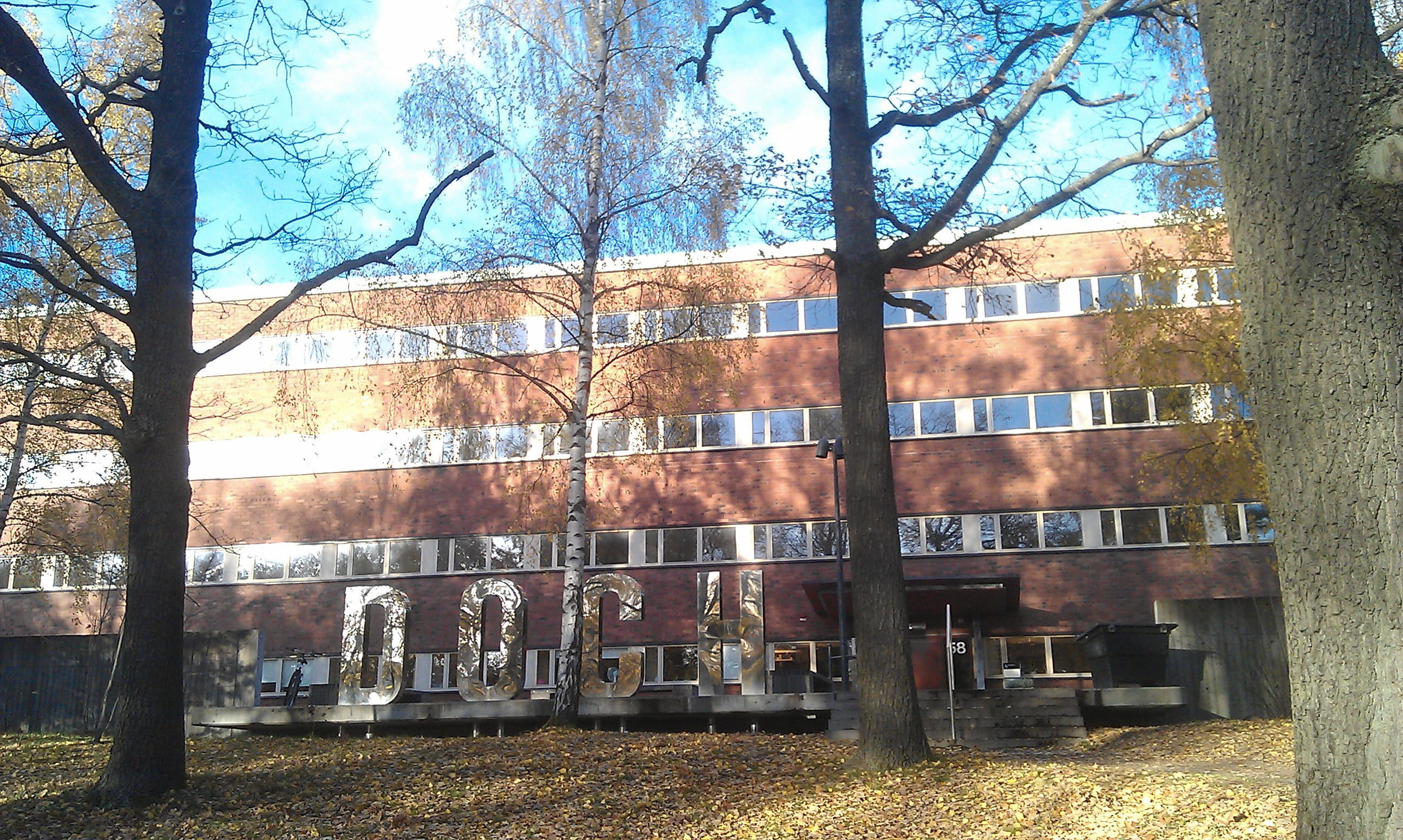
- Type: Public
- Established: 1963
- Location: Stockholm, Sweden
- Website: www.fedec.eu/en/members/2-the-department-of-circus-at-stockholm-university-of-the-arts-skh/

The School of Dance and Circus (Swedish: Dans- och cirkushögskolan, DOCH) was, until 2014, a Swedish institution offering higher education in the fields of dance education, folk dance, dance, dance therapy, historical dance, choreography and contemporary circus. Since 1 January 2014 it has been a part of Stockholm University of the Arts, and the previous name is no longer used. DOCH was founded as the Institute of Choreography (Koreografiska institutet) in 1963; in 1978 it was renamed the University College of Dance, “Danshögskolan”; in 2010 it became the University of Dance and Circus, "Dans och Cirkushögskolan" (DOCH). It operated under the Ministry of Education, and was fully funded by the government and therefore had no tuition fees for Swedish and EU citizens.

== Circus programme ==
Attendance at the circus school was awarded on the basis of live auditions held in Stockholm, with tests of physical strength, flexibility, endurance, and theatrical skill. In addition, each applicant was required to give a demonstration of their own performance specialty.

The program, headed by Ivar Heckscher, trained students in acrobatics, equilibristics, aerial technique, and juggling. In addition, each student received advanced training in at least one discipline. The neocircus program included theoretical studies to complement each student's personal artistic development.

Until 2007, no Americans had ever been accepted into the neocircus program. In June 2007, American juggler Wes Peden became one of 16 students chosen from 68 candidates, who were culled from 200 applicants.

== Vice-chancellors ==
- 2006–2013 Efva Lilja
- 1996–2005 Kari Sylwan
- 1976–1996 Lena Malmsjö
- 1971–1976 Lilian Runestam
- 1963–1971 Bengt Häger
- 1963 Birgit Cullberg
