= Natural Science Programme =

Swedish educational program

The Natural Science Programme (Swedish: Naturvetenskapsprogrammet), often abbreviated as NA, NV, and NP, is one of the national upper secondary school (gymnasieskola) programs in Sweden. It is a higher education-preparatory program designed for students wishing to pursue careers in science, technology, mathematics, and medicine.

In 2023/24, the programme had 15,400 first-hand applicants.

== See also ==
- Education in Sweden
