= Education in Sweden =

Ministry of Education and Research

National education budget (2026)
- Budget: 105 billion SEK

General details
- System type: National
- Primary: 1,049,490 students
- Secondary: 347,900 students

Attainment
- Secondary diploma: 89.0% of adults (OECD 2025)
- Post-secondary diploma: 50.8% of adults (OECD 2025)

Education in Sweden is mandatory for children between ages 5/6 and 15/16 depending on the time of year they were born. The school year in Sweden runs from mid-late August to early/mid-June. The Christmas holiday from mid-December to early January divides the Swedish school year into two terms.

Preschool is free for all families. The year children turn six they start the compulsory preschool class (förskoleklass), which acts as a transition phase between preschool and comprehensive schools. Children between ages 5/6 and 15/16 attend comprehensive school where a wide range of subjects are studied. All students study the same subjects, with exception for different language choices. The majority of schools are run municipally, but there are also privately owned schools, known as independent schools.

Almost all students continue studying in three-year-long upper secondary schools where most students choose one out of 18 national programmes, some of which are vocational and some preparatory. For students not fulfilling the requirements for the national programmes, introductory programmes are available where students work to satisfy the requirements for the national programmes. In 2018, 16% of students finishing year 9 of comprehensive school were not eligible for national programmes.

The higher education system is compatible with the rest of Europe through the Bologna Process where degrees are divided into three cycles: basic level, advanced level and doctoral level. There are two degrees available in each cycle of different lengths. Universities have no tuition fees for Swedish citizens (as well for citizens of European Economic Area countries), and student aid is available from the government.

== Classification ==
Education in Sweden
Type of education	School		Designation		Age
Postgraduate education Doctoral level	University (Universitet); 2–5 years	Research entitled university college (Högskola med forskningstillstånd); 2–5 years	4th year		Ages vary
Postgraduate education Doctoral level	University (Universitet); 2–5 years	Research entitled university college (Högskola med forskningstillstånd); 2–5 years	3rd year		Ages vary
Postgraduate education Doctoral level	University (Universitet); 2–5 years	Research entitled university college (Högskola med forskningstillstånd); 2–5 years	2nd year		Ages vary
Postgraduate education Doctoral level	University (Universitet); 2–5 years	Research entitled university college (Högskola med forskningstillstånd); 2–5 years	1st year		Ages vary
Master's level education	University (Universitet); 1–2 years	University college (Högskola); 1–2 years	2nd year		Ages vary
Master's level education	University (Universitet); 1–2 years	University college (Högskola); 1–2 years	1st year		Ages vary
Bachelor's level education	University (Universitet); 2–3 years	University college (Högskola); 2–3 years	3rd year		Ages vary
Bachelor's level education	University (Universitet); 2–3 years	University college (Högskola); 2–3 years	2nd year		Ages vary
Bachelor's level education	University (Universitet); 2–3 years	University college (Högskola); 2–3 years	1st year		Ages vary
Upper secondary education	Gymnasium/High School (Gymnasieskola)		Tredje ring	3rd year	18–19
Upper secondary education	Gymnasium/High School (Gymnasieskola)		Andra ring	2nd year	17–18
Upper secondary education	Gymnasium/High School (Gymnasieskola)		Första ring	1st year	16–17
Primary education	Compulsory school (Grundskola)		Upper stage Högstadiet	9th year	15–16
Primary education	Compulsory school (Grundskola)		Upper stage Högstadiet	8th year	14–15
Primary education	Compulsory school (Grundskola)		Upper stage Högstadiet	7th year	13–14
Primary education	Compulsory school (Grundskola)		Middle stage Mellanstadiet	6th year	12–13
Primary education	Compulsory school (Grundskola)		Middle stage Mellanstadiet	5th year	11–12
Primary education	Compulsory school (Grundskola)		Middle stage Mellanstadiet	4th year	10–11
Primary education	Compulsory school (Grundskola)		Lower stage Lågstadiet	3rd year	9–10
Primary education	Compulsory school (Grundskola)		Lower stage Lågstadiet	2nd year	8–9
Primary education	Compulsory school (Grundskola)		Lower stage Lågstadiet	1st year	7–8
Preschool class education	Preschool class (Förskoleklass)		Preschool class Förskoleklass		6–7
Preschool education	Preschool (Förskola)				1–6

== History ==
According to Lars Petterson, the number of students grew slowly, 1900–1947, then shot up rapidly in the 1950s, and declined after 1962. The pattern of birth rates was a major factor. In addition Petterson points to the opening up of the gymnasium from a limited upper social base to the general population based on talent. In addition he points to the role of central economic planning, the widespread emphasis on education as a producer of economic growth and the expansion of white collar jobs. During the nineteenth century, as demand for education increased, more women entered the teaching force in many Western countries, including Sweden. By 1900, 66 percent of Sweden's teachers were women, many of whom worked in isolated rural areas.

=== Primary school ===
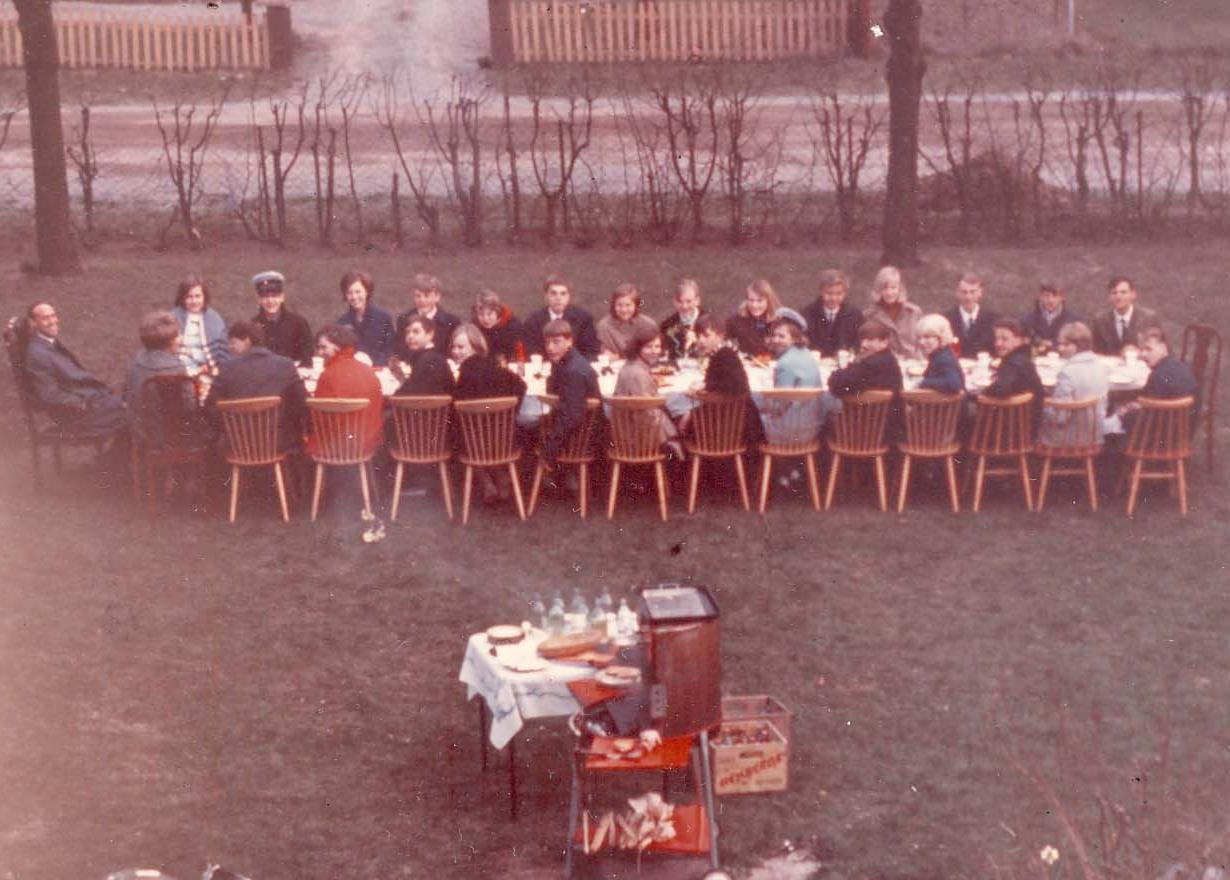
Class of 15- and 16-year-olds celebrates a successfully completed Realexamen (graduation from realskolan) in a Stockholm suburb in 1965.

In 1842, the Swedish parliament enacted the first national school act for primary schooling. While it did not make schooling compulsory for children, it made it mandatory for parishes to establish at least one primary school (folkskola). These primary school provided a basic education, focusing on reading, writing, math and religious knowledge. During the latter half of the nineteenth century, an increasing number of children attended these schools, and by the turn of the century most children attended these schools. The amount and content of teaching remained varied, but with the national curriculum of 1919 (1919 års undervisningsplan) a stricter national framework was enacted. The folkskola remained the basis for the Swedish educational system until the introduction of the 9-year comprehensive school in 1962.

The 1962 curriculum included two different study paths, vocational and preparatory; this was however abolished in the 1969 revision. In 1980 came another major revision increasing the emphasis on theoretical subjects. In 1994 the grading system was changed and in the latest revision from 2011 the grading system was changed yet again, this time also introducing grades from year 6.

=== Secondary school ===
In 1905 realskolan was introduced for students wanting to continue studying after folkskolan. It had varying length between three and six years.

In 1968 gymnasieskolan was introduced with a similar structure to the current version. There were 22 different programmes, some of which were vocational and some preparatory. These programmes lasted between two and four years, something that was changed in 1991, making all programmes three years long.

== Preschool ==
Preschool is offered to all children whose parents are working, studying, unemployed or on parental leave from the age of one. From the age of three, all children are eligible for at least three hours of preschool education every day for free. Fees for children being at preschool for more than three hours a day or under three years of age are based on family income and number of children. Prices range from free to a maximum of 1 425 SEK (€135 or US$150) per month as of July 2019 with exact rates set by the municipality.

It is intended to free up parents to work, establishing a foundation for children going into comprehensive schooling and promote fundamental values such as the equal value of all people. This is achieved through pedagogical activities prepared by preschool teachers often involving things such as play, singing and drawing. The preschool teachers should incorporate multiple educational moments each day.

== Comprehensive school ==
The educational system in Sweden is based on a nine-year long comprehensive school (grundskola), with mandatory attendance between six–seven and fifteen–sixteen years of age.

=== Subjects ===
In the Swedish compulsory school each student takes 17 compulsory subjects which are, sorted by time allocated: Swedish, mathematics, physical education, English, handicrafts, music, visual arts, technology, physics, chemistry, biology, history, social studies, religion, geography and home economics. All of these subjects are taken in all three school stages, lower stage (years 1–3), middle stage (years 4–6), and upper stage (years 7–9).

In the sixth year students can also choose a non-compulsory foreign language course. Over 85% of year 9 students studied a third language in 2017. All schools have to offer the three languages Spanish, French, and German. Many schools also offer additional help in the core subjects English and Swedish instead of the language course. Taking the language course can improve the students' final grade significantly and can be required for some more competitive upper secondary schools.

There is also a compulsory, non-graded student's choice subject (elevens val) where the student can choose from various activities facilitated by the school. Students' choice has been criticized for potentially being a bad use of the students' and teachers' time.

=== Grading ===
In Sweden students start receiving grades from year 6 with proposals of changing it to year 4. Before year 6 students receive an Individual Development Plan (Individuell Utvecklingsplan, IUP) containing the teachers' assessment of the students' knowledge. Students have regular development talks with their teachers discussing how to improve based on their IUP and grades.

The grading system in compulsory school uses the grades A, B, C, D, and E as passing grades and F as failing. B and D work as filling grades, for when a student has not reached all objectives for C or A but has reached most of them. If the student cannot be graded, e.g. due to extensive truancy, the student will receive a dash instead of an F. A dash is not considered a grade. If a student is on the verge of receiving an F in a certain subject or course, the teacher responsible for that subject will notify the student and the student's parents. If a student is given an F, they will receive a written review of how to improve themselves.

The pupil's total score, which is used for application to upper secondary schools, is calculated by taking the pupil's subject grades and numerically adding them together, with the following letter to number conversion: E = 10, D = 12.5, C = 15, B = 17.5, and A = 20. This yields a maximum possible score of 340 for students taking 17 subjects. Pupils can have either 16 or 17 grades depending on if they take an additional language course on top of the 16 compulsory subjects. Pupils who do not study a foreign language or instead study extra Swedish or English will only have 16 grades and cannot receive a score higher than 320.

The sixteen subjects used to calculate the total must include the three core subjects – English, Swedish, and mathematics. If the pupil fails any of the core subjects, they lack qualification to attend secondary school. However, the student can still attend the secondary school introduction program (introduktionsprogram), either to gain competence in the core subjects and start a secondary school programme or gain skills to enter employment.

=== National tests ===
In years 3, 6 and 9 national tests are administered to all students in the Swedish grundskola. The primary aim of these tests are to ensure all students are assessed equivalently. The test results should be given consideration by teachers when setting students' final grades.

In year 3 the tests are framed around a story involving two children encountering mathematics and Swedish in everyday situations to make the test situation less intimidating. Only Swedish and mathematics have national tests in year 3. The results from the tests are not used for grading, as students do not receive grades before year 6.

In year 6 and 9 there are tests for all three core subjects, Swedish, mathematics and English. These tests consist of both oral and written components. In year 9 one science subject (physics, biology or chemistry) and one social science subject (civics, religion, geography or history) are tested as well.

The National Agency for Education also provide tests similar to the national tests for the purpose of assisting teachers with assessing students. These are sometimes confused for national tests; however, these tests are not mandatory and available for a greater variety of year levels and subjects.

The tests and mark schemes have been spread on the internet before the test date several times, resulting in widespread cheating. In these cases, substitute tests are to be used; however, these tests have been accused of not giving results consistent with the non-substitute tests by the Swedish Teachers' Union and cannot be used in Statistics Sweden's reports. The Swedish National Audit Office published a report regarding "the unauthorised dissemination of national tests" in 2018. The audit found the Swedish National Agency for Education's new guidelines for handling the national tests satisfactory, but implemented too late. The report recommended the Swedish School Inspectorate to monitor individual schools' compliance with these new guidelines.

=== Violence guidelines ===
In 2014, the National Agency for Education published guidelines to staff on how to act during incidents of armed violence. In the 2012–2017 period, the number of reports of physical violence in schools increased 129% and reports of threats increased by 46% in the same period according to the Swedish Work Environment Authority. The latter reports include all reported physical violence and threats, not only armed violence.

=== Other types of primary education ===
There are various types of primary education including Sámi schools, with special accommodations for the indigenous Sámi people, special education schools for students with intellectual disabilities, and special schools for students with other disabilities such as deafness.

There is also komvux, adult education at the primary or secondary level, and introductory programmes for students who have failed compulsory education. Homeschooling is only permitted for students who for some reason, usually severe sickness, cannot participate in normal classroom education.

== Upper secondary education ==
Upper secondary school, called gymnasieskola, usually lasts for three years. It is elective, but with a 99% enrollment rate. It is divided into 18 different national programmes with different educational focus. The system is course-based with the same courses being used for multiple programmes. There are also introductory programmes for students who do not satisfy the requirements for the national programmes. A significant number of these students are immigrants learning Swedish.

=== National programmes ===
The national programmes are divided into two categories: preparatory and vocational. All national programmes give basic qualification to attend university, but preparatory programs typically also satisfy the additional requirements needed to study university courses in specific subject areas.

In the 2024-2025 school year approximately one-third of students studying a national programme were studying a vocational programme, while two-thirds were studying a preparatory programme.

List of national programmes (2024-2025)
English name	Swedish name	Type	Number of students
Social Science Programme	Samhällsvetenskapsprogrammet	Preparatory	65,523
Business Management and Economics Programme	Ekonomiprogrammet	Preparatory	62,603
Natural Science Programme	Naturvetenskapsprogrammet	Preparatory	43,451
Technology Programme	Teknikprogrammet	Preparatory	27,506
Arts Programme	Estetiska programmet	Preparatory	19,825
Electricity and Energy Programme	El- och energiprogrammet	Vocational	16,566
Vehicle and Transport Programme	Fordons- och transportprogrammet	Vocational	13,491
Building and Construction Programme	Bygg- och anläggningsprogrammet	Vocational	13,358
Sales and Service Programme	Försäljnings- och serviceprogrammet	Vocational	11,416
Child and Recreation Programme	Barn- och fritidsprogrammet	Vocational	11,255
Natural Resource Use Programme	Naturbruksprogrammet	Vocational	10,993
Health and Social Care Programme	Vård- och omsorgsprogrammet	Vocational	9,199
Handicraft Programme	Hantverksprogrammet	Vocational	6,866
Restaurant Management and Food Programme	Restaurang- och livsmedelsprogrammet	Vocational	5,010
Industrial Technology Programme	Industritekniska programmet	Vocational	4,944
HVAC and Property Maintenance Programme	VVS- och fastighetsprogrammet	Vocational	3,465
International Baccalaureate	International Baccalaureate	Preparatory	3,091
Hotel and Tourism Programme	Hotell- och turismprogrammet	Vocational	3,068
Humanities Programme	Humanistiska programmet	Preparatory	1,738

=== Courses ===
All students take at least 2500 points worth of courses. Some of these courses are universal for students in all programmes. These courses are the Level 1 courses in each of the following subjects: English, Swedish, mathematics, religion, civics, natural science and physical education. In preparatory programmes additional English, Swedish and mathematics are also included as core courses.

There are also programme-specific and orientation-specific courses. Orientation-specific courses are the courses that a student elects to take by selecting an orientation within their programme. Finally, individually selected courses are courses that the student freely selects for themselves.

=== Diploma project ===
In all programs in upper secondary school, all students are required to do a diploma project. The diploma project is a project where the students are required to plan, execute and reflect on a bigger project related to something they have been studying. This project has two grading options, which is receiving an E (pass) or F (fail). The diploma project is not included in the students' merit value that is used towards further education.

=== Eligibility ===
To be eligible for upper secondary education, the pupil needs to pass 8 of the subjects for the vocational programmes and 12 for preparatory programmes. Of those 8 or 12, 3 must be the subjects mathematics, Swedish and English. For the social science programme, the subjects of geography, social studies, history, and religion must be included among the 12 passed subjects. For the natural science programme, the natural science subjects must be included.

In 2018, 15.6% of pupils who left compulsory education did not qualify to proceed to upper secondary education. This is a significant increase from 2011, the first year with the current syllabus, where 12.3% of pupils did not qualify. The group not mastering compulsory education is predominantly boys and pupils with foreign origin.

Pupils who did not qualify for upper secondary education can still proceed to an introductory programme (Introduktionsprogram) which helps students gain eligibility for the national programmes.

=== Admittance ===
The prospective student applies to attend a certain program at a certain school, competing for entrance based upon his or her elementary school grades. In a few cases, such as the arts program (Estetiska programmet) at certain schools, the student applies for both the program and the orientation. Some programmes, generally the arts programmes and certain more specialized programmes or orientations, have some form of entrance exam in addition to the elementary school grades.

=== Introductory programmes ===
Introductory programmes are for students who did not qualify for the national programmes, most often by failing Swedish, English or mathematics. There are different types of introductory programmes, the most common of which being language introduction for immigrants learning Swedish and individual alternative, a highly individualized programme intended to help students who did not satisfy the eligibility requirements for the national programmes gain eligibility.

== Higher education ==
After upper secondary school, students can apply to university in order to receive tertiary education. General academic degrees are offered by public universities and university colleges that tend to attract students on a regional basis. Besides general academic degrees, the higher education system also provides a number of professional degrees at a bachelor's or master's level in fields such as engineering, law and medicine. Independently from the Bologna Process-compatible university system, there is a system of higher vocational education where subject areas such as business finance and administration, IT, and hospitality and tourism are taught.

=== Types of degrees ===
Swedish degrees are incorporated in the Bologna Process, the European higher education framework. In this system degrees are divided into three cycles, corresponding to bachelor's level, master's level and doctoral level. In Sweden, there are two general qualifications for each cycle of different lengths and various professional degrees and various professional degrees at bachelor's or master's level.

==== Diagram ====
Higher Education from 1 July 2007
Type of education	Level	Degree			Designation
Postgraduate education	Doctoral level/ Third cycle	Degree of Doctor (PhD); Doktorsexamen 240 higher education credits			4th year
Postgraduate education	Doctoral level/ Third cycle	Degree of Doctor (PhD); Doktorsexamen 240 higher education credits			3rd year
Postgraduate education	Doctoral level/ Third cycle	Degree of Licentiate; Licentiatexamen 120 higher education credits			2nd year
Postgraduate education	Doctoral level/ Third cycle	Degree of Licentiate; Licentiatexamen 120 higher education credits			1st year
Undergraduate education	Master's level/ Second cycle		Degree of Master (Two years); Masterexamen 120 higher education credits	Professional Degrees; Yrkesexamina (3–5 years long)	5th year
Undergraduate education	Master's level/ Second cycle	Degree of Master (One year); Magisterexamen 60 higher education credits	Degree of Master (Two years); Masterexamen 120 higher education credits	Professional Degrees; Yrkesexamina (3–5 years long)	4th year
Undergraduate education	Bachelor's level/ First cycle		Degree of Bachelor; Kandidatexamen 180 higher education credits	Professional Degrees; Yrkesexamina (3–5 years long)	3rd year
Undergraduate education	Bachelor's level/ First cycle	Higher Education Diploma; Högskoleexamen 120 higher education credits	Degree of Bachelor; Kandidatexamen 180 higher education credits	Professional Degrees; Yrkesexamina (3–5 years long)	2nd year
Undergraduate education	Bachelor's level/ First cycle	Higher Education Diploma; Högskoleexamen 120 higher education credits	Degree of Bachelor; Kandidatexamen 180 higher education credits	Professional Degrees; Yrkesexamina (3–5 years long)	1st year

==== Basic level (grundnivå) ====
To be admitted to a programme at the basic level, a student must complete an education at the gymnasieskola level or its equivalent. The degrees that can be obtained at the basic level are:

- Higher Education Diploma (högskoleexamen), two years, 120 higher education credits
- Degree of Bachelor (kandidatexamen), three years, 180 higher education credits

==== Advanced level (avancerad nivå) ====
To be admitted to a programme at the advanced level, a student must have obtained a three-year Swedish degree at the basic level or a corresponding degree from another country or some corresponding qualification. The degrees that can be obtained at the advanced level are:

- Degree of Master (one year) (magisterexamen), one year, 60 higher education credits
- Degree of Master (two years) (masterexamen), two years, 120 higher education credits

Both degrees require completing a thesis.

The Degree of Master (two years) is a new degree that is intended to be closely linked to continuing education at the graduate level.

==== Doctoral level (forskarnivå) ====
To be admitted to a programme at the doctoral level, a student must have obtained a Swedish degree at the advanced level or completed at least four years of full-time study with at least one year at the advanced level or a corresponding degree from another country or equivalent knowledge. The degrees that can be obtained at the doctoral level are:

- Degree of Licentiate (licentiatexamen), two years, 120 higher education credits
- Degree of Doctor (PhD, doktorsexamen), four years, 240 higher education credits

Postgraduate academic titles are associate professor (docent) and professor.

=== Grading ===
The grading system used vary between different universities and university colleges. There are five different systems in use, all of which are criteria-referenced. The three most common systems are the seven-grade scale (A–F, Fx), the three-grade scale VG, G, U which is very similar to the pre-2011 compulsory and upper secondary grade system, and the pass or fail system G/U. The grades from all systems can be converted to the European Credit Transfer and Accumulation System (ECTS) for grade comparison with other universities across Europe.

=== International students ===
Universities in Sweden offer a large number of degrees taught in English. Applications to most bachelor’s and master’s are submitted through the national admissions portal, Universityadmissions.se and close on 15 January for the autumn semester.

International applicants to bachelor’s programmes are generally required to have completed upper secondary education equivalent to Swedish secondary school and to meet programme-specific entry requirements, including English-language proficiency. Applicants to master’s programmes must also hold a recognised bachelor’s degree.

For international applicants, the Test in Swedish for University Studies is used to test Swedish language proficiency. For studies in English, prior school or university education can be sufficient as a proof of English; otherwise, several tests such as IELTS and TOEFL are accepted.

=== SweSAT ===
The Swedish Scholastic Aptitude Test (Högskoleprovet) is a standardised test used as one of the means to gain admission to higher education in Sweden. The test itself is divided into a mathematical section and a verbal section, which both contain four subdivisions, for a total of 160 multiple-choice questions. Apart from the English language reading comprehension test, all sections are taken in Swedish. To gain admittance to courses or programmes using the SweSAT, students need to independently fulfill the eligibility requirements.

=== Student aid ===
Swedish students receive help from the National Board of Student Aid (CSN) while studying. CSN is a Swedish governmental authority which issues financial aid for studies. This includes loans and grants for students studying in Sweden or abroad.

Higher education is free of charge for Swedish, EU, EEA, and Swiss citizens. Meanwhile, fees for non-EU/EEA students typically range from approximately SEK 80,000 to SEK 200,000 per academic year, with master’s programmes in some subjects charging higher fees.

=== Anti discrimination work ===
All universities are required to have guidelines on how to handle cases of discrimination. They are also required to work together with the equality ombudsman to ensure admission, tuition and examinations are fair.

=== Higher vocational education ===
Post-secondary vocational education usually consists of many one- to two-year-long subject specific programmes consisting of roughly three quarters theoretical work and one quarter workplace experience. Higher vocational schools cooperate with various employers to improve the students' employment prospects. The system is independent from the other types of higher education in that it is not Bologna compatible, does not award a bachelor's or master's degree (while professional degrees do) and is not taught by universities or university colleges.

== Independent schools ==
Prior to the 1990s, there were only a handful of private schools in Sweden, mostly tuition-funded boarding schools, of which Sigtunaskolan and Lundsbergs skola are the most well known. A major education reform in 1992 allowed privately run schools offering primary or secondary education to receive public funding for each student at a level similar to what public schools receive. These are called independent schools or free schools (friskolor), and as of 2008 there were around 900 of them.

The independent schools, similar to charter schools in the United States or academies in the United Kingdom, are funded with public money (skolpeng) from the local municipality based on the number of pupils they have enrolled, in the same way Swedish public schools are. Consequently, they are not allowed to discriminate or require admission examinations, nor are they allowed to charge the students any additional fees. They are, however, allowed to accept private donations. Regional economic differences directly affect how much money each municipality can provide per pupil.

Anyone can start an independent for-profit school, or a chain of such schools, in Sweden. Many of them offer an alternate pedagogy (such as Montessori), or a foreign/international, religious or special needs (such as hearing-impaired) profile. There are also several secondary schools with an elite sports profile. Internationella Engelska Skolan and Kunskapsskolan are the two largest independent school chains. In 2008, more than 10% of Swedish pupils were enrolled independent schools.

In 2023, Minister for Schools Lotta Edholm launched an investigation into friskolor, after calling into question its profit-making model. In recent years there had been a drop in educational standards with inequality rising. 15% of primary pupils (up to 16-year-old) and 30% of all upper school pupils went to friskolor. One major issue was the claim that some friskolor awarded pupils grades that were too high, distorting the grading system.

=== Opinions ===
The independent school system has divided public opinion in Sweden, especially regarding religious schools and for-profit schools. During the 2018 election several parties, including the Moderate Party and Social Democratic Party, suggested some kind of profit limit, while the Liberals and Centre Party opposed such a limit. A ban on religious independent schools has also been suggested with support from the Left Party and Social Democratic Party, while the Moderates, Green Party, Christian Democrats and Centre party are satisfied with the current system banning religious elements in the classroom, but allowing them during breaks or before lessons start.

The Swedish model has been put forward as a possible model for similar solutions in both the United Kingdom and the United States, where Per Unckel, County Governor of Stockholm and former Conservative Minister of Education, in 2009 summarized the advantages of the Swedish system in an opinion piece produced by the Libertarian think tank Pacific Research Institute: "Education is so important that you can’t just leave it to one producer. Because we know from monopoly systems that they do not fulfill all wishes".

In February 2013, The Guardian published an article by a former political advisor to the Swedish Ministry of Education, Karin Svanborg-Sjövall, on the independent school system: "Sweden proves that private profit improves services and influences policy. Even education unions came on board when private provision was introduced into Swedish schools", citing the paper on average educational performance produced by research institute under the Swedish Ministry of Employment, IFAU, which found "that an increase in the share of independent-school students improves average performance at the end of compulsory school as well as long-run educational outcomes". However, in June 2015, another article by the education correspondent from The Guardian quoted then Education Minister, Gustav Fridolin, as saying that the system was "a political failure" and stated that standards in learning had dropped dramatically over the years and were in a state of "crisis".

== PISA and PIRLS results ==
Sweden came in first in the United Nations Children's Fund 2008 ranking of early childhood education.

Swedish results in the Programme for International Student Assessment (PISA) were in 2015 close to the OECD average. Swedish scores had declined between 2006 and 2012, which was heavily reported and adopted as an important talking point for many political parties, including the Alliance and the Social Democratic Party.

In the 2015 PISA report, Swedish scores increased for the first time since the programme started in 2006. Both the Moderate Party and the Social Democratic Party have suggested actions to improve education and increase PISA scores in the future.

Sweden’s performance in the international fourth-year reading assessments (Progress in International Reading Literacy Study, PIRLS) dropped by 19 points from 2001 (561) to 2011 (542) and recovered by 13 points in 2016 (555).

The influx of immigrants to Swedish schools has been reported as a major contributor to why Sweden's score dropped more than any other European country by a National Agency of Education report.

However, this does not account for the entirety of the drop in results. In the spring of 2021, the nationwide newspaper Expressen published a series of articles describing major flaws in the testing carried out by the National Agency for Education. A comparatively large number and range of students had, in violation of the intention of the tests, been exempted from testing, generating a result showing a positive trend. An investigation into how this could have happened despite several officials at the Ministry for Education having raised questions concerning the testing methods is taking place. Some MPs have called for the resignation of the Minister for Education, who in turn has directed the liability for testing towards the school authority.

== See also ==
- Education in Stockholm
- List of universities and colleges in Sweden
- Studentexamen
- Student financial aid in Sweden
- Swedish National Union of Students
- Open access in Sweden
