= Swedish Red Cross University =

Swedish university college

Coordinates: 59°13′19.7″N 17°56′18.8″E

- Röda Korsets Högskola
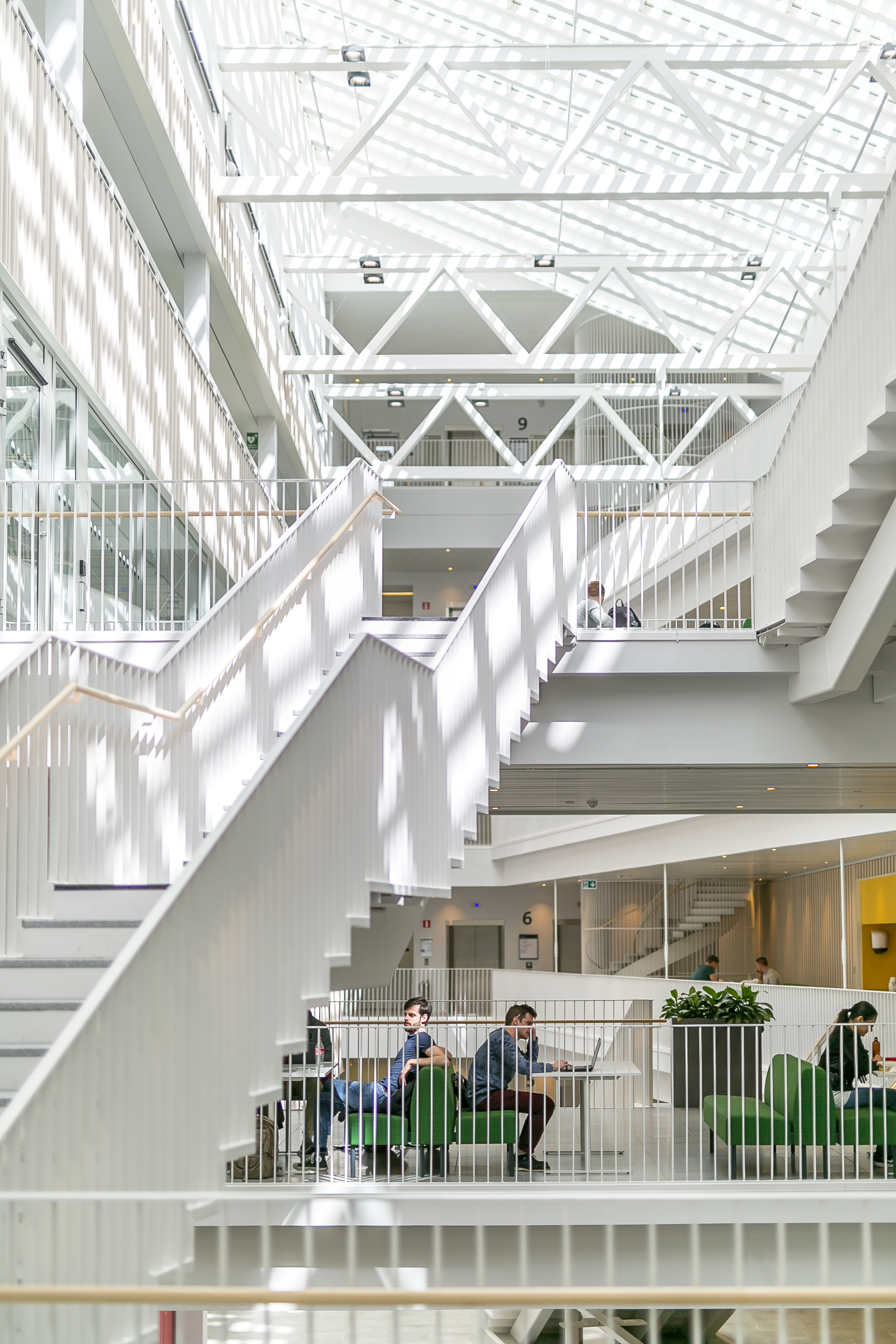
- Established: 1867
- Rector: Prof. Susanne Georgsson
- Academic staff: 70
- Students: 1000
- Location: Stockholm, Sweden
- Campus: Urban
- Website: www.rkh.se/en www.rkh.se

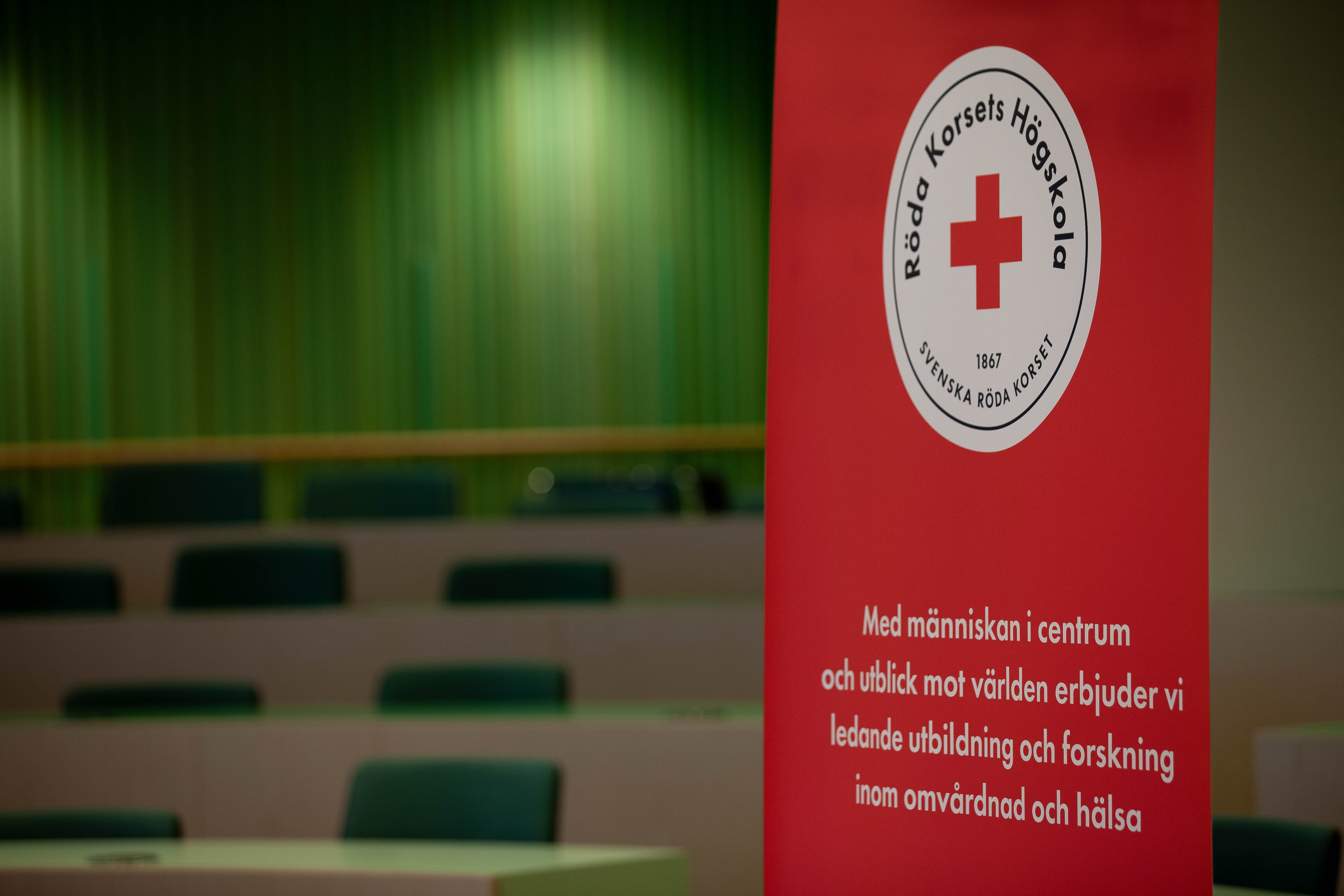
Swedish Red Cross University

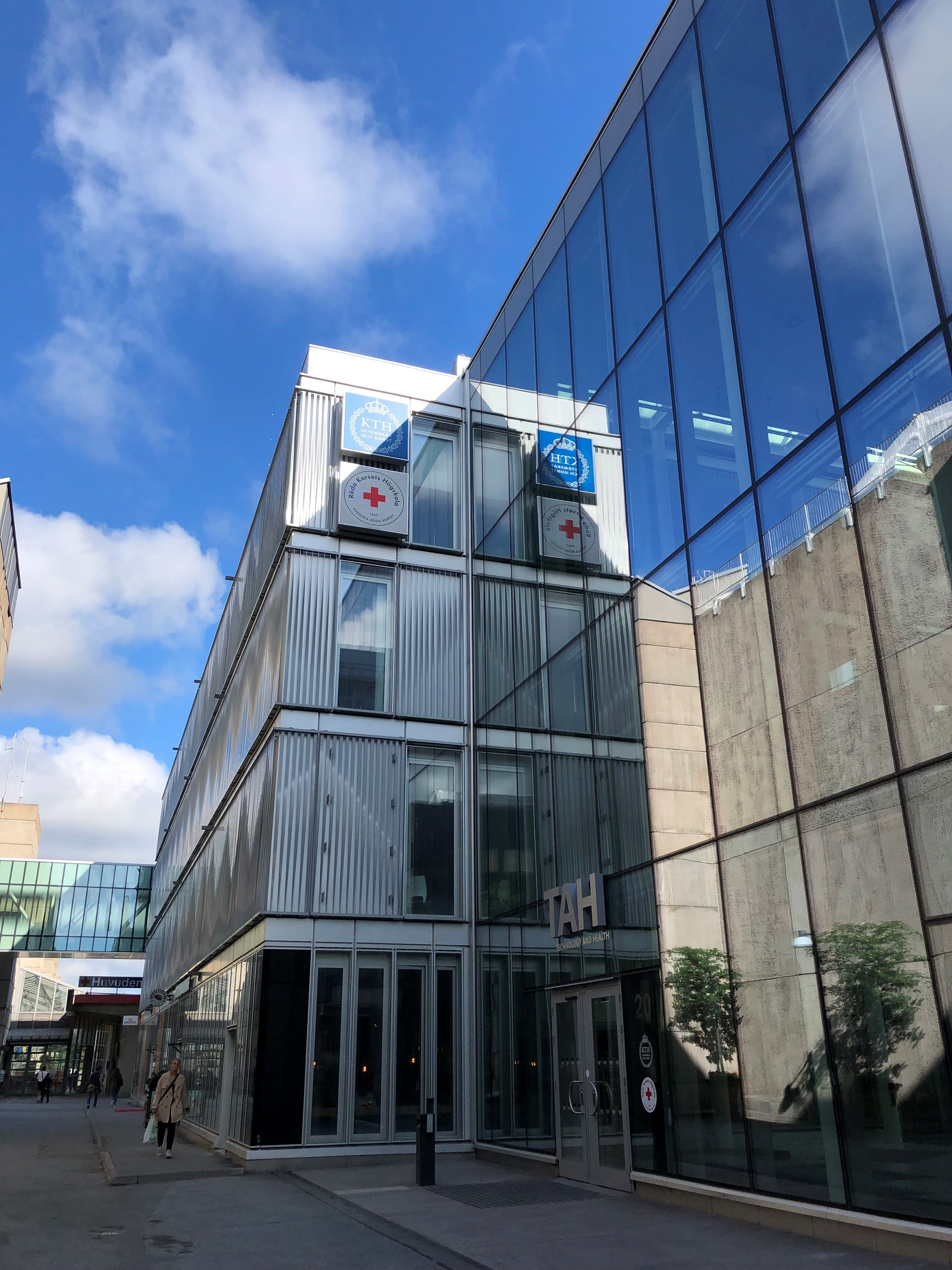
Swedish Red Cross University at Campus Flemingsberg in Stockholm

Swedish Red Cross University (Swedish: Röda Korsets Högskola) is a Swedish university operated with the Swedish Red Cross Home Foundation as its accountable authority. It is not to be confused with The Swedish Red Cross. In addition to a degree in nursing, the institution also offers university courses related to the subject of nursing.

The Swedish Red Cross School of Nursing was established in 1867 with Emmy Reppy as its first director. The Red Cross Home Foundation (Stiftelsen Rödakorshemmet) was formed in 1915 to provide training for nurses under the auspices of the Red Cross in Sweden, and follows the principles and values of the Red Cross. The Swedish Red Cross University (former Red Cross School of Nursing) is situated at Campus Flemingsberg in Stockholm since 2016.

== Degree ==
The Swedish Red Cross University offers a degree of Bachelor of Science in Nursing and degrees of Master of Science in intensive care, psychiatric care and infectious disease care. The programmes are run in Swedish but the University offers courses in English and an exchange student programme.
