= Sophiahemmet University College =

Swedish nursing school

- Sophiahemmet Högskola
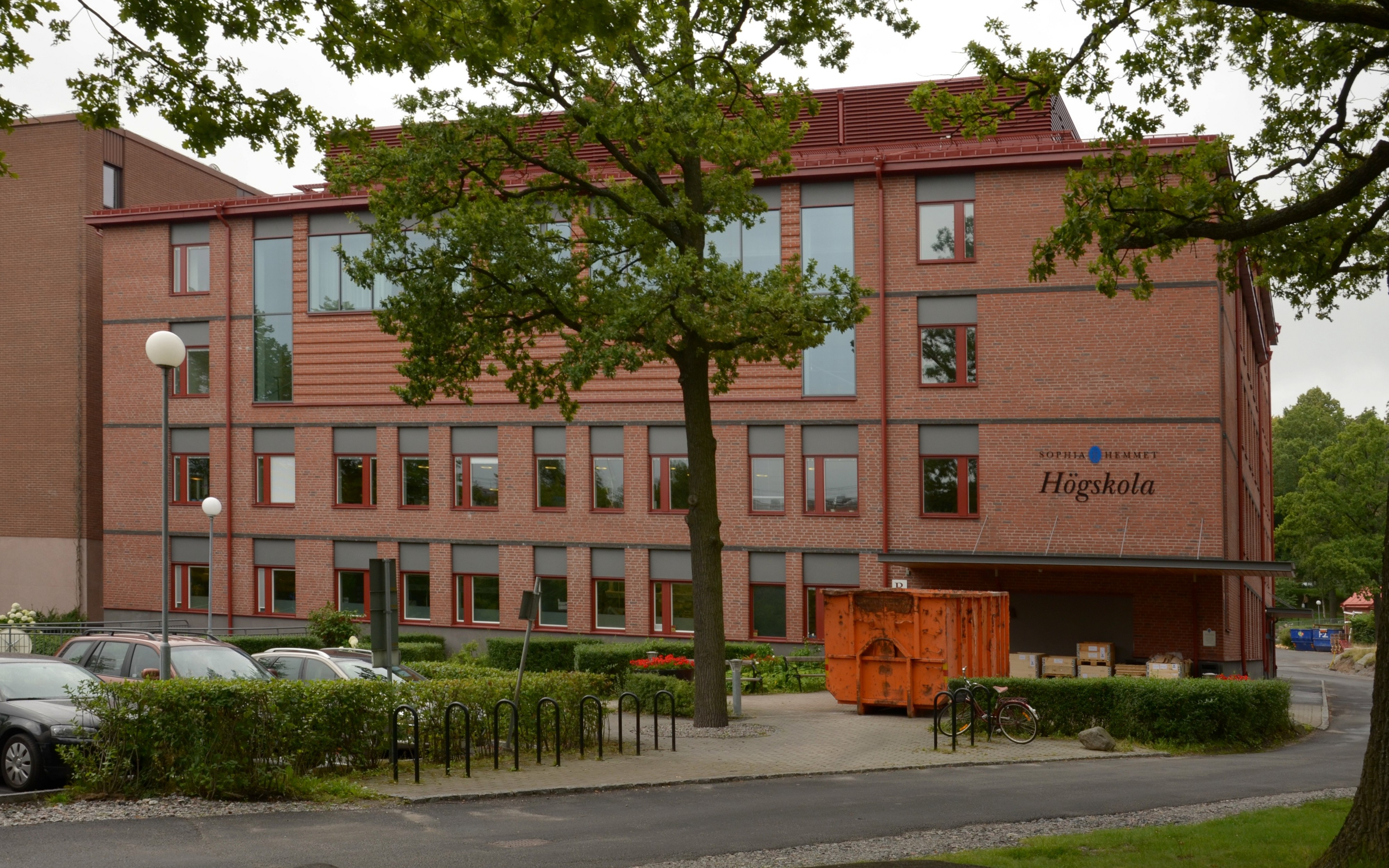
- Type: University
- Established: 1884; 142 years ago
- Founders: Queen Sophia
- Students: 1300
- Location: Sweden; 59°20′46″N 18°04′33″E
- Website: www.shh.se/en/

Sophiahemmet University (Swedish: Sophiahemmet Högskola) is a Swedish institution for higher education associated with Sophiahemmet. In addition to a degree in nursing, the institution also offers programmes at advanced level, such as Specialist Nursing programmes, as well as Bachelor, Master and Diploma programmes. Sophiahemmet Högskola has approximately 450 students enrolled in the three-year nursing programme and a total of approximately 1300 students on a yearly basis. Education is only offered in Swedish. Sophiahemmet University College was founded in 1884 (142 years ago) by Queen Sophia.
