= Swedish Scholastic Aptitude Test =

Higher education admission test in Sweden

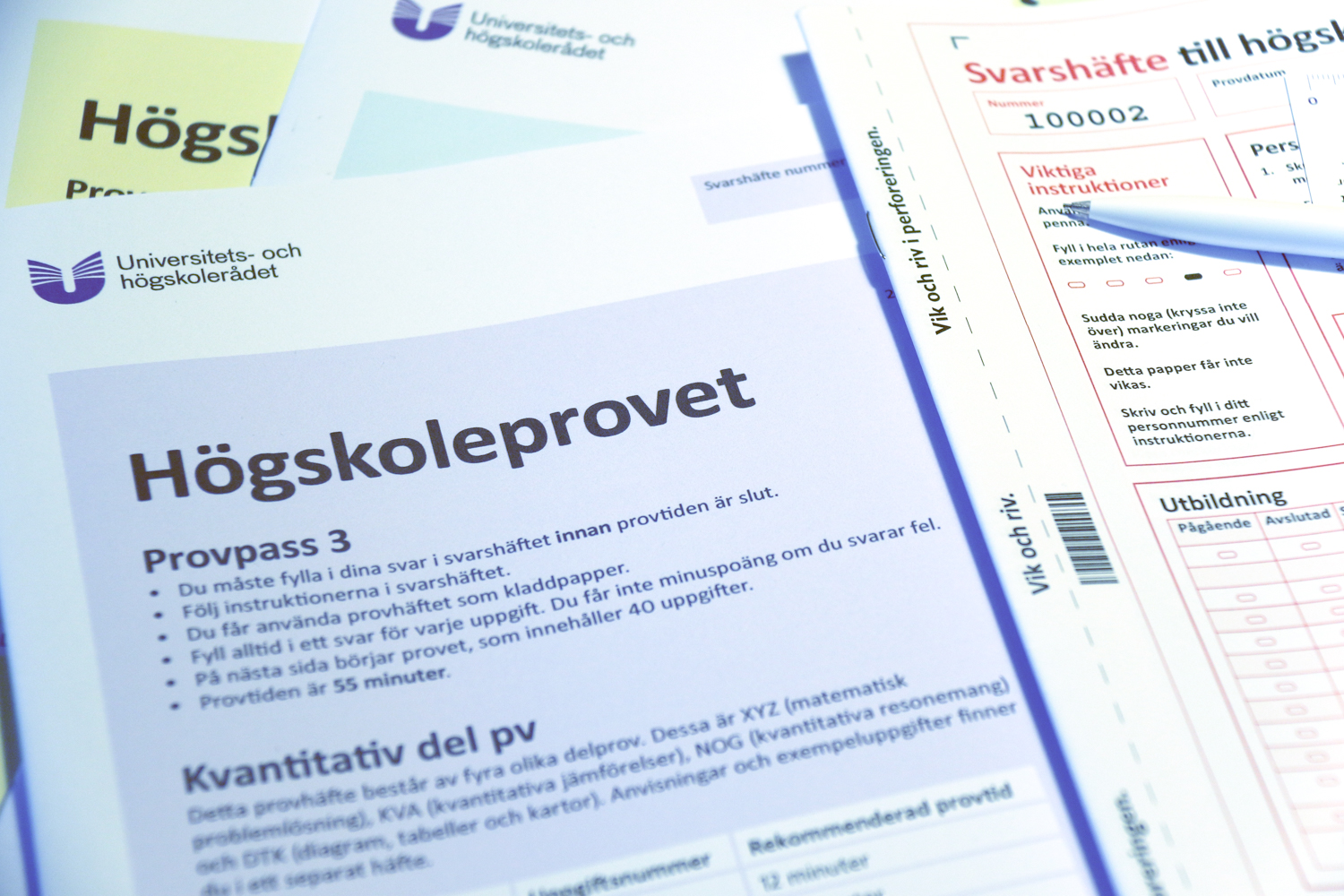
University entrance exam

The Swedish Scholastic Aptitude Test (SweSAT)(Swedish: högskoleprovet) is a standardised test used as one of the means to gain admission to higher education in Sweden. The test itself, which is administered by the Swedish Council for Higher Education, is divided into a mathematical part and a verbal part, which both respectively contain 4 subdivisions, in total 160 multiple-choice questions. All sections are taken in one day, a Saturday in April (Spring test) or a Sunday in October (Autumn test), lasting between 7½ and 8 hours including breaks between each section and a lunch break. Apart from the English language reading comprehension test, all sections are taken in Swedish.

== Evaluation and norming ==
The result on the test is normalised to a scale between 0.0 and 2.0, with 0.05 increments. About 0.1% of the test-takers are awarded 2.0, which is the highest grade. Usually, 145 to 150 marks (out of 160) are required for 2.0. The average normated score for the test is normally around 0.87, and the standard deviation is about 0.40, resulting in approximately two thirds of the test takers receiving a result in the interval 0.50–1.30, and 95% receiving a result between 0.20 and 1.70.

After each of the five tests, participants are given a brief moment to copy their answers onto an orange paper. Since autumn 2016, the correct answers to the test are posted on the Swedish Council for Higher Education's website, studera.nu, the following Wednesday from the day of the test, which always takes place on Saturday or Sunday.

Prior to autumn 2016, the answers to the test were posted the same day as the exam on studera.nu, the högskoleprovet website, as well as in the evening newspapers and the following day in morning newspapers. Solutions could also be found in SVT's text-TV.

The decision to postpone the release of the solutions was made in order to prevent strategic cheating that had been noticed during previous tests.

== The current test (since autumn 2011) ==
The test is since autumn 2011 divided into two parts - a quantitative and a verbal part of 80 questions each. The quantitative and the verbal parts are both divided into four sections each with different types of questions. The test has a total of 160 questions, divided into four subtests of 40 questions each. Two of the subtests contains questions from the quantitative part of the test. The other two subtests contains questions from the verbal part. A fifth subtest is also given in order to develop new questions for future tests, but the result from this subtest is not counted.

The test-takers are allowed to mark down their answers on an additional provided answer sheet, in addition to the sheet that they hand in to test supervisor after every subtest, and bring this with them after the test is completed. In this way they can compare their answers to the test key which is later published on the internet, teletext and newspapers. This only allows the test-takers to find out their raw score, as opposed to the normalised score which is used for university applications, but by comparing this results to the normalisation tables of prior tests an estimate can be made.

=== Quantitative part (40+40 questions) ===
1. XYZ – Mathematical problem-solving. This section examines the ability to solve mathematical problems in the areas of arithmetic, algebra, geometry, function theory and statistics. The section consists of 24 questions out of the total 160.
2. QC – Quantitative comparisons (in Swedish: KVA). This section examines the ability to make quantitative comparisons in the areas of arithmetic, algebra, geometry, function theory and statistics. The section consists of 20 questions out of the total 160.
3. DS – Data sufficiency (in Swedish: NOG). This section involves deciding whether enough information has been provided to solve a problem in arithmetic or geometry. The items require some mathematical skills, but is primarily aimed at testing the ability to draw logical conclusions. The section consists of 12 questions out of the total 160.
4. DTM – Diagrams, tables and maps (in Swedish: DTK). This section measures the ability to interpret diagrams, tables and maps. The questions demand both the ability to identify information and to analyse data from different sources. The section consists of 24 questions out of the total 160.

=== Verbal part (40+40 questions) ===
1. WORD – Vocabulary (in Swedish: ORD). This section tests awareness of the meaning of words and concepts. The words may be of Swedish or foreign origin. They may also be archaic or words that have come into use in Swedish in recent years. Some words are dialectal. The items are taken from many different subject areas, and may also include widely used technical terms. The section consists of 20 questions out of the total 160.
2. READ – Swedish reading comprehension (in Swedish: LÄS). This section tests the ability to understand five different texts in Swedish. The questions require the capacity to perceive details in the text and also to draw conclusions from the text as a whole. The section consists of 20 questions out of the total 160.
3. SEC – Sentence completion (in Swedish: MEK). This section examines the ability to put into words and phrases in context. The section consists of 20 questions out of the total 160.
4. ERC – English reading comprehension (in Swedish: ELF). This section tests the ability to read and understand a non-fictitious text in English (often picked from newspapers or magazines). It contains both long and short texts. One of the longer tests is a "Cloze test", which contains gaps where words have been omitted. The emphasis of this section is on the capacity to perceive information, follow an argument and draw conclusions on the basis of the text in English. The section consists of 20 questions out of the total 160.

=== The fifth subtest ===
At each test there is given an extra fifth subtest in order to develop new questions for future tests. This part consists of data from the aforementioned sections, but the result from this subtest is not counted. Which subtest was the test part is revealed after the whole test is concluded.

== Older versions of SweSAT ==
=== 1977–1991 ===
The purpose with the very first test, from 1977, was to provide upper-secondary school students with a "second chance", and to act as a selection instrument for candidates with at least 25 years of age and four years of work experience (known as 25/4:s). While the test was open for anyone to take, and free of charge, only the 25/4:s could use their scores for selection to higher education.

The first test consisted of 150 questions within six subtests: Vocabulary (WORD – 30 questions), Data sufficiency (DS – 20 questions), Reading comprehension (READ – 30 questions), Diagrams, tables and maps (DTM – 20 questions), General information (GI – 30 questions) and Study techniques (STECH – 20 questions). The latter was a verbal test in which the items asked for one or several pieces of information that could be found in an accompanying pamphlet complete with a table of contents and registers. The pamphlet was around 80 pages, and too time-consuming to read in its entirety, so test-takers had to use registers to find the requested information. As such it was the subtest most closely reflecting normal study situations.

Quite soon the original READ subtest proved to easy for test takers. In 1980 its True/False answer format was changed to the multiple-choice format that was already used in the other subtests, and the number of READ-items was reduced from 30 to 24.

=== 1991–1996 ===
After the trial period ended in 1991, the SweSAT could be used for selection purposes by all candidates to higher education – now even more than before acting as a "second chance" for students with uncompetitive grade point average.

Now the STECH subtest was replaced by English reading comprehension (ERC) with 24 questions. Another change concerned the evaluation of new questions. So far, items had been tried out on separate occasions, using students from upper-secondary school (who might be more, but probably less motivated than regular test-takers). From now on newly developed items would be included in the regular test in a try-out block, that do not count toward the test score. Test takers do not know which block is the try-out block until after the test.

=== 1996–2011 ===
From 1996 to autumn 2011 the test was divided into five sections. Each was given in subtests lasting 50 minutes, with the exception of the ERC and WORD sections being grouped into one subtest (35 and 15 minutes, respectively). One of these subtests were given twice, with only one of these being counted towards the test-takers' total scores and the other section was being used to evaluate questions for future tests, with the test-takers being unaware of which section being counted towards their total.

==== Sections ====
1. DTM – Diagrams, tables and maps. This section measures the ability to interpret diagrams, tables and maps. The questions demand both the ability to identify information and to analyse data from different sources. The section consists of 20 or 24 questions out of the total 122. (50 minutes)
2. WORD – Vocabulary. This section tests awareness of the meaning of words and concepts. The words may be of Swedish or foreign origin. They may also be archaic or words that have come into use in Swedish in recent years. Some words are dialectal. The items are taken from many different subject areas, and may also include widely used technical terms. The section consists of 30 or 40 questions out of the total 122. (15 minutes)
3. READ – Reading comprehension. This section tests the ability to understand five different texts in Swedish. The questions require the capacity to perceive details in the text and also to draw conclusions from the text as a whole. The section consists of 20 or 24 questions out of the total 122. (50 minutes)
4. ERC – English reading comprehension. The ability to read and understand a non-fictitious text (often picked from newspapers or magazines) in English is tested in this section. It contains both long and short texts. One of the longer tests is a "Cloze test", which contains gaps where words have been omitted. The emphasis of this section is on the capacity to perceive information, follow an argument and draw conclusions on the basis of the text in English. The section consists of 20 questions out of the total 122. (35 minutes)
5. DS – Data sufficiency. This section involves deciding whether enough information has been provided to solve a problem in arithmetic or geometry. The items require some mathematical skills, but is primarily aimed at testing the ability to draw logical conclusions. The section consists of 20 or 22 questions out of the total 122. (50 minutes)

== Registration ==
Registration for the test is done online through universitets och högskolerådets website www.hogskoleprov.nu. The cost for taking the test varies from year to year (550 SEK as of spring 2021.)

Before submitting payment, the test-taker may choose at which university or college they will write the test in, whereby they are placed in their educational institution of choice or another nearby school (most often in the same city).

== Research about högskoleprovet ==
- Henriksson, Widar; Wolming, Simon (1996). Study success in higher education: a comparison of students admitted on the basis of GPA and SweSAT-scores with and without credits for work experience (Em : educational measurement, 1103-2685; 18 ed.). Umeå: Umeå University.
- Cliffordsson, Christina (2004). "Effects of Practice and Intellectual Growth on Performance on the Swedish Scholastic Aptitude Test (SweSAT)". European Journal of Psychological Assessment. 20 (3): 192–204. doi:10.1027/1015-5759.20.3.192. hdl:2077/19166. ISSN 2151-2426.
- Lyrén, Per-Erik (2009). A perfect score: validity arguments for college admission tests (pdf). Umeå: Department of Educational Measurements.
- Wedman, Jonathan; Lyrén, Per-Erik (2015). "Methods for Examining the Psychometric Quality of Subscores - A Review and Application". Practical Assessment, Research & Evaluation. 20. ISSN 1531-7714.
- Stenlund, Tova (2017). "Group Differences in Test-Taking Behaviour - An example from a High-Stakes Testing Program". Assessment in Education. 24:1: 4–20. doi:10.1080/0969594X.2016.1142935. ISSN 0969-594X.
- Stenlund, Tova; Lyrén, Per-Erik; Eklöf, Hanna (2017-04-07). "The successful test taker: exploring test-taking behavior profiles through cluster analysis" (PDF). European Journal of Psychological Education. 33 (2): 403–417. doi:10.1007/s10212-017-0332-2.
- Wedman, Jonathan (2017). Theory and validity evidence for a large-scale test for selection to higher education. Umeå, Sweden: Umeå University. ISBN 978-91-7601-732-6.

== See also ==
- List of admission tests to colleges and universities
- Education in Sweden
- List of universities in Sweden
