= Södertörn University =

University in Sweden

- Södertörns högskola
- Type: public
- Established: 1996; 30 years ago
- Rector: Ylva Fältholm
- Students: 13,921 (2024) Full Time:7 484 (2024)
- Doctoral students: 100 (2024)
- Location: Södertörn, Sweden; 59.21970°N 17.94308°E
- Campus: Flemingsberg
- Website: www.sh.se

Södertörn University (Swedish: Södertörns högskola) is a Swedish public higher education institution located in Flemingsberg, in Huddinge Municipality in Stockholm County. The university serves the Södertörn area in southern Greater Stockholm and has approximately 14,000 students enrolled across around 80 programmes and more than 300 courses.

The university offers education and conducts research in the humanities, social sciences, technology, and natural sciences. It also provides teacher education with an intercultural profile and is responsible for delivering the national basic police training programme.

Much of the university’s research focuses on issues related to the Baltic Sea region and Eastern Europe. Within Baltic and East European Studies, Södertörn University hosts a specialised research environment. The Centre for Baltic and East European Studies publishes the multidisciplinary journal Baltic Worlds, which has subscribers in around 50 countries.

Södertörn University has a government mandate to provide teacher education specialising in Romani Chib and Romani culture and history, carried out in close collaboration with the Romani minority.

The university’s main building, Moas båge, inaugurated in 2002, was designed by White Arkitekter and named after the author Moa Martinson.

== History ==
Södertörn University was established in 1996 following a parliamentary decision made the previous year, after extensive investigation into the need to expand higher education in southern Greater Stockholm. Factors behind the decision included comparatively low transition rates to higher education, high unemployment, and pronounced segregation in parts of the region.

At the time of the university’s establishment, Karolinska Institutet had already relocated its dental programme to Flemingsberg, while both KTH and Stockholm University operated certain activities in the area. The Novum research park was also beginning to develop.

When Södertörn University opened in 1996, it had approximately 1,000 students and activities located in Södertälje, Flemingsberg, and Haninge. Initially, the vice-chancellor of Stockholm University also served as Vice-Chancellor of Södertörn University, but on 1 January 1997 Per Thullberg assumed the position full-time, and the university gained the right to award its own degrees.

In 2002 the current main building, Moas båge, was inaugurated in Flemingsberg. The following year, the building received the Swedish Concrete Association’s Outdoor Environment Prize. The new facilities enabled the relocation of teacher education from Södertälje to Flemingsberg, and Campus Telge was subsequently closed. In 2006 the governing board decided to relocate all remaining activities from Campus Haninge to Campus Flemingsberg by autumn 2008.

In 2002 Södertörn University applied for full university status, an application that has not yet been processed. In 2004 the university, together with Karolinska Institutet and KTH, submitted a proposal to establish a joint network university at Södertörn, inspired by the collegiate model used at the University of Oxford. An updated application was submitted to the government in 2006.

On 1 July 2010, the Swedish National Agency for Higher Education granted Södertörn University the right to award doctoral degrees in Historical Studies, Critical Cultural Theory, Environmental Science, and Politics, Economy and the Organisation of Society. In November 2017, the Swedish Higher Education Authority authorised the university to award licentiate and doctoral degrees in Educational Science.

== Academic profile ==
Södertörn University has a multidisciplinary and intercultural academic profile, with a particular emphasis on civic education. This focus was especially prominent during the tenure of Vice-Chancellor Ingela Josefson.

The university has also developed a distinctive profile in philosophy and is one of the few higher education institutions in Sweden where philosophy is primarily taught within the continental tradition, in contrast to the analytical tradition that dominates most philosophy departments in the country.

== Organisation ==
Teaching and research at Södertörn University are organised into academic schools. As of the mid-2020s, the university comprises five schools:

- School of Historical and Contemporary Studies
- School of Culture and Education
- School of Social Sciences
- School of Natural Sciences, Technology and Environmental Studies
- School of Police Sciences

In addition, the university hosts university-wide programmes in teacher education and police training, drawing on staff from multiple schools.

== Subjects ==
Södertörn University offers education in a wide range of subjects, including archaeology, archival science, library and information science, biology, English, aesthetics, ethnology, philosophy, business studies, gender studies, geography, history, history of ideas, informatics, international relations, journalism, law, art history, comparative literature, media and communication studies, media technology, environmental science, economics, public administration, public law, education, practical knowledge, psychology, religious studies, rhetoric, social work, sociology, political science, Swedish, tourism studies, and development and international cooperation.

== Research ==
Research at Södertörn University is conducted in the humanities, social sciences, natural sciences, technology, and educational science. In 2024, external grants and funding for research and doctoral education totalled approximately SEK 417 million, corresponding to around 36 per cent of the university’s total operations.

A substantial share of the university’s research funding is provided by the Foundation for Baltic and East European Studies (Östersjöstiftelsen), which supports research focusing on the Baltic Sea region and Eastern Europe. The foundation also finances several research centres and contributes to the university library.

== Institutes and research centres ==
Södertörn University hosts several research centres and institutes, including:

- Centre for Baltic and East European Studies (CBEES)
- Academy of Public Administration
- Centre for Studies in Practical Knowledge
- ENTER – Forum for Research on Entrepreneurship
- Institute of Contemporary History (SHI)
- Stockholm Centre on Health of Societies in Transition (SCOHOST)
- Maritime Archaeology Research Institute (MARIS)

== Internationalisation ==
Södertörn University’s internationalisation strategy emphasises diversity, intercultural perspectives, and international exchange for students and staff. The university is also part of the European Universities Alliance KreativEU, funded through the Erasmus+ programme for the period 2025–2028.

== Library ==
Södertörn University Library serves Södertörn University, the Swedish Red Cross University, and the University College of Music Education in Stockholm (SMI), and is open to the public. The current library building was inaugurated in 2004 and was awarded the Kasper Salin Prize for architecture the same year.

== Vice-Chancellors ==
- 1997–2002: Per Thullberg
- 2003–2010: Ingela Josefson
- 2010–2016: Moira von Wright
- 2016–2025: Gustav Amberg
- From 2025: Ylva Fältholm
