= Litteris et Artibus =

Swedish royal medal

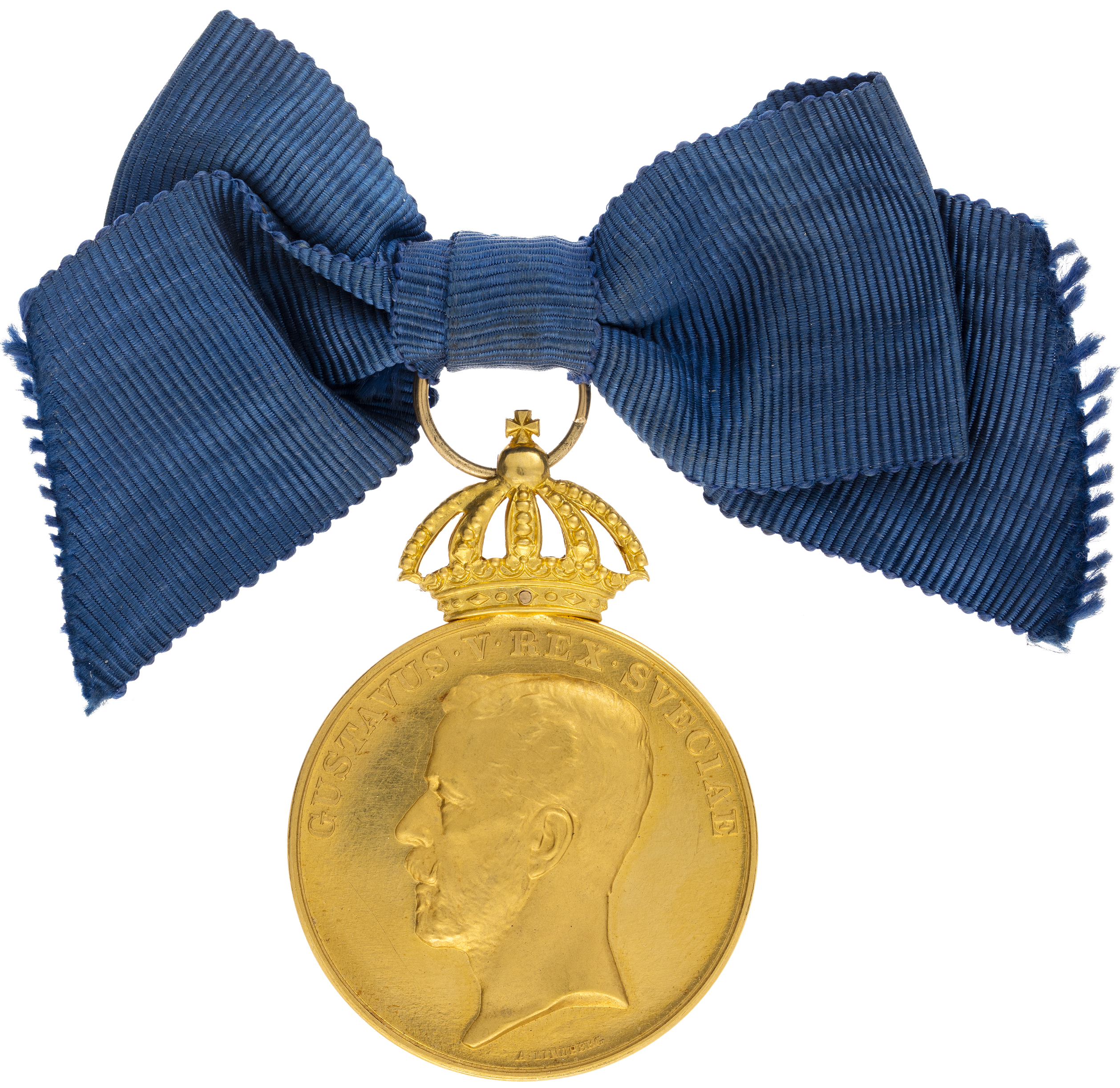
- Type: Royal medal
- Country: Sweden
- Presented by: The King of Sweden
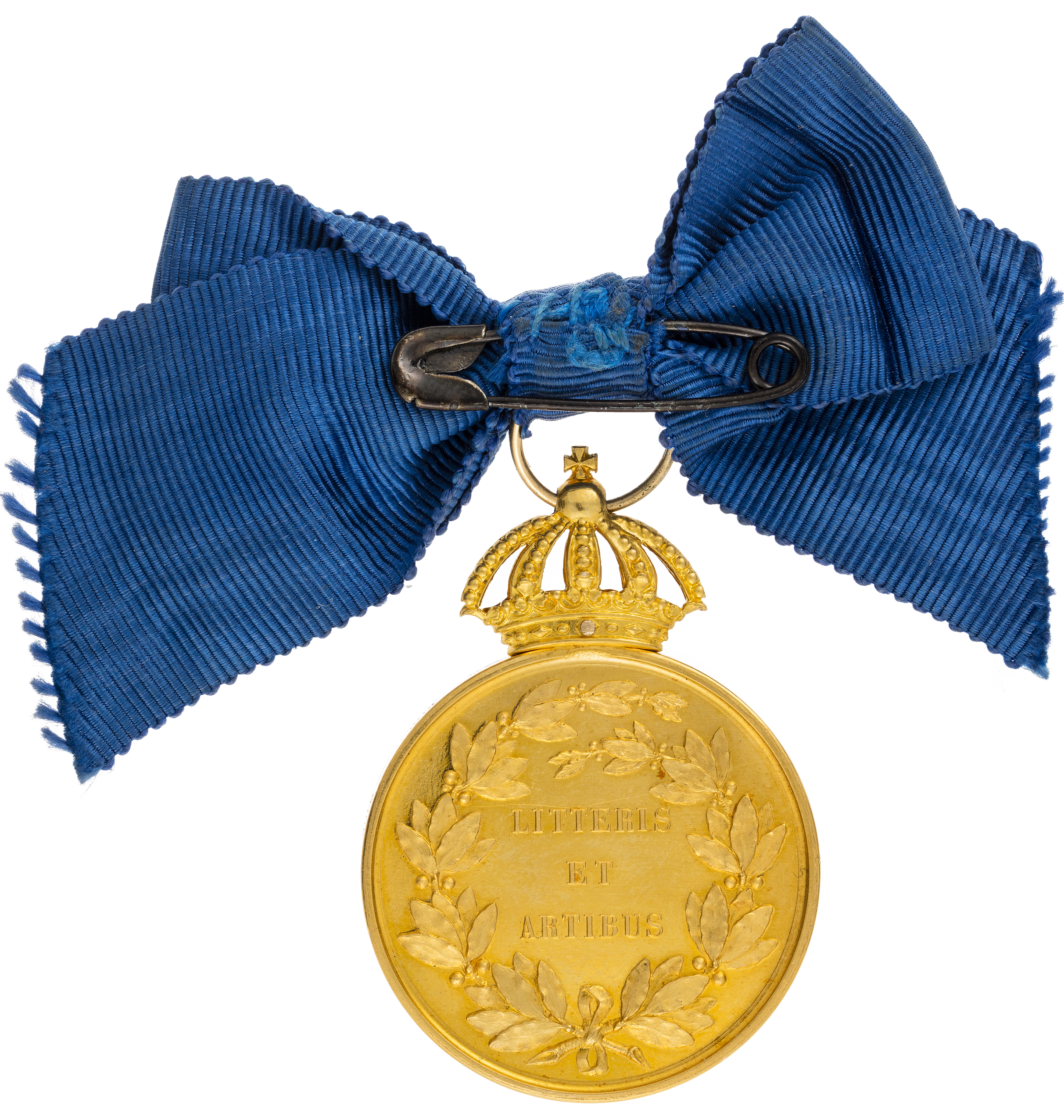
- Reverse
- Established: 1853
- Website: https://www.kungahuset.se/sveriges-monarki/ordnar-och-medaljer/medaljer#h-LitterisetArtibus

Order of Wear
- Next (higher): H. M. The King's Medal
- Next (lower): Prince Eugen Medal

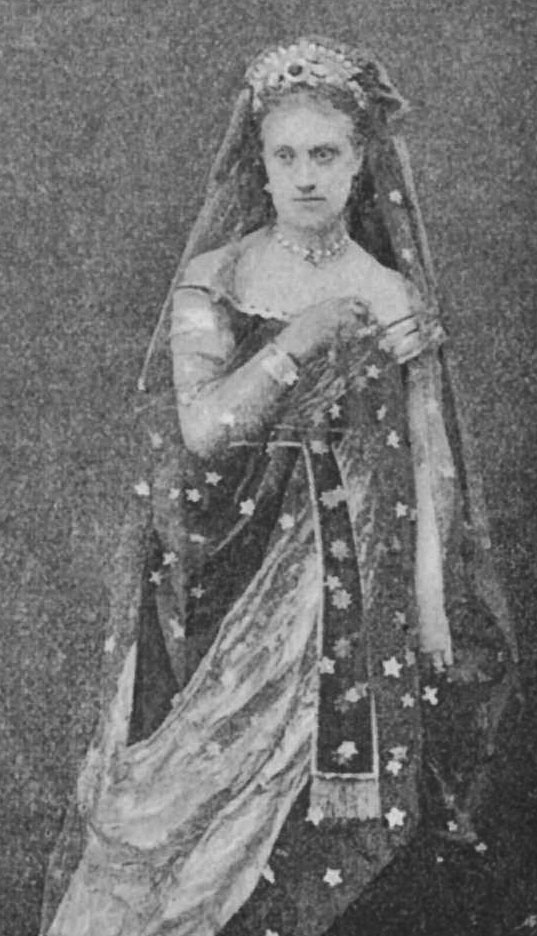
Louise Michaëli.

Litteris et Artibus is a Swedish royal medal established in 1853 by Charles XV of Sweden, who was then crown prince. It is awarded to people who have made important contributions to culture, especially music, dramatic art and literature.

The obverse side of the medal has the image of the current King while the reverse has the text "Litteris et Artibus" (Latin: Letters and Arts).

== Recipients ==
- 1857 – Karolina Bock
- 1865 – Elise Hwasser
- 1869 – Louise Michaëli
- 1871 – Henriette Nissen-Saloman
- 1874 – Béla Kéler
- 1885 – Bertha Tammelin
- 1886 – Ellen Hartman
- 1890 – Dina Edling
- 1891 – Thecla Åhlander, Agi Lindegren, Carolina Östberg
- 1894 – Herman af Sillén
- 1895 – Mathilda Grabow
- 1896 – Agnes Branting
- 1899 – John Forsell
- 1900 – Adelina Patti
- 1906 – Martina Bergman-Österberg
- 1907 – Armas Järnefelt
- 1914 – Alice Tegnér
- 1914 – Anna Bergström-Simonsson
- 1915 – Anna Oscàr
- 1916 – Hugo Alfvén, Harriet Bosse, Carl Boberg
- 1919 – Maria Mogensen
- 1920 – Nanny Larsén-Todsen, Wilhelm Kempff
- 1921 – Lotten Dahlgren
- 1922 – Sigrid Leijonhufvud
- 1923 – Helena Nyblom
- 1924 – Märta Måås-Fjetterström
- 1925 – Pauline Brunius, Ellen Roosval von Hallwyl
- 1926 – Carl Malmsten
- 1927 – Ida von Schulzenheim
- 1928 – Tora Teje
- 1932 – Oskar Lindberg
- 1934 – Olof Winnerstrand, Helga Görlin
- 1937 – Greta Garbo
- 1940 – Irma Björck
- 1950 – Tyra Lundgren
- 1952 – Marian Anderson
- 1960 – Birgit Nilsson
- 1968 – Nicolai Gedda
- 1969 – Eric Ericson, Elisabeth Söderström
- 1973 – Erland Josephson
- 1975 – Astrid Lindgren, Erik Saedén, Margaretha Krook
- 1976 – Margareta Hallin
- 1977 – Birgit Cullberg, Alf Henrikson, Lars-Erik Larsson, Allan Pettersson
- 1978 – Povel Ramel, Gunnar de Frumerie, Dag Wirén
- 1979 – Anders Ek, Gunn Wållgren
- 1980 – Erik Bruhn
- 1981 – Tage Danielsson, Lars Johan Werle, Hans Alfredson
- 1982 – Ernst-Hugo Järegård, Götz Friedrich
- 1983 – Birgitta Valberg, Ingvar Kjellson
- 1986 – Bengt Hambraeus, Jan Malmsjö, Sif Ruud
- 1987 – Nils Poppe
- 1988 – Per Myrberg
- 1989 – Bibi Andersson
- 1990 – Mona Malm, Sven Delblanc, Ulf Johanson
- 1991 – Lars Gunnar Bodin, Lars Fresk, Freskkvartetten
- 1992 – Börje Ahlstedt, Harriet Andersson, Tomas Tranströmer
- 1993 – Gösta Winbergh, Håkan Hagegård, Lars Forssell
- 1994 – Sven-David Sandström
- 1995 – Daniel Börtz, Lennart Hjulström
- 1996 – Esa-Pekka Salonen, P. C. Jersild, Per Anders Fogelström, Solveig Ternström
- 1997 – Bo Widerberg, Göran Tunström, Kristina Adolphson, Sara Lidman
- 1998 – Kerstin Ekman, Georg Reidel, Gerda Antti, Margareta Ekström
- 1999 – Björn Ulvaeus, Agneta Pleijel, Anne Sofie von Otter, Lennart Hellsing, Marie Göranzon, Olle Johansson, Stina Ekblad, Willy Kyrklund, Ylva Eggehorn
- 2000 – Björn Granath, Hans Gefors, Krister Henriksson, Maria Gripe, Per Olov Enquist
- 2001 – Anita Wall, Dan Laurin, Kim Anderzon, Majgull Axelsson, Mats Ek, Staffan Göthe, Staffan Valdemar Holm
- 2002 – Staffan Göthe, Arne Domnérus, Loa Falkman, Jan Sandström, Lena Endre, Olle Adolphson, Pernilla August, Roland Pöntinen, Sven-Bertil Taube, Torgny Lindgren
- 2003 – Marie Fredriksson, Eva Bergman, Håkan Hardenberger, Karin Rehnqvist, Kristina Lugn, Lars Amble
- 2004 – Birgitta Trotzig, Catarina Ligendza, Christian Lindberg, Hillevi Martinpelto, Katarina Dalayman, Knut Ahnlund, Lena Nyman, Lil Terselius
- 2005 – Bertil Norström, Eva Ström, Gunnel Vallquist, Ingvar Hirdwall, Irene Lindh, Jan Troell, Per Tengstrand, Per Wästberg, Peter Jablonski, Putte Wickman
- 2006 – Henning Mankell, Bobo Stenson, Inger Sandberg, Johan Rabaeus, Lars Gustafsson, Lasse Sandberg
- 2007 – Reine Brynolfsson, Carola Häggkvist
- 2008 – Carl-Göran Ekerwald, Alf Hambe, Gunnar Harding, Inga Landgré, Lars Norén, Malin Ek, Nina Stemme
- 2009 – Katinka Faragó, Meg Westergren, Roy Andersson, Örjan Ramberg
- 2010 – Bodil Malmsten, Dan Ekborg, Malin Hartelius
- 2011 – Malena Ernman, Mats Bergström, Sten Ljunggren, Peter Mattei, Marie Richardson
- 2012 – Anders Paulsson, Martin Fröst, Wilhelm Carlsson, Lena Josefsson, Charlotta Larsson, Jan-Erik Wikström
- 2013 – Åke Lundqvist, Per Nyström, Vibeke Olsson Falk, Kristina Törnqvist, Sven Wollter
- 2014 – Tomas von Brömssen, Pers Anna Larsson, Staffan Mårtensson, Ingela Olsson
- 2015 – Rigmor Gustafsson, Livia Millhagen, Ann Petrén, Therese Brunnander
- 2016 – Kerstin Avemo, Malin Byström, Anders Eljas, Nils Landgren, Lars Lerin, Magnus Lindgren, Elin Rombo, Johannes Öhman
- 2017 – Elisabeth Eriksson, Ann Hallenberg, Elin Klinga, Lars Humble, Ola Larsmo, Lisa Nilsson
- 2018 – Rolf Martinsson, Dan-Olof Stenlund, Iréne Theorin, Helen Sjöholm, Per Åhlin
- 2019 – Gunilla Bergström, Lars Lind, Peter Andersson, Katarina Ewerlöf, Erland Hagegård, Bengt Krantz
- 2020 – Kicki Bramberg, Lisa Larsson, Gunilla Röör, Gregor Zubicky, Gary Graden, Per Gudmundson, Sissela Kyle, Johan Ulveson, Ingrid Tobiasson
- 2021 – Gun-Britt, Alexander Ekman, Pia Johansson, Ragnar Håkanson, Daniel Johansson, Mats Larsson Gothe, Lena Philipsson, Magnus Uggla, Mattias Andersson, Jill Johnson, Sofia Jupither Adrian, Peter Jöback, Bo W. Lindström, Susanne Resmark, Ulrika Wallenström
- 2022 – Leif Andrée, Manne af Klintberg, Ulla Skoog, Michael Weinius, Tomas Boström, Henrik Dorsin, Merit Hemmingson, Tommy Körberg, Patrik Ringborg, Cajsa Stina Åkerström
- 2023 – Ada Berger, Ludwig Göransson, Hans Josefsson, Efva Lilja, Veronica Maggio, Shanti Roney, Annsofi Östbergh Nyberg, Gunnel Fred, Thomas Hanzon, Ola Salo, Janne Schaffer
- 2024 – Lennart Jähkel, Laleh Pourkarim, Ingela Strandberg, Elisabet Strid, Georg Wadenius, Nina Zanjani
- 2025 – Birgitta Andersson, Orup, Siri Hamari, Mikael Samuelson, Tobias Theorell, Klas Östergren
- 2026 – Niklas Strömstedt, Sylvia Vrethammar, Ingela Brimberg, Fares Fares, Andreas T Olsson

== See also ==
- Orders, decorations, and medals of Sweden
