= Helga Görlin =

Swedish soprano and voice teacher

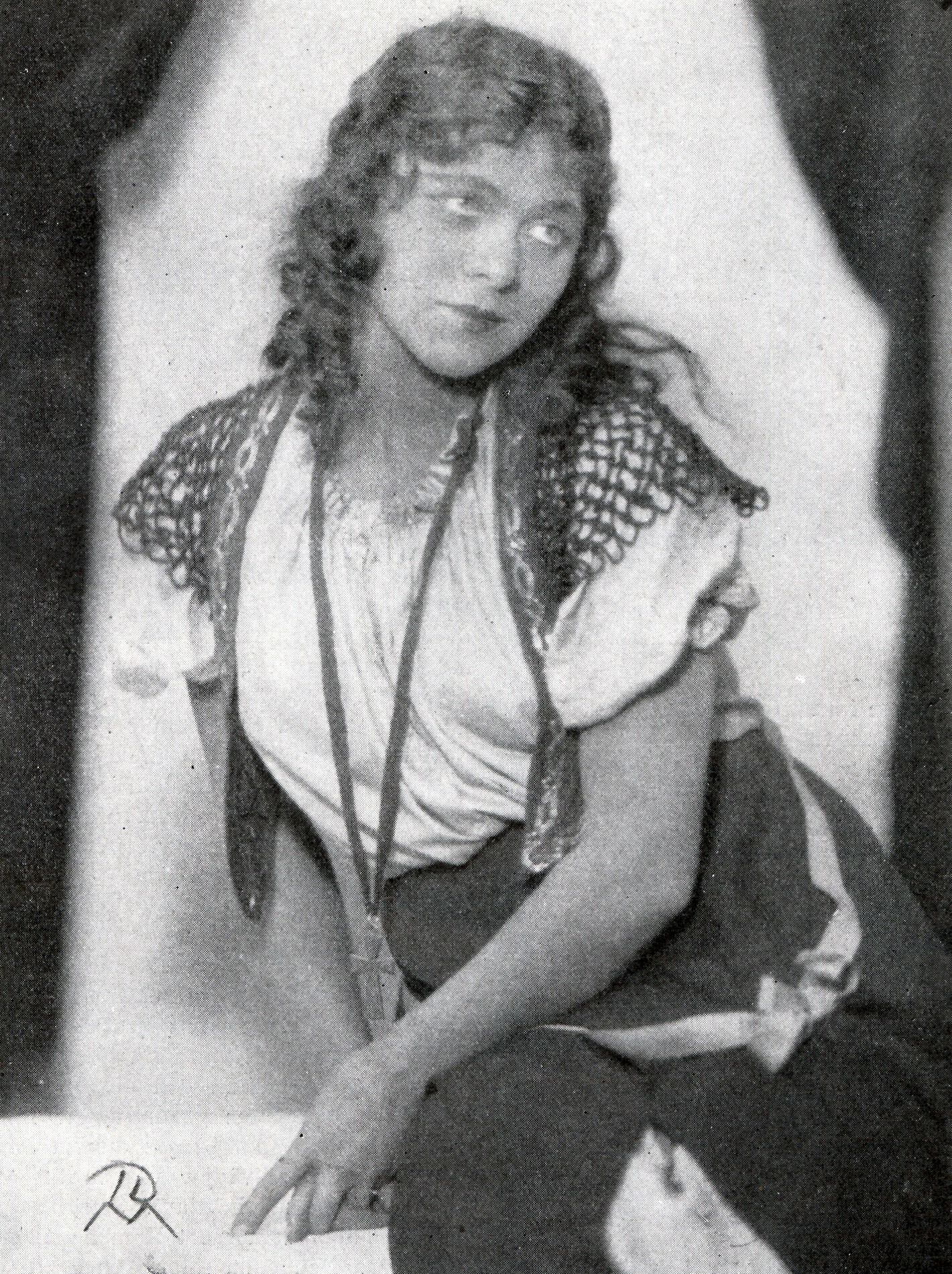
Helga Görlin as Ambroise Thomas's Mignon in 1927

Helga Maria Görlin (26 September 1900 – 31 January 1993) was a Swedish soprano and voice teacher. She performed as a resident leading soprano at the Royal Swedish Opera from 1926 to 1951, and later returned as a guest artist at that theatre for her final stage performance in 1954 as Cio-Cio San in Puccini's Madama Butterfly. A frequent romantic stage partner of tenor Jussi Björling during the 1930s and 1940s, she notably portrayed the role of Minnie in the Swedish premiere of Puccini's La fanciulla del West in 1934 with Björling as Dick Johnson. She also created roles in the world premieres of operas by Kurt Atterberg, Natanael Berg, and Hilding Rosenberg during her career.

In addition to opera, Görlin also performed works from the soprano concert repertoire and was particularly known for her performances of the soprano solos in Handel's Messiah; a work she sang annually for many years at the Royal Theatre, Stockholm. She also was active as a recitalist and was an admired singer of lieder. In 1937 she portrayed the opera singer Jenny Lind in the film John Ericsson, Victor of Hampton Roads. She was the recipient of several awards during her career, including the Litteris et Artibus (1934) and the title of Hovsångare (1941). In 1977 she was elected as a member of the Royal Swedish Academy of Music. After retiring from the stage in 1954 she taught voice at the Royal College of Music, Stockholm.

== Life and career ==
Born in Nolby Stom, Eda Parish, Värmland County, Sweden, Görlin was the daughter of Jan Peter Görlin and Karin Jonsdotter. The youngest of four children, her oldest sibling was 29 years old and already married at the time of her birth. Her father was a master blacksmith.

Görlin began her vocal training with Gillis Bratt in Stockholm before pursuing further studies in Berlin with Ludwig Mantler and also private studies in Paris. In 1925 she auditioned for John Forsell, the director of the Royal Swedish Opera (RSO) in Stockholm, and under his recommendation was admitted into the Royal Opera School (later known as the University College of Opera; and now part of the Stockholm University of the Arts). She studied under Forsell at the Royal Opera School for two years.

Görlin made her professional opera debut in 1926 as Mélisande in Claude Debussy's Pelléas et Mélisande at the RSO. She remained at that opera house as a resident artist for the next 25 years; retiring from that position in 1951. She had particular triumphs at that theatre in the roles of Liu in Giacomo Puccini's Turandot (1927) and the title roles in Richard Strauss' Arabella (1938) and Gustave Charpentier's Louise (1932). She also created roles in the world premieres of several operas at that theatre, including Natanael Berg's Engelbrekt (1929, as Karin), Hilding Rosenberg's Die Reise nach Amerika (1932), Kurt Atterberg's Fanal (1934, as Rosamund), and Hilding Rosenberg's Marionetter (1939). In 1934 she portrayed Minnie in the Swedish premiere of Puccini's La fanciulla del West with Jussi Björling as Dick Johnson at the RSO. Görlin was a frequent romantic lead opposite Björling at the RSO in the 1930s and 1940s; portraying role like Adina in L'elisir d'amore, Juliette in Roméo et Juliette, and the title role in Giuseppe Verdi's Aida opposite the tenor.

As a guest artist, Görlin performed the role of Marguerite in Charles Gounod's Faust at the Finnish National Opera in 1949. In 1952 she gave a concert tour throughout the United States. She returned to the RSO as a guest artist in 1954 to perform the final opera appearance of her career; the role of Cid-Cio-San in Puccini's Madama Butterfly. Other roles in her repertoire included Antonia in The Tales of Hoffmann, Dorabella in Così fan tutte, Euridice in Orfeo ed Euridice, the Goose Maid in Engelbert Humperdinck's Königskinder, Pamina in The Magic Flute, Susanna in The Marriage of Figaro, Zerlina in Don Giovanni, and the title roles Ambroise Thomas's Mignon, Pyotr Tchaikovsky's Iolanta, and Puccini's Manon Lescaut.

In addition to her work as an operatic soprano, Görlin also performed works from the concert and recital repertoire. For many years she was the soprano soloist in annual performances of the Handel's Messiah at the Royal Theatre, Stockholm. She was an admired interpreter of lieder. After retiring form the stage in 1954 she worked as a voice teacher at the Royal College of Music, Stockholm where one of her pupils was the baritone Håkan Hagegård. She was the recipient of several awards during her career, including the Litteris et Artibus (1934) and the title of Hovsångare (1941). In 1977 she was elected as a member of the Royal Swedish Academy of Music. Her voice is preserved on recording made for His Master's Voice, Odeon Records, and Parlophone. In 1937 she portrayed opera singer Jenny Lind in the film John Ericsson, Victor of Hampton Roads.

She was awarded the Latvian Order of the Three Stars 5th Class on 16 May 1935. Helga Görlin died 31 January 1993, aged 92, in Farsta, south of Stockholm.
