= Daniel Johansson (tenor) =

Swedish tenor (born 1980)

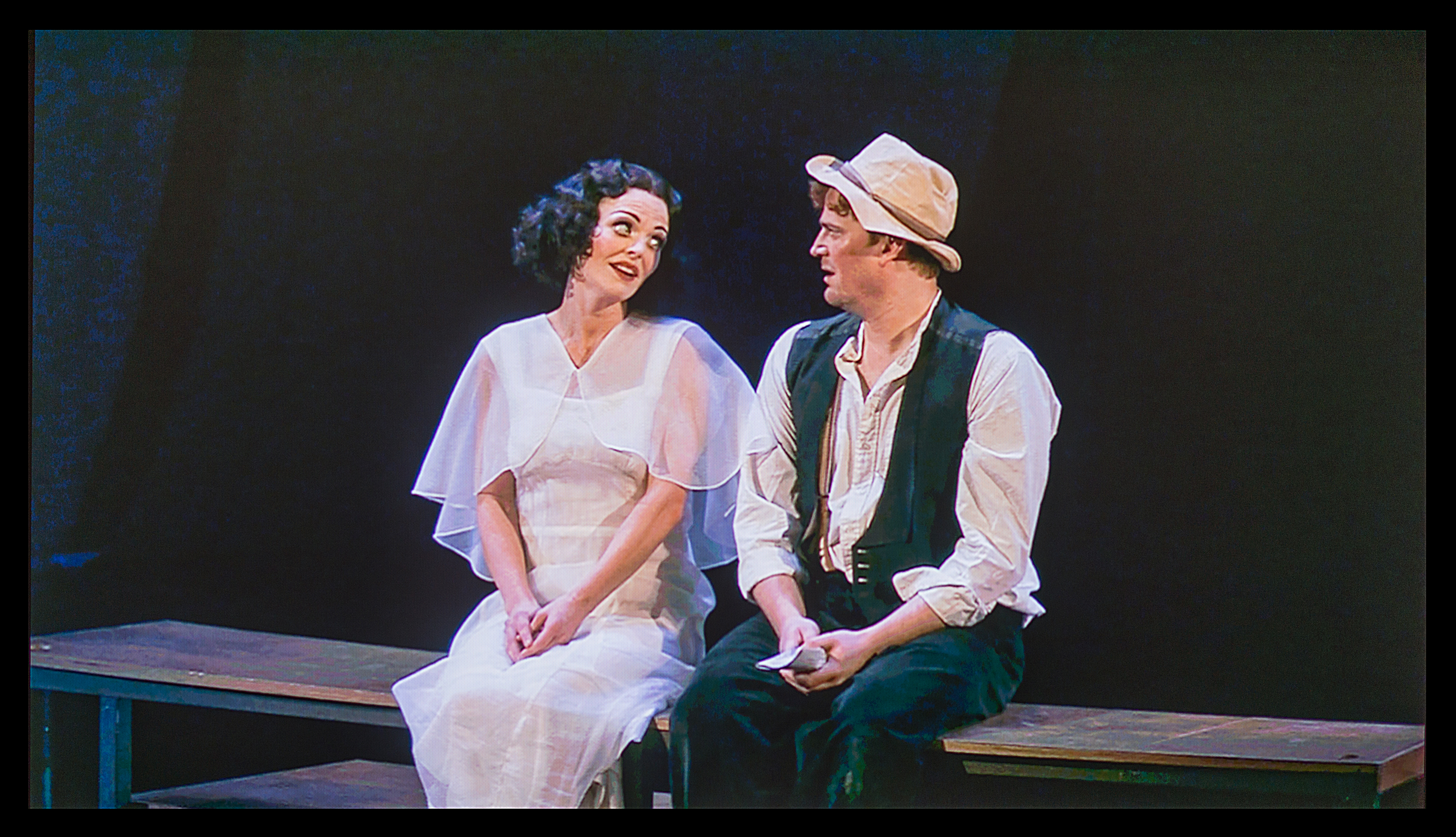
Elin Rombo as Adina and Daniel Johansson as Nemorino in Kärleksdrycken (L'elisir d'amore) at the Gothenburg Opera in 2013.

Daniel Mattias Johansson (born 4 August 1980) is a Swedish operatic and concert tenor. He became a hovsångare, or a Swedish "Court Singer", in 2018.

== Life ==
=== Training ===
Johansson was educated at the University College of Opera 2006–2010. He previously studied music at the Ljungskile folkhögskola.

During his studies, he was a soloist at the Sveriges Television "Thirteen-Day Concert 2008" from Berwaldhallen with the Swedish Radio Symphony Orchestra under the direction of Thomas Søndergård. Then, together with Miah Persson, he performed the love duet from La Bohème by Giacomo Puccini.

== Opera ==
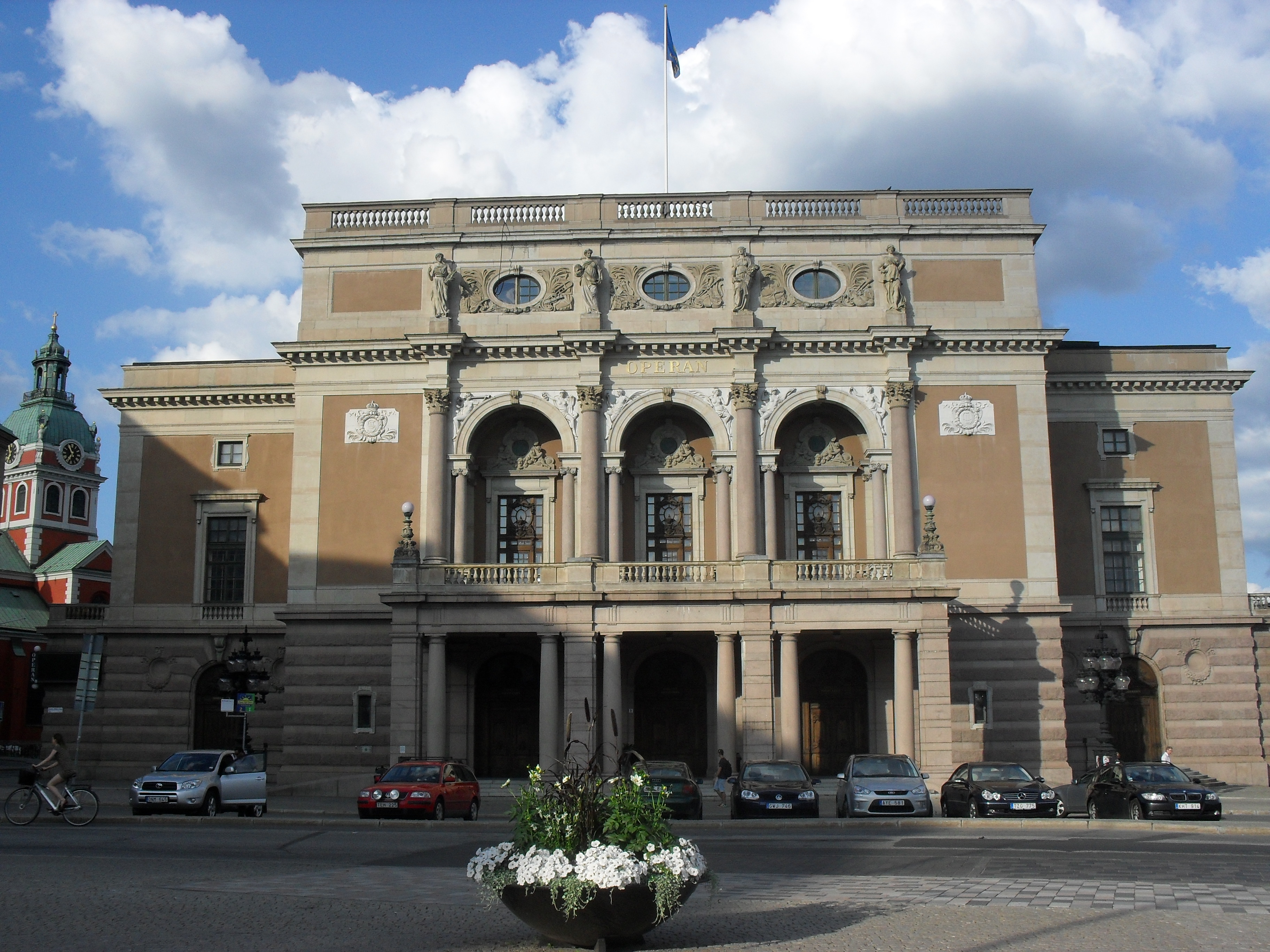
Daniel Johansson made his debut at The Royal Opera in 2013 as Tamino in The Magic Flute. Here he has since been involved in several roles and productions.

Johansson has sung Rodolfo in La Boheme and Hoffmann in The Tales of Hoffmann, both at the Bregenzer Festspiele and The Royal Opera in Stockholm (2011) as well as in Helsinki and Oslo. He has sung Pinkerton in Madama Butterfly at the Royal Opera (2014) and Opera Hedeland in Denmark. He has appeared in the role of Alfredo in La traviata both in Stockholm (2015), in Oslo (2015), at the Opera Hedeland and at the Grand Théâtre de Genève. He has also sung Tamino in The Magic Flute in Valencia, Oslo and Stockholm (2012), and Nemorino in L'elisir d'amore on Dalhalla (2011) and at Göteborgsoperan (2013).

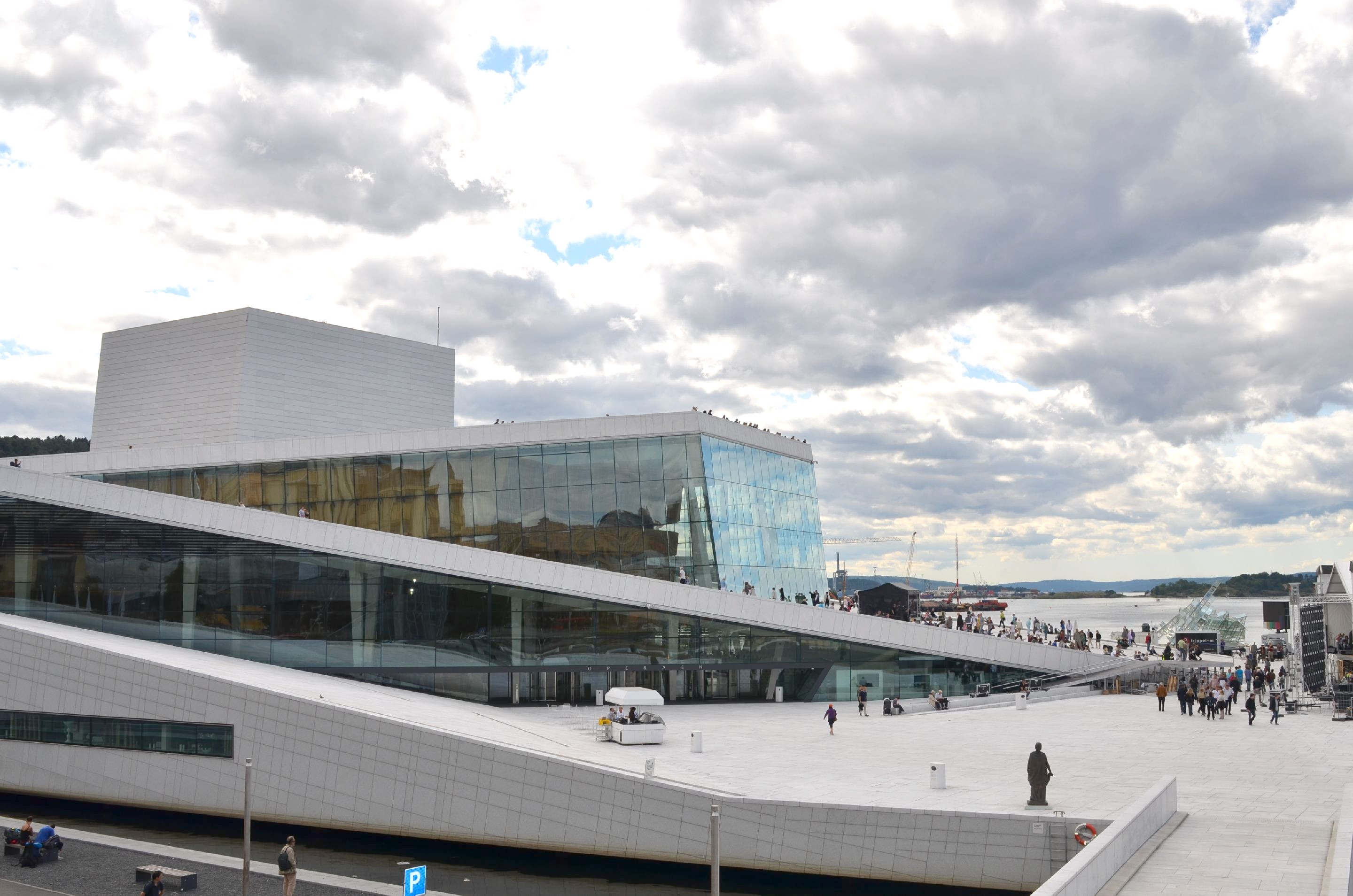
Norwegian National Opera and Ballet in Oslo. has been tied there for a few seasons.

Johansson has been associated with the Norwegian Opera in Oslo and has appeared in roles such as Alfred in Die Fledermaus, Narraboth in Salome, Macduff in Macbeth and Telemaco in Monteverdi's Il ritorno d'Ulisse in patria.

Other engagements include the title role in Faust on Folkoperan and Lensky in performances of Eugene Onegin at the Norrlandsoperan within the framework of Umeå Kulturhuvudstad 2014 and in Chautauqua County, New York.

=== Roles ===
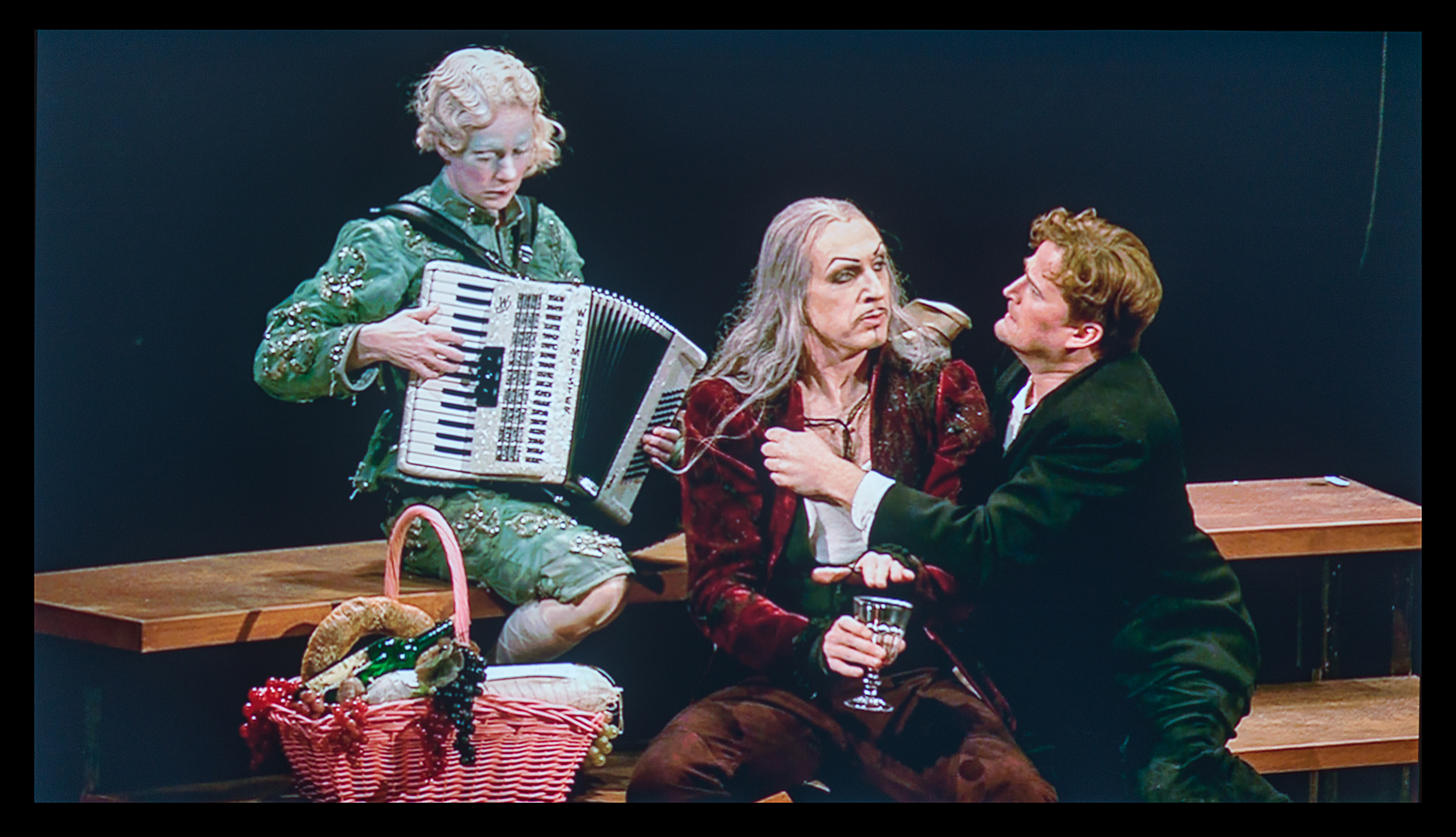
Daniel Johansson as Nemorino (right) and Åke Zetterström as Dulcamara (center) in L'elisir d'amore at the Göteborgsoperan 2013.

Johansson's opera roles for the first time on stage during 2011–2018.
| Title role | Opera | composer | Month and year | Location |
|---|---|---|---|---|
| Nemorino | L'elisir d'amore | Gaetano Donizetti | June 2011 | Dalhalla |
| Telemaco | Il ritorno d'Ulisse in patria | Claudio Monteverdi | May 2012 | Den Norske Opera |
| Narraboth | Salome | Richard Strauss | May 2013 | Den Norske Opera |
| Faust | Faust | Charles Gounod | June 2013 | Folkoperan |
| Pinkerton | Madama Butterfly | Giacomo Puccini | Aug 2013 | Opera Hedeland |
| Tamino | the Magic Flute | Wolfgang Amadeus Mozart | September 2013 | Royal Swedish Opera |
| Alfred | Die Fledermaus | Johann Strauss | December 2013 | Den Norske Opera |
| Macduff | Macbeth | Giuseppe Verdi | December 2013 | Den Norske Opera |
| Rudolfo | La Boheme | Giacomo Puccini | January 2014 | Den Norske Opera |
| Vladimir Lenskij | Eugene Onegin | Pjotr Tjajkovskij | February 2014 | Norrlandsoperan |
| Don José | Carmen | Georges Bizet | March 2015 | Den Norske Opera |
| Alfredo Germont | La traviata | Giuseppe Verdi | April 2015 | Den Norske Opera |
| Hoffmann | Die Fledermaus | Jacques Offenbach | July 2015 | Bregenzer Festspiele |
| A singer | Der Rosenkavalier | Richard Strauss | September 2015 | Royal Swedish Opera |
| Florestan | Fidelio | Ludwig van Beethoven | January 2016 | Malmö Live Konserthus |
| Froh | Das Rheingold | Richard Wagner | October 2016 | Semperoper, Dresden |
| Lohengrin | Lohengrin | Richard Wagner | December 2016 | Aalto-Musiktheater, Essen |
| Mario Cavaradossi | la Tosca | Giacomo Puccini | June 2017 | Den Norske Opera |
| Siegmund | Die Walküre | Richard Wagner | December 2017 | Theater an der Wien |
| Greve Loris Ipanov | Fedora | Umberto Giordano | March 2018 | Royal Swedish Opera |
| Matteo | Arabella | Richard Strauss | October 2018 | San Francisco Opera |

=== Concert ===
Johansson has sung Melot at concert performances of Tristan and Isolde with both the Swedish Radio Symphony Orchestra and conductor Daniel Harding as well as with the Orchestre de Paris and its conductor Christoph Eschenbach. He has sung Mozart's Coronation Mass at the opening of Danmarks Radio's new concert hall under the direction of Adam Fischer, Herden in Oedipus Rex with the Swedish Radio Symphony Orchestra and Esa-Pekka Salonen in Stockholm and in Brussels, as well as the tenor part in the chamber version of Das Lied von der Erde with Nordiska Kammarorkestern in Sundsvall, Västerås Sinfonietta and with Oulu's Symphony Orchestra.

He introduced himself to a wider audience in 2013, when he, together with several of Sweden's foremost artists, participated in Sweden's Riksdag televised celebration of King Carl XVI Gustaf's 40 years as head of state in Sweden.

== Recording ==
Johansson can be heard as Magnus Gabriel De la Gardie in Jacopo Foroni's Cristina Regina di Svezia (Sterling) with Göteborgsoperan's orchestra under the direction of Tobias Ringborg.

== Prizes and honours ==
- Scholarships from the Royal Academy of Music
- 2007 – 1st prize in Gösta Winbergh Award
- 2008 – Scholarship from Anders Walls Stiftelser.
- 2012 – Håkan Mogren.
- 2012 – 1st prize and audience prize in Wilhelm Stenhammar International Music Competition.
- 2018 – Hovsångare
