= Hovsångare =

Swedish honorific title

The titles hovsångare (Swedish: [ˈhôːvˌsɔŋːarɛ], literally "Court Singer") for men and hovsångerska (Swedish: [ˈhôːvˌsɔŋːɛʂka]) for women are awarded by the Swedish monarch to a singer (usually an opera singer) who, by their vocal art, has contributed to the international standing of Swedish singing. The formal title was introduced by King Gustav III of Sweden in 1773, with the first recipients being Elisabeth Olin and Carl Stenborg. The position as such, however, dates back to the 17th century, when Anne Chabanceau de La Barre and Joseph Chabanceau de La Barre were singers at the court of Queen Christina of Sweden.

== Named ==
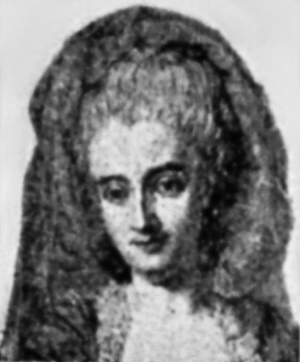
Elisabeth Olin

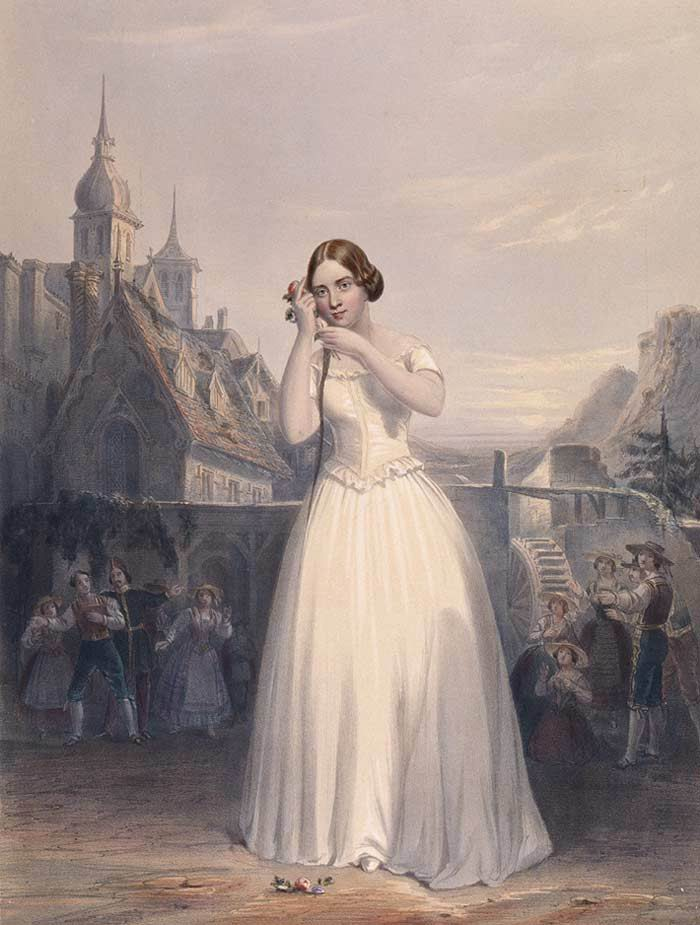
Jenny Lind in La sonnambula

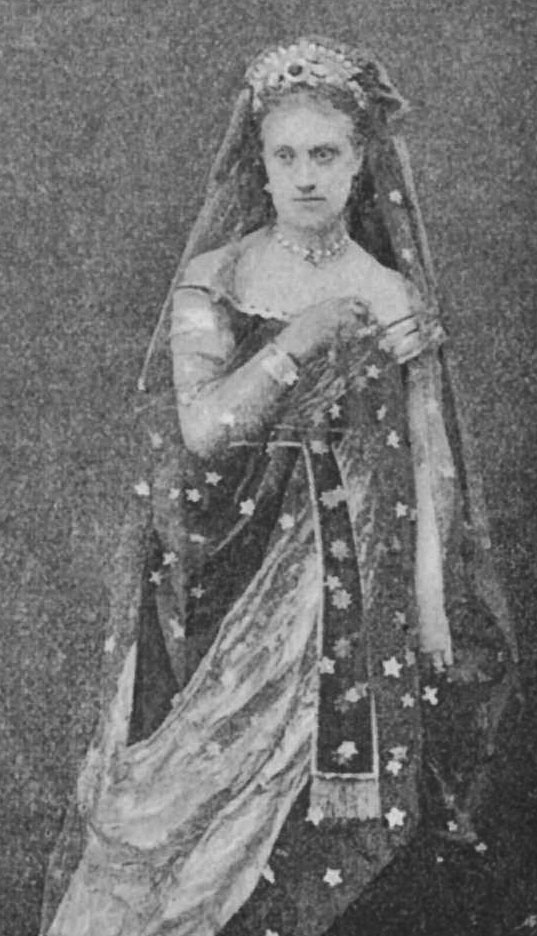
Louise Michaëli.

=== 21st century ===
- 2025: Christina Nilsson
- 2021: Ann Hallenberg, John Lundgren
- 2018: Malin Byström, Katarina Karnéus, Daniel Johansson.
- 2013: Elin Rombo, Michael Weinius
- 2010: Anna Larsson, Malena Ernman, Miah Persson
- 2006: Nina Stemme, Hillevi Martinpelto
- 2004: Karl-Magnus Fredriksson, Peter Mattei
- 2003: Loa Falkman
- 2002: Helena Döse
- 2000: Katarina Dalayman, Ingrid Tobiasson

=== 20th century ===
- 1999: Lena Nordin
- 1995: Anne Sofie von Otter, Birgitta Svendén
- 1994: Siv Wennberg
- 1992: Jerker Arvidson, Anita Soldh
- 1990: MariAnne Häggander, Björn Asker
- 1988: Britt Marie Aruhn, Elisabeth Erikson, Gösta Winbergh
- 1985: Håkan Hagegård, Laila Andersson-Palme
- 1983: Sylvia Lindenstrand, Bengt Rundgren
- 1978: Arne Tyrén
- 1976: Ragnar Ulfung, Edith Thallaug, Berit Lindholm
- 1973: Ingvar Wixell, Birgit Nordin-Arvidson, Carl-Axel Hallgren
- 1972: Alice Babs Sjöblom,
- 1968: Barbro Ericson-Hederén
- 1966: Margareta Hallin, Erik Saedén
- 1965: Nicolai Gedda
- 1963: Kerstin Meyer-Bexelius
- 1959: Elisabeth Söderström-Olow
- 1955: Birgit Nilsson
- 1952: Leon Björker
- 1946: Set Svanholm, Sigurd Björling
- 1944: Jussi Björling, Kerstin Thorborg
- 1943: Hjördis Schymberg, Joel Berglund
- 1942: Irma Björck, Einar Beyron
- 1941: Helga Görlin
- 1940: Brita Hertzberg-Beyron
- 1936: Karin Maria Branzell-Reinshagen, Gertrud Pålson-Wettergren
- 1933: Martin Öhman
- 1929: Åke Wallgren, David Stockman
- 1928: Marianne Mörner
- 1925: Nanny Larsén-Todsen
- 1923: Julia Claussen
- 1911: Sigrid Arnoldson-Fischof
- 1909: Signe Rappe-Weldén, John Forsell
- 1906: Arvid Ödmann

=== 19th century ===
- 1886: Mathilda Grabow
- 1854: Louise Michaëli
- 1847: Jenny Lind
- 1837: Mathilda Gelhaar
- 1837: Anna Sofia Sevelin
- 1837: Henriette Widerberg
- 1834: Mathilda Berwald
- 1831: Isak Albert Berg
- 1815: Jeanette Wässelius

=== 18th century ===
- 1788: Franziska Stading
- 1787: Kristofer Kristian Karsten
- 1773: Lovisa Augusti
- 1773: Carl Stenborg
- 1773: Elisabeth Olin

== See also ==
- Sophia Schröder
- Kungliga Hovkapellet
- Litteris et Artibus
- Kammersänger
