= Carolina Östberg =

Swedish opera singer

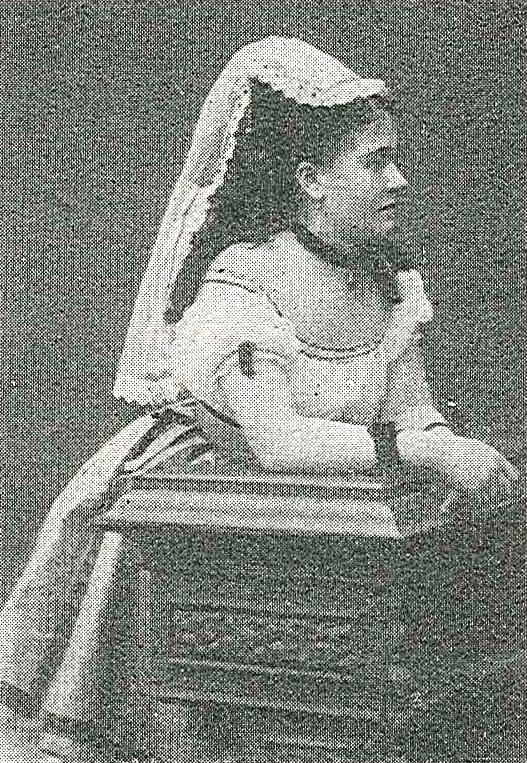
Carolina Östberg as Adina in L'elisir d'amore by Donizetti.

Carolina Östberg (17 May 1853 – 27 February 1924) was a Swedish opera singer and singing teacher. She was nationally and internationally famous and belonged to the elite members of the Royal Swedish Opera

== Life ==
Carolina Östberg was the daughter of the barber-surgeon Johan Ludvig Östberg and Beata Ulrika Wallberg. She displayed a natural musical talent at an early age. She was enrolled at the Royal Dramatic Training Academy from 1869 to 1873, and a student of Signe Hebbe. She was active as a concert singer before she made her debut Stora Teatern at the 1873–74 season with Louise Pyk. Both Östbeg and Pyk made a great success. She was given a contract at the Stora Teatern after her part as Carlo Broschi in Hälften var, a part which was to be her most popular.

When she retired after her marriage to the merchant Horwitz in 1877, she had become one of her country's most noted singers. When she was unexpectedly launched in the lead role of Boccaccio in Nya Teatern in 1879, "The applause never seemed to stop", and the press demanded that she be given a position at the Royal Swedish Opera. She performed in Copenhagen (1880), Germany (1882–83), Norway (1885), and Nya Teatern in Stockholm under the name Mrs Östberg.

In 1886, Östberg was employed at the Royal Swedish Opera. This was seen as the triumph of the audience over the operatic management: "The Public had had its will" over the opera, after having demanded that she be employed there for years. She stayed there for the remainder of her career, except for a tour of the United States in 1892–94. She was compared to Louise Michaeli. She was awarded the Litteris et Artibus medal in 1891, and again with brilliants in 1900. In 1897, she was inducted into the Royal Swedish Academy of Music. In 1905, she made nine gramophone recordings. She retired in 1906, and was later active as a singing teacher.

Among her parts were the title role of La Gioconda, Sieglinde in Die Walküre, Alice in Falstaff, Marguerite de Valois in Les Huguenots and the title role in Aida.
