= Ekerot =

Ekerot is a Swedish surname. Notable people with the surname include:

- Bengt Ekerot (1920–1971), Swedish actor and director
- David Ekerot (born 1970), Swedish tennis player
- Gunhild Margareta Hallin Ekerot (1931–2020), Swedish opera singer
