= Christina Nilsson (soprano, born 1990) =

Swedish opera singer

- Born: 6 June 1990 (age 36); Ystad, Scania, Sweden
- Education: University College of Opera
- Occupation: Operatic soprano

Christina Nilsson (born 6 June 1990) is a Swedish operatic soprano who has appeared at major opera houses and festivals. She was given the title Hovsångerska (Royal Court Singer) in October 2025 by His Majesty King Carl XVI Gustaf of Sweden.

== Life and career ==
Nilsson was born in Ystad on 6 June 1990. She moved to Stockholm to attend the Lilla Akademien Musikgymnasium focused on music. She studied voice at the University College of Opera, graduating in 2017.

Nilsson appeared at the Royal Swedish Opera in Stockholm first in the title role of Verdi's Aida in 2017, and then as the Countess in Mozart's Le nozze di Figaro, in the title roles of Puccini's Tosca and Ariadne auf Naxos by R. Strauss, and as Chrysothemis in Elektra (opera).

She performed as a guest at Oper Frankfurt, Deutsche Oper Berlin, the Royal Opera House in London, and the Bavarian State Opera, where she portrayed Rosalinde in Die Fledermaus by J. Strauss. She first appeared at the Bayreuth Festival in 2024, as Freia in Das Rheingold and Third Norne in Götterdämmerung. She first appeared at the Metropolitan Opera in New York City in 2025 as Aida, regarded as her signature role.

She sang Four Last Songs by R. Strauss at the Opéra national de Lorraine in Nancy.

Nilsson achieved both the First Prize and the Audience Prize of the Wilhelm Stenhammar International Competition in 2016, and the First Prize of the Renata Tebaldi International Voice Competition in 2017.

In October 2025, Christina Nilsson was given the title Hovsångerska (Royal Court Singer) by His Majesty King Carl XVI Gustaf of Sweden.
