= Malin Byström =

Swedish opera singer (born 1973)

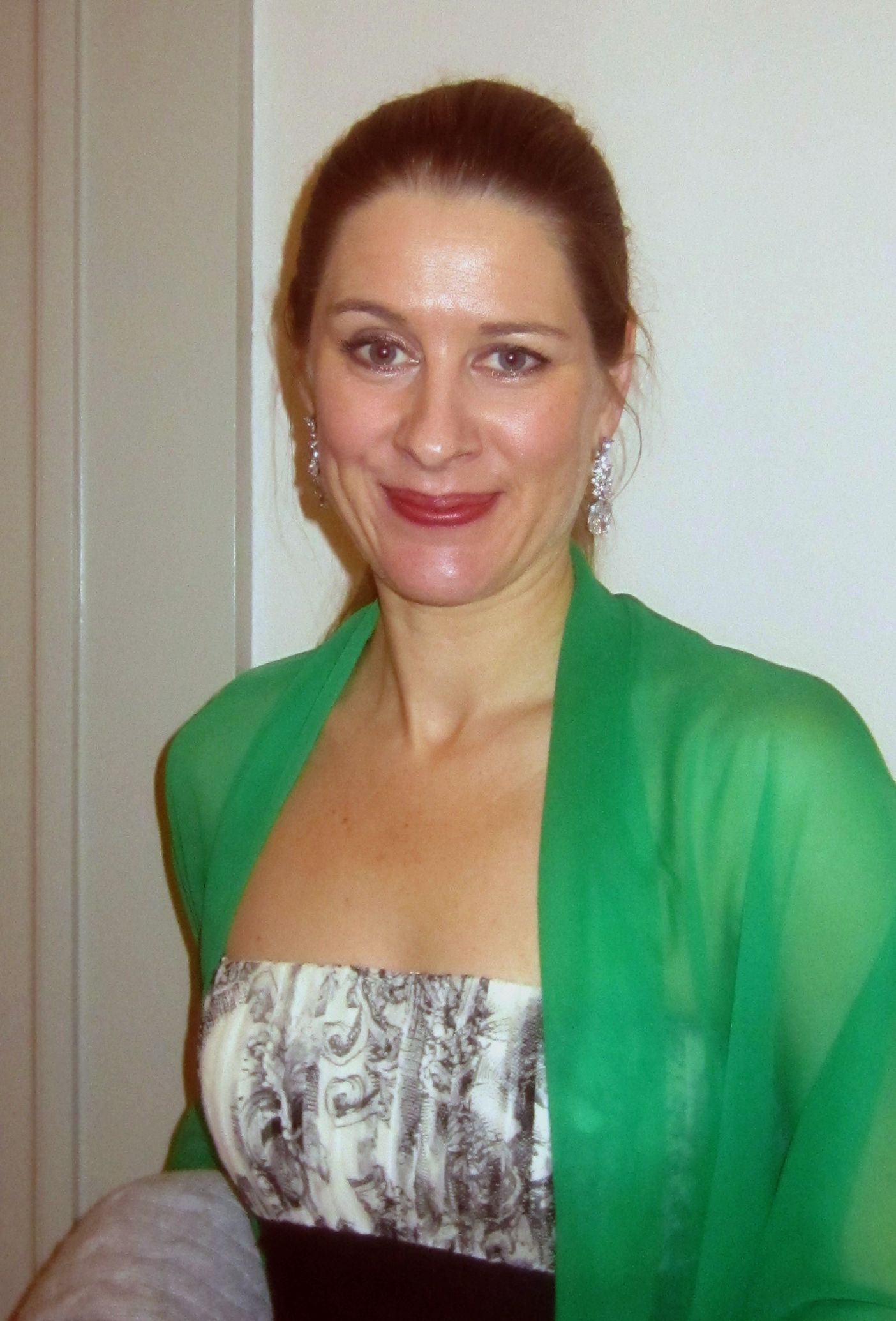
Malin Byström is a Swedish lyric soprano.

Malin Byström (Swedish: [ˈmɑ̌ːlɪn ˈbŷːstrœm]; born 3 September 1973) is a Swedish lyric soprano.

== Early life and education ==
Byström was born in Helsingborg. She studied at the Academy of Music and Drama, University of Gothenburg for four years and then trained as a soprano at University College of Opera, Stockholm.

== Career ==
Byström sang Fiorella in Il turco in Italia at the Theater Lübeck in 2000 and subsequently joined the ensemble of the opera in Nürnberg, singing the roles of Musetta in La Bohème, Gretel in Hänsel und Gretel, Gilda in Rigoletto, Annina in Eine Nacht in Venedig, and Pamina in Die Zauberflöte. She debuted at The Royal Opera as Amalia in I masnadieri in 2002 and has since sung Marguerite in Faust, Fiordiligi in Così fan tutte, and Donna Anna in Don Giovanni.

Byström has also appeared with the Bavarian State Opera, Munich and the Metropolitan Opera, New York. She has sung at the Salzburg Festival and the Aix-en-Provence Festival. Her opera debut in Sweden was not until autumn 2007, when she sang Marguerite in Gounod's Faust with the Gothenburg Opera.

In 2014, she sang the title role in Richard Strauss's Arabella, with the New York Times remarking that her voice "has silvery plush" and describing her as "elegant in both looks and tone, and sounding full and flexible...uncannily reminiscent of Kiri Te Kanawa".

Her repertoire includes the title role in Massenet's Thaïs, which she has sung at Palau de les Arts, Valencia, opposite Plácido Domingo, as well as three Mozart roles with Fiordiligi in Così fan tutte, the Countess in The Marriage of Figaro, Donna Anna in Don Giovanni, and Amelia in Verdi's Simon Boccanegra.

In 2012, Opera News in their review of Thaïs in Valencia wrote,

A svelte blonde with the grace of a dancer, Byström is a skilled actress who convincingly portrayed the character's transformation from sinner to saint. Her soprano voice is clear and powerful, with a unique color. Her top register still needs developing, but in this most difficult character, Byström showed considerable promise and proved a worthy partner to the formidable Domingo.

She sang the role of Jenny Lind in the 2020 film The Animated Story of Jenny Lind – A Swedish Nightingale.

== Honours and awards ==
Byström received a Jenny Lind scholarship in 1997, and a Birgit Nilsson scholarship in 2008. In 2016, she was awarded the Swedish Royal Medal Litteris et Artibus. She was awarded the title Hovsångerska, or Court Singer, by the King of Sweden in 2018. In 2018, she received the International Opera Awards for Female Singer of the Year. In 2024, she performed at the Nobel Prize Concert.

- 1997: Jenny Lind Scholarship
- 2008: Birgit Nilsson Scholarship
- 2016: Litteris et Artibus
- 2017: Prix d'Amis of the Friends of De Nationale Opera
- 2018: International Opera Awards
- 2018: Hovsångerska

== Personal life ==
She is married to the Swedish baritone Markus Schwartz. They live in Gothenburg and have two children.
