= Margareta Hallin =

Swedish opera soprano (1931–2020)

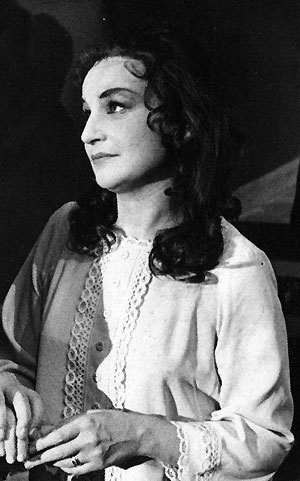
- Hallin as Gilda in Rigoletto at the Malmö City Theatre in 1968
- Born: Gunhild Margareta Hallin Ekerot; 20 February 1931; Karlskoga, Sweden
- Died: 9 February 2020 (aged 88); Vantör, Stockholm, Sweden
- Occupations: Opera soprano, composer, actress
- Years active: 1955–2020
- Spouse(s): Inge Boström (1951-1956); Bengt Ekerot

Gunhild Margareta Hallin Ekerot (20 February 1931 – 9 February 2020) was a Swedish opera singer, composer and actress.

== Early life and debut ==
Hallin was born on 20 February 1931, in Karlskoga. She made her debut during her time as a student at the University College of Opera (Note: University College of Opera was, at that time, part of the Royal Swedish Opera in Stockholm.) in 1955 as Rosina in Rossini's The Barber of Seville.

== Career ==
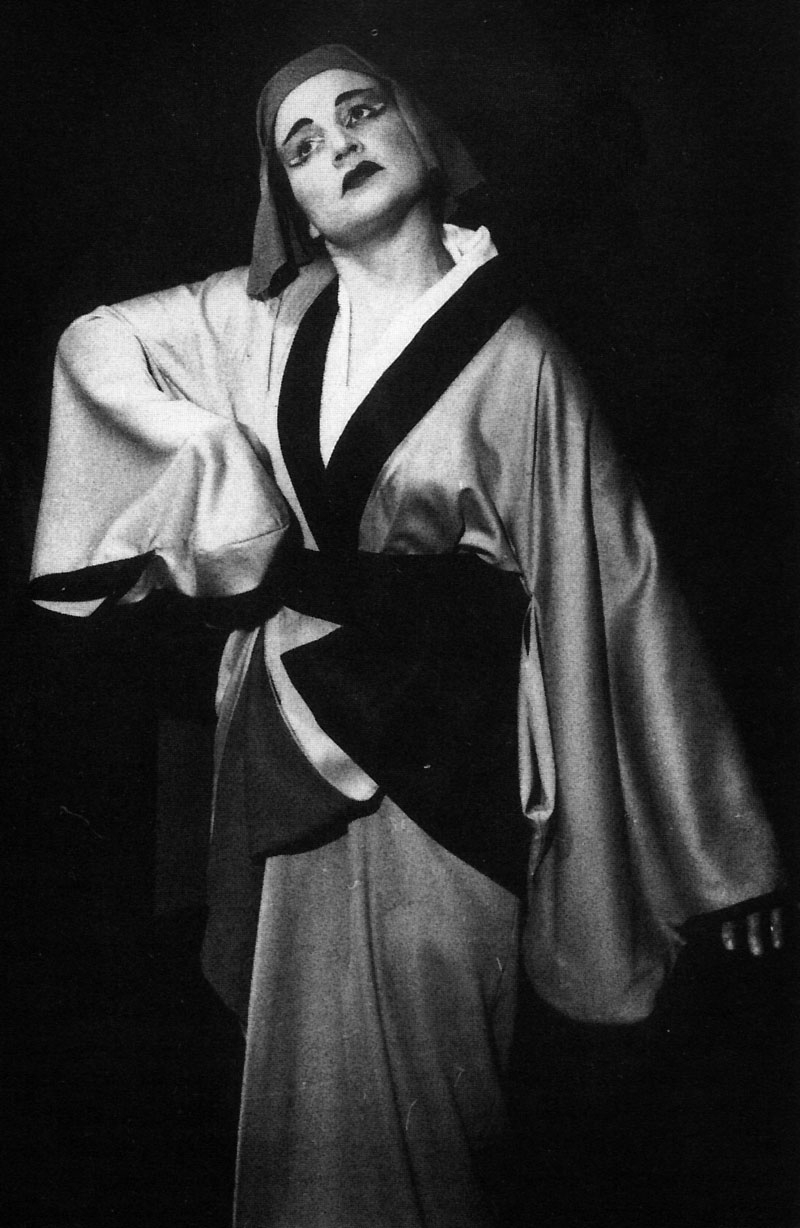
As Tsu in the opera Tranfjädrarna at Blancheteatern, 1958

Hallin joined the Royal Swedish Opera as a full-time employee in 1956, where she performed in roles such as Zerbinetta in Ariadne auf Naxos by Richard Strauss, the title role of Donizetti's Lucia di Lammermoor, Sophie in Der Rosenkavalier by Strauss, Leonora in Verdi's Il trovatore, Amelia in Un ballo in maschera, the title role in Aida, and Gilda in Rigoletto. Hallin was appointed Hovsångerska (Royal Court singer) along with Erik Saedén, in 1966, and was awarded the Jussi Björling Scholarship in 1970. Her last performance at the opera was in the title role of Cherubini's Médée.

Hallin's voice has been described as a coloratura soprano. She was considered to have the talent required for the international scene, but she chose to stay in Sweden.

Her opera roles in the 1950s to 1970s included the blind poetess in Karl-Birger Blomdahl's Aniara, Anne Trulove in Stravinsky's The Rake's Progress, the title role in Verdi's La traviata, Therese in Lars Johan Werle's Drömmen om Thérèse, and the Queen Mother in Georg Joseph Vogler's Gustaf Adolf och Ebba Brahe. Hallin also performed in Glyndebourne, Florence, Vienna, Hamburg, Moscow, London and Copenhagen, as well as making a tour in the Soviet Union.

In the mid-1980s, she started composing music. Encouraged by composer Eberhard Eyser, she made her debut in 1986 with poems set to music. The poems were by Nils Ferlin, Harry Martinson, Werner Aspenström and Alf Henrikson – she performed a medley of these in the Drottningholm Palace Church. She was elected as a member of the Swedish Society of Composers in 1990 and was awarded the honorary academic title of professors namn in 2001. In 2006, she received the Gunn Wållgren Award.

She set several works by August Strindberg to music, beginning with a chamber opera based on Fröken Julie (Miss Julie) in 1990. Miss Julie was staged at the Confidence Theatre in 1990, and restaged in 1994. Hallin also composed music for Strindberg's works Den Starkare (The Stronger) which was performed in the Rotunda at the Royal Opera in Stockholm in 1991, and Ett drömspel (A Dream Play) in 1992.

In Sundsvall in 2012, Hallin premiered a program, both read and sung, which she had composed based upon Strindberg's letters to Harriet Bosse. At its performance in Kramfors, the production was accompanied by a small exhibition of Hallin's paintings, including a portrait of Strindberg.

== Personal life ==
Hallin was married twice. Her first marriage was to violinist Inge Boström from 1951 to 1956. The couple had a daughter, born in 1952. Her second marriage was to Bengt Ekerot. Their son was born in 1966.

Hallin died on 9 February 2020,11 days before her 89th birthday, at the age of 88.

== Awards and titles ==
- 1966 – Hovsångerska (Swedish Court singer)
- 1969 – Kvällspostens Thaliapris
- 1970 – Jussi Björlingstipendiet
- 1972 – Member No. 769 at the Royal Swedish Academy of Music
- 1976 – Litteris et Artibus
- 1981 – Svenska grammofonpriset ("Swedish gramophone prize") for Gullebarn (with Rolf Lindblom, piano)
- 2004 – Hugo Alfvénpriset
- 2006 – Gunn Wållgren Award

== In plays ==
- 1997 – Shylock in Shakespeare's The Merchant of Venice, Säffleoperan
- 2007 – The Mummy, the Colonel's wife in Strindberg's The Ghost Sonata, Strindberg's Intimate Theater
- 2011 – Sjuksköterskan in a dramatization of Strindberg's novel Taklagsöl (Topping out Ceremony), Strindberg's Intimate Theater

== Discography ==
- Sex kvinnoporträtt ur operans värld ("Six portraits of women from the opera world"), solo performance with Norrköpings symfoniorkester, EMI His Master's Voice 4E 061–34616.
- Great Swedish Singers. Bluebell ABCD 060.
- Svenska hovsångerskor ("Swedish choir of court singers"). EMI CMCD 6350. Svensk mediedatabas.
- Lieder. Strauss, Mahler, Mozart. Margareta Hallin. Rolf Lindblom, piano. Proprius PRCD 9151. Svensk mediedatabas.
- Rigoletto as Gilda in Verdi's opera. Live recording. BIS CD-296. (2 CDs).
- Tranfjädrarna ("The Twilight Crane") as Tsu in Sven-Erik Bäck's opera. Norrköpings symfoniorkester. with Olle Sivall, Uno Ebréus. Kammarkören, cond. Eric Ericson. Swedish Society Disciofil. SLT 33183. Grammis Award.
