= Mathilda Grabow =

Swedish opera singer

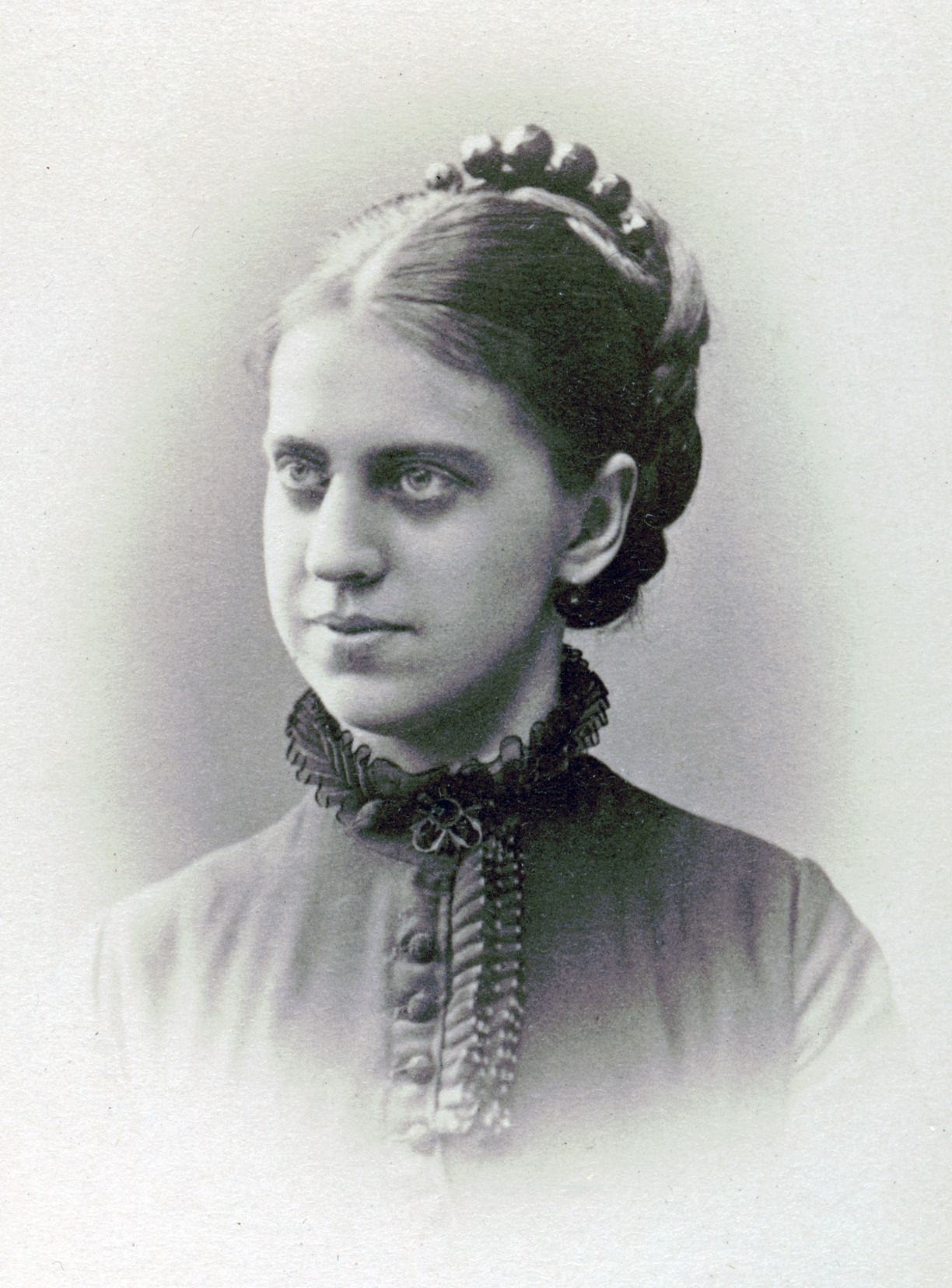
Mathilda Grabow

Mathilda Grabow (23 May 1852 – 29 May 1940), was a Swedish opera singer (soprano). She was a court singer (Hovsångare) (1886) and a member of the Royal Swedish Academy of Music (1895) and was given Litteris et Artibus (1895).

She was a student of Fredrika Stenhammar and Viardot and active at the Royal Swedish Opera in Stockholm in 1870–71 and 1877–86, and at the Opera Palais Garnier in Paris in 1872–76. She was described as a very versatile artist and considered one of the greatest stars within Swedish opera in the late 19th century. She retired in 1886 and was thereafter only active as a concert singer, except in 1891, when she performed in the last performance in the old building of the Stockholm opera, before the Royal Swedish Opera was moved to a new building.

She married the captain count C. E. Taube in 1886.
