= Katarina Dalayman =

Swedish singer (born 1963)

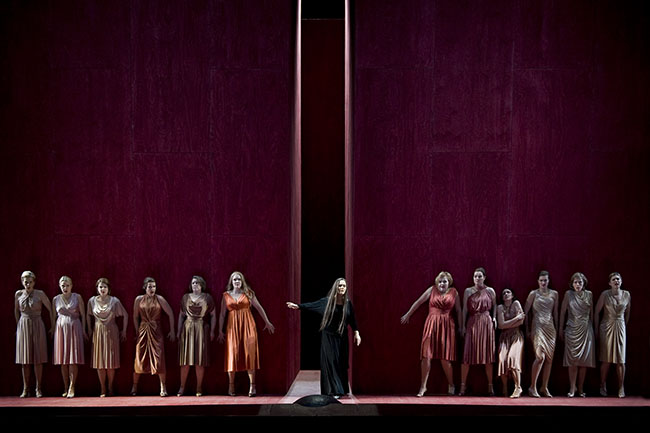
Dalayman as Elektra, Royal Swedish Opera, Stockholm 2009

Katarina Dalayman (born January 25, 1963, in Stockholm) is a Swedish former soprano who has transitioned into a mezzosoprano. She has received critical acclaim singing major operatic roles by composers such as Wagner, Berg, Shostakovich and Bartók, among others. In a 2005 interview, she commented that Wagner's music "[has] always been closest to my heart, always, since I started singing".

In 2000 she was made a Swedish Court Singer by His Majesty Carl XVI Gustaf, King of Sweden.

== Life and career ==
The daughter of a seamstress, who had herself previously considered a career in acting, Dalayman went on to become a student at the University College of Opera. Whilst still at college, she had already sung Sieglinde (from Wagner's Die Walküre) in public. Her debut was as Amelia in Verdi's Simon Boccanegra at the Royal Swedish Opera in 1991.

Since then, notable engagements have included Marie in Wozzeck at Stuttgart (1993), Metropolitan Opera (2001) and the Royal Opera House, Covent Garden (2001), Brangäne in Tristan und Isolde at New York Met (2002), Kundry in Parsifal at Paris Opera (2001) and Dresden (2008), Sieglinde at Covent Garden (2005), and Brünnhilde in the Stockholm Ring Cycle (2005-2008).

Later engagements included Brünnhilde in Aix en Provence (2008) and at the Metropolitan Opera (2009) and at the Osterfestspiele Salzburg (2009–10); Judith (Bluebeard's Castle) in the Gran Teatre del Liceu, Barcelona (2008); Isolde at the New York Met (2008); Brünnhilde; Kundry at the New York Met (2013).

After training as a mezzosoprano, she sang Fricka and Waltraute in the 2017 revival of Valdemar-Holm's Wagner Ring Cycle in Stockholm. At the beginning of 2018, she created a well-reviewed Klytaemnestra in the revival of Valdemar Holm's Elektra (the same production she sang the main role Elektra in 2009), also in Stockholm.

Dalayman's recordings include: Berg – Wozzeck (Marie), Berwald – Estrella de Soria (Zulma), Johan Hammerth – Stockholms Kantat, Korngold – Die Tote Stadt (Marie/Marietta), Wagner – Götterdämmerung (Brünnhilde), Wagner – Tristan und Isolde (Brangäne), and Wagner – Parsifal (Kundry).

Dalayman lives in Stockholm, Sweden, and has two sons.

== Awards ==
- 2000: appointed Hovsångerska by H.M. the King of Sweden
