= Anna Bergström-Simonsson =

Swedish voice teacher

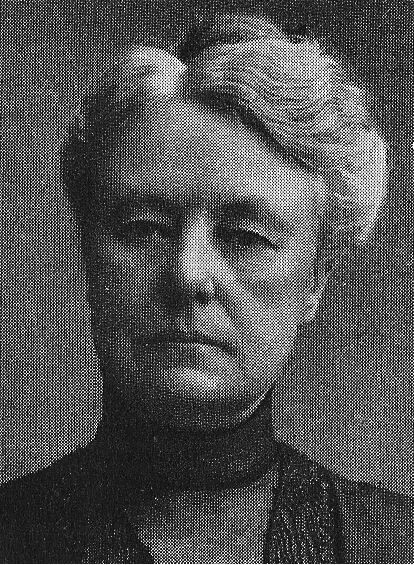
- Born: Färnebo, Värmland, Sweden; 30 December 1853
- Died: 30 January 1937 (aged 83); Stockholm, Sweden
- Occupations: Voice teacher, composer
- Spouse: Jonas Didrik Simonsson (m. 1916)

Anna Katarina Bergström-Simonsson (30 December 1853 – 30 January 1937) was a Swedish voice teacher who first taught in Swedish girls' schools and later at the Royal Seminary for Women in Stockholm. From 1903 to 1920, she was engaged by the Royal Conservatory, becoming a member of the Royal Swedish Academy of Music in 1912. In 1914, she was awarded the Litteris et Artibus for her services to Swedish culture.

== Biography ==
Born on 30 December 1853 in Färnebo near Filipstad, Värmland, Anna Katarina Bergström was the daughter of the industrialist and mine owner Olof Bergström and his wife Brita Katharina née Nilsson. She was one of the family's 11 children. From 1873 to 1876 she studied at the Royal Conservatory in Stockholm, graduating as an organist.

After studying under Charlotte von Scheele, she was a singing teacher from 1876 to 1880 in Filipstad, after which she taught in several other girls' schools in Stockholm, including the Brummer School. From 1897, she taught voice at the Royal Seminary for Women and from 1903 to 1920, she headed the test department at the Royal Conservatory. Thanks to a grant from the Royal Music Academy, she went on a number of study trips to the surrounding countries and attended the international school singing meeting in 1905 in Copenhagen. Bergström-Simonsson was widely recognized for her teaching methods at the Conservatory and the Seminary, receiving warm appreciation from her students for her enthusiasm.

In collaboration with the voice teacher at the Gothenburg teachers' training college Olof Holmberg, for a number of years she gave courses based on a systematic approach to singing teaching which was applied in Swedish schools by the folk school authorities. In 1914, she was awarded the Litteris et Artibus for her services to Swedish culture. In 1916 she married Jonas Didrik Simonsson, the director of the Gothenburg-Stockholm-Dalarna transport authority. She became a member of Nya Idun, a Swedish women's association, in 1899.

Anna Bergström-Simonsson lived at Strandvägen 35 in Stockholm, she died on 30 January 1937.

== Works ==
- Sångkurs för skolan: systematiskt ordnad. Vol. 1, Gehörsång. Stockholm. 1897. OCLC 936695184.
- Sångkurs för skolan: systematiskt ordnad. Vol. 2, Tonträffningskurs efter formelmetoden. Stockholm. 1910. OCLC 671741977.
- Sångkurs för skolan: systematiskt ordnad. Vol. 3, Tonträffningskurs efter formelmetoden. Stockholm. 1910. OCLC 671741984.
- Taltekniska övningar. Stockholm: Norstedts förlag. 1917. OCLC 186730077.
