= Ida von Schulzenheim =

Swedish artist (1859–1940)

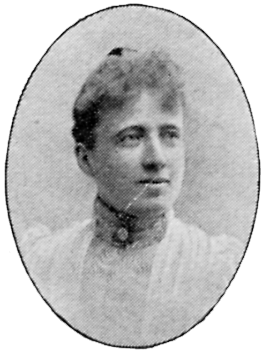
- Born: 8 January 1859; Stora Skedvi, Sweden
- Died: 24 April 1940 (aged 81); Stockholm, Sweden
- Known for: Painting

Ida Eléonora Davida von Schulzenheim (1859–1940) was a Swedish painter. Her foremost motif was paintings of animals.

== Biography ==
Ida von Schulzenheim was born 8 January 1859 in Stora Skedvi to landowner baron David T. von Schulzenheim and Ida Sophia Cederborgh. She studied at the Royal Swedish Academy of Arts, and from 1888 in Paris under Julien Dupré, Jules Joseph Lefebvre and Benjamin Constant. She was given an honorary mention at the world's exhibit in Paris 1889, a silver medal in Amiens in 1890, a gold medal in Stockholm in 1891, an honorary mention in Paris in 1892.

von Schulzenheim exhibited her work at the Palace of Fine Arts at the 1893 World's Columbian Exposition in Chicago, Illinois.

Von Schulzenheim was the founder of Föreningen Svenska Konstnärinnor ('Society of Swedish Female Artists') in 1910. She also served as its first chairperson. She founded the society to give female artists, who she felt were discriminated against and not given as much attention and opportunities as their male colleagues, a better possibility to be known and appreciated for their art, and not to actually draw attention to their gender as such:

"You do not actually think, that we female artists would wish to become known merely for being women? I mean, would we wish to exhibit by ourselves, unless we were forced to?"

Ida von Schulzenheim was given the Litteris et Artibus in 1927. She died on 24 April 1940 in Stockholm.

== Gallery ==
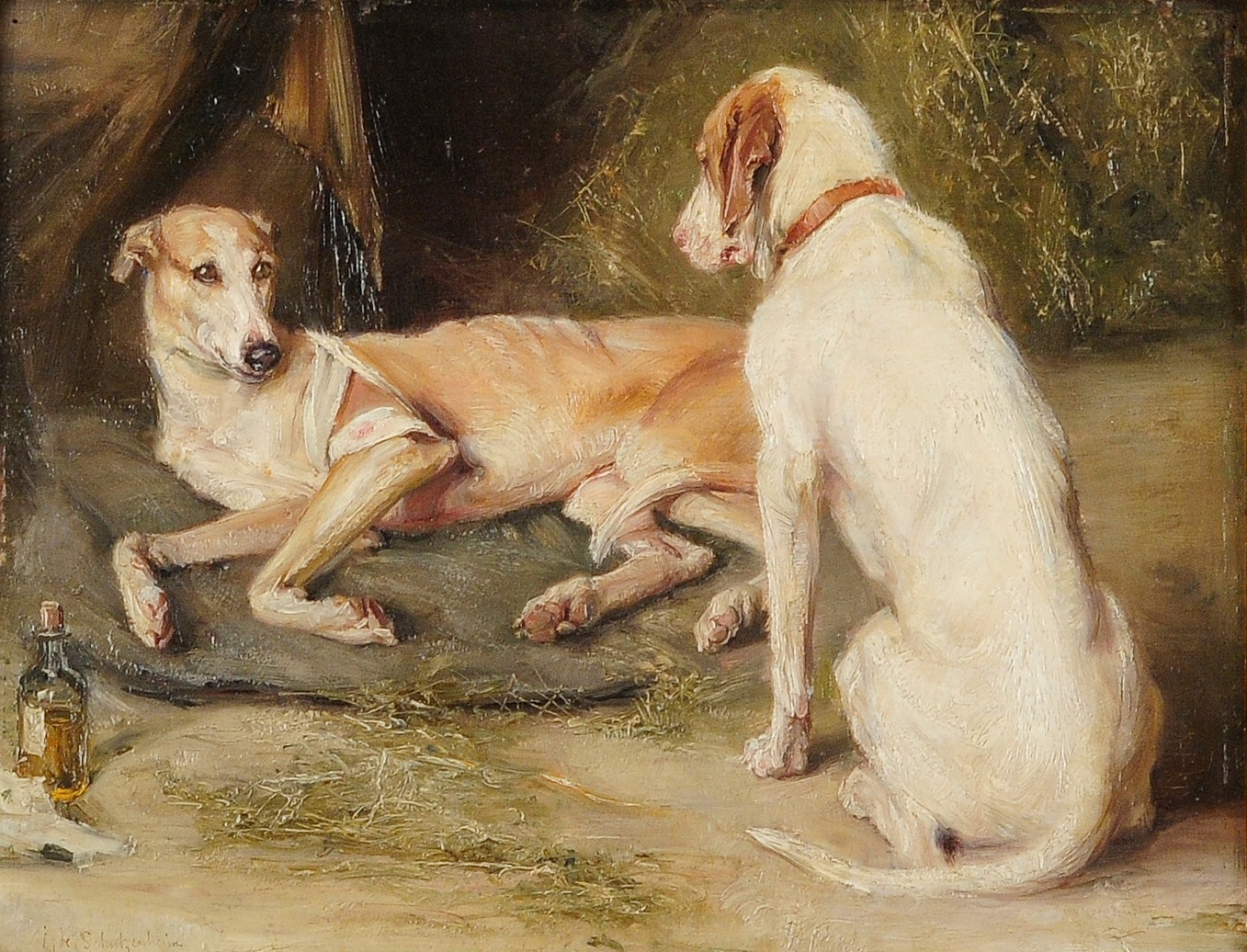
Dogs
