= Maria Mogensen =

Danish curator and Egyptologist (1882–1932)

- Born: Maria Pouline Mogensen; 1 October 1882; Copenhagen, Denmark
- Died: 31 October 1932 (aged 50); Copenhagen, Denmark
- Occupations: Curator; Egyptologist
- Employer: Ny Carlsberg Glyptotek
- Awards: Litteris et Artibus, 1919

Maria Pouline Mogensen (1 October 1882 – 31 October 1932) was a Danish curator and Egyptologist. The first Danish female Egyptologist, Mogensen played a major role in the development of the Egyptian collection at the Ny Carlsberg Glyptotek.

== Early life and education ==
Mogensen was born on 1 October 1882 in Copenhagen to Niels Mogensen (1848–1916), a machinist, and Marie Vilhelmine Emilie Dohn (1857–1882). The youngest of three siblings, Mogensen's mother died when she was 3 months old. Mogensen attended gymnasium however, anxiety caused her to leave school without obtaining her studentereksamen.

Mogensen was interested in Egyptology from a young age. In 1906, aged 24, Mogensen attended a lecture in Egyptology by Valdemar Schmidt (1836–1925). With encouragement from Schmidt, Mogensen informally attended Schmidt's lectures at the University of Copenhagen during 1906 to 1908. Mogensen continued her informal Egyptology education with H.O. Lange from 1908 to 1918.

== Career ==
In 1910, Mogense was employed as Schmidt's assistant at the Ny Carlsberg Glyptotek. As Schmidt's assistant Mogensen helped purchase Egyptian antiquities from auctions and from the excavations of Flinders Petrie.

In 1919, Mogensen published a French and Swedish-language catalogue of the Nationalmuseums Egyptian Collection. The same year Mogensen received the Litteris et Artibus. Between 1921 and 1922 Mogensen travelled across Egypt.

Following Schmidt's death in 1925, Mogensen was appointed curator in 1926. Mogensen played a major role in the development of the Egyptian collection and the use of preservation practices.

On 31 October 1932 Mogensen died in Copenhagen aged 50.

== Publications ==
- Mogensen, Maria (1918). Inscriptions hiéroglyphiques du Musée national de Copenhague (in French). Copenhagen: A.F. Höst.
- Nationalmuseum; Mogensen, Maria (1919). Stèles Égyptiennes Au Musée National De Stockholm (in French). Copenhagen: A.F. Höst.
- Nationalmuseum; Mogensen, Maria (1919). Vägledning i den Egyptiska Samlingen (in Swedish).
- Mogensen, Maria (1921). Le Mastaba égyptien de la Glyptothèque Ny Carlsberg (in French). Copenhagen: Gyldendal.
- Mogensen, Maria (1930). Katalog over den ægyptiske Samling på Ny Carlsberg Glyptothek med Album (in Danish).
- Ny Carlsberg Glyptotek; Mogensen, Maria (1930). La Glyptothèque Ny Carlsberg: la colleciton égyptienne, par Maria Mogensen (in French). Copenhagen: Imprimerie de la cour royale du Danemark, F. Bagge.
