= Miah Persson =

Swedish opera singer (born 1969)

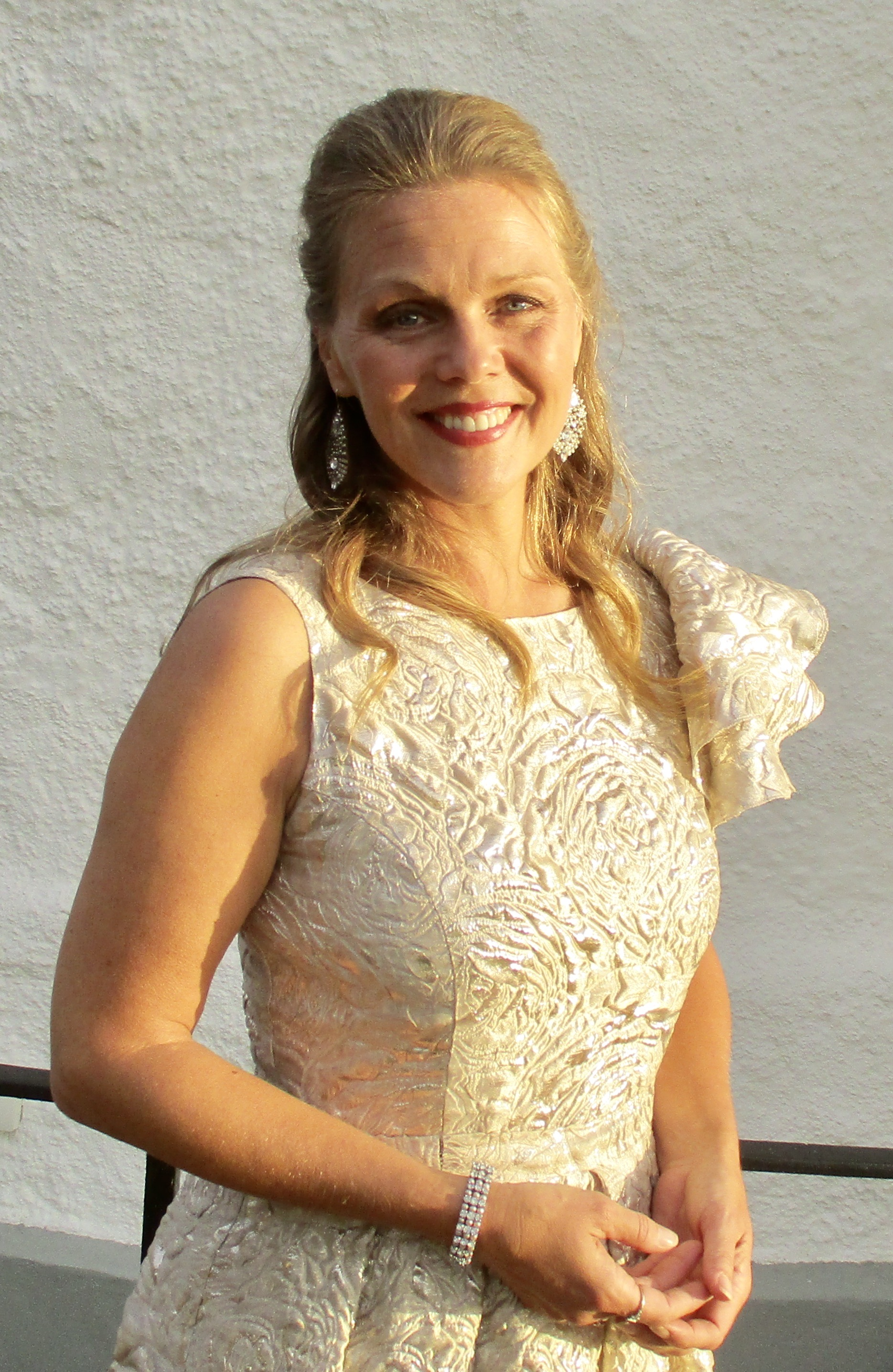
- Miah Persson in 2021

Background information
- Born: 27 May 1969 (age 55); Örnsköldsvik, Sweden
- Occupation: soprano singer

Miah Persson (born 27 May 1969 in Örnsköldsvik) is a Swedish soprano, active internationally and in recordings.

== Career ==
Miah Persson grew up in Hudiksvall, singing in choirs and taking part in amateur drama productions. After studying social sciences and law at university in Stockholm, she undertook musical studies at the Kulturama, Operastudio 67 and, from 1996, at the University College of Opera also in Stockholm.

She made her operatic debut as Susanna in Le nozze di Figaro at Confidencen in 1998.

As a member of the Royal Swedish Opera her roles have included Barbarina and Susanna in Le nozze di Figaro, Pamina in The Magic Flute (Mozart), Sandrina in La finta giardiniera, Dorinda in Orlando (Handel), Tebaldo in Don Carlos (Verdi), Frasquita in Carmen (Bizet), Gabrielle in La Vie parisienne (Offenbach), Gretel in Hansel und Gretel (Humperdinck) and Sophie in Der Rosenkavalier (Richard Strauss).

In addition to these roles, at other opera houses Miah Persson has sung Brigida in Cimarosa's Gli sposi per accidenti (Studio Lirico, Cortina, Italy), Hero in Berlioz's Béatrice et Bénédict (Théâtre des Champs-Elysées, Paris and Baden-Baden), Costanza in Scarlatti's La Griselda (Staatsoper, Berlin), Nannetta in Verdi’s Falstaff (Aix-en-Provence), and Governess in Britten's The Turn of the Screw (Frankfurt). Other recent roles include Arianna in Creta in 2009, and in 2010 she sang her first Anne Trulove at Glyndebourne.

She made her concert debut at the Salzburg Festival in 2003 and her operatic debut there in 2004 (Sophie in Der Rosenkavalier) and returned in 2005 (Sifare in Mitridate).

Her Royal Opera House Covent Garden debut was in 2006 (Susanna) and the same year at Glyndebourne Festival sang Fiordiligi in Così fan tutte. In 2009 she made her Metropolitan Opera debut as Sophie in Der Rosenkavalier. She has also appeared with the London Gabrieli Consort and Players and at the Carnegie Hall New York, San Francisco Opera, the Los Angeles Philharmonic Orchestra and the Chicago Symphony Orchestra.

At the Proms she has sung in the Brahms' Requiem, Così fan tutte and Mahler's Symphony No. 2, and has also given song recitals at the Wigmore Hall in London. Her broadcasts on Swedish Radio include Britten's Les Illuminations, songs by Grieg and Sibelius, songs and arias by Mozart, and Respighi's Christmas Cantata.

She created the role of the woman in Blank Out by Michel van der Aa at the Muziekgebouw in Amsterdam in March 2016, alongside Roderick Williams. In 2018 Persson sang her first Countess Madeleine in Capriccio at Garsington, and followed this in June 2021 with her first Marschallin in Rosenkavalier, one critic commending her "moments of self-reflection" and "burnished quality of old gold in the lyrical passages, with plenty of stamina for the taxing high lines of the Act 3 trio" and felt that "she recalls the great Viennese Marschallins of the 1950s, most of them, like her, graduates from Sophie.

== Personal life ==
Persson's husband is Jeremy Ovenden, a tenor. They have a daughter and a son.

== Awards ==
- 2010: appointed Hovsångerska by H.M. the King of Sweden

== Recordings ==
Miah Persson's discography includes Mahler Symphony No. 4 with Ivan Fischer and the Budapest Festival Orchestra, Mozart Mass in C minor KV427, Le nozze di Figaro, Cosi Fan Tutte, Mitridate, Rossini songs, Haydn's The Creation and The Seasons, the Requiems of Fauré and Duruflé, Handel's Rinaldo, Bach Magnificat and Cantatas BMV 105, 179 & 186, Michael Haydn Sancti Hieronymi, Fernström's Songs of the sea, and songs by Rangström, Stenhammar, Sjögren, Nystroem.
