= Elin Rombo =

Swedish operatic soprano (born 1976)

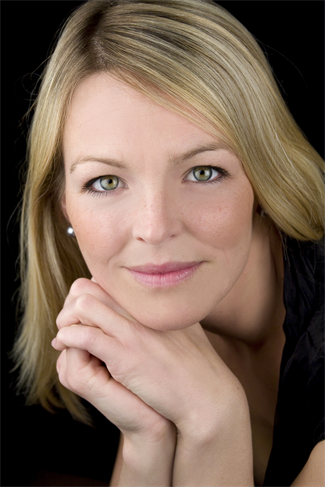
- Rombo in 2013
- Born: 29 January 1976 (age 50); Katrineholm, Sweden
- Occupation: Operatic soprano

Eva Elin Rombo (née Karlsson; born 29 January 1976) is a Swedish operatic soprano. In November 2013 she was named Hovsångerska.

== Biography ==
Rombo grew up in a musical family in Katrineholm and studied at the esthetics program at De Geergymnasiet in Norrköping. She then continued her education in Canada at Brandon University, and at the University College of Opera in Stockholm where she graduated in 2003. During her studies, she made her stage debut at the Royal Swedish Opera in Stockholm as Christa in Janáčeks The Makropulos Affair.

After graduation, she had the female lead role as Ingrid in Lars-Åke Franke-Blom's 2004 opera after Selma Lagerlöf's novel The Tale of a Manor (En herrgårdssägen) at Wermland Opera, and as Euridice in Offenbach's Orpheus in the Underworld at the Folkoperan. At the Royal Swedish Opera, she performed as Barbarina and Susanna in Mozart's Le nozze di Figaro, the First Lady in his Die Zauberflöte, Frasquita in Bizet's Carmen, Sister Blanche in Poulenc's Dialogues of the Carmelites, Musette in Puccini's La bohème, and Donna Elivra in Mozart's Don Giovanni.

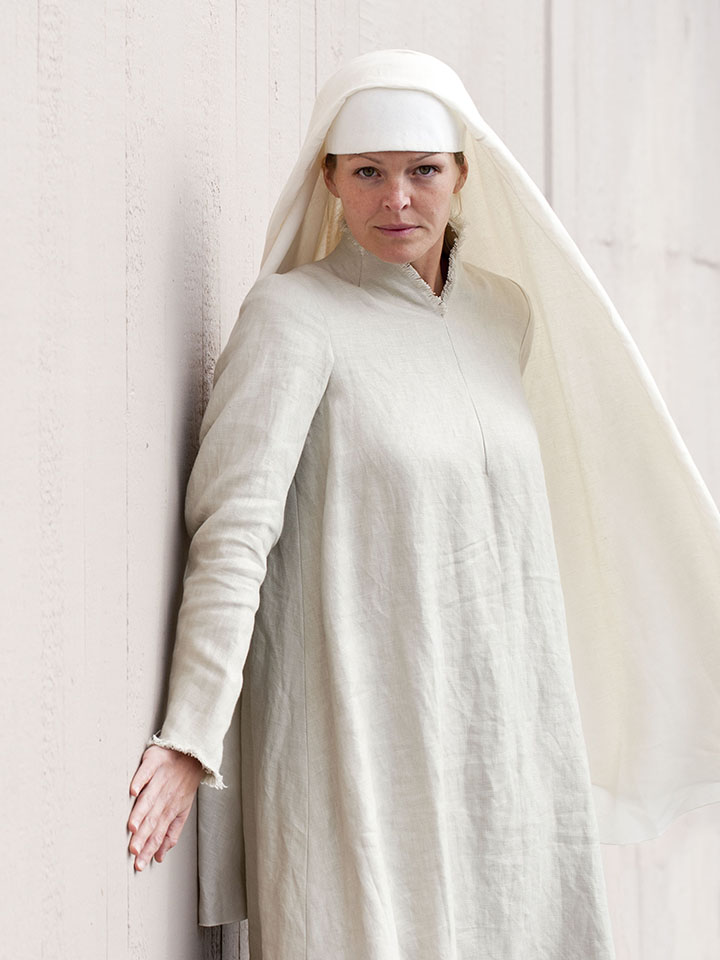
Rombo as Sister Blanche in Poulenc's Dialogues of the Carmelites

Rombo performed several roles at the Frankfurt Opera, among others as Servilia in Mozart's La clemenza di Tito, Clorinda in Rossini's La Cenerentola, Pamina in Die Zauberflöte and Corinna in Rossini's Il viaggio a Reims. In the summer of 2009, she made her debut at the Salzburg Festival in the lead role of Luigi Nono's Al gran sole carico d'amore. She then worked at the Berlin State Opera in Bernstein's Candide.

In 2010, she was a soloist in Brahms' A German Requiem with the Chicago Symphony Orchestra. She had the lead role as Agnès in George Benjamin's Written on Skin at the Dutch National Opera in Amsterdam. Rombo performed in SVT's broadcast of the christenings of Princess Estelle and Prince Oscar and at the jubilee concert for the celebration of King Carl Gustaf's 40 years on the Swedish throne.

She also performed at the 2014 Polar Music Prize. Rombo played Sister Blanche in Poulenc's Dialogues of the Carmelites in a 2011 production at the Royal Swedish Opera.

In 2010, Rombo became the first person to receive the Schymberg Scholarship award, a scholarship established in memory of Hjördis Schymberg. The scholarship included a prize of 25,000 Swedish krona.

== Discography ==
- Title role in Johann Strauss' operetta Fürstin Ninetta, Stockholm Strauss Orchestra conducted by Valéria Csányi. Naxos 8.660227-28. (2 CDs).
- 2nd high soprano in Wolfgang Rihm's Dionysos, Deutsches Symphonie-Orchester Berlin conducted by Ingo Metzmacher. DVD. Euro Arts 2072608.
