= Anna Larsson (contralto) =

Swedish contralto (born 1966)

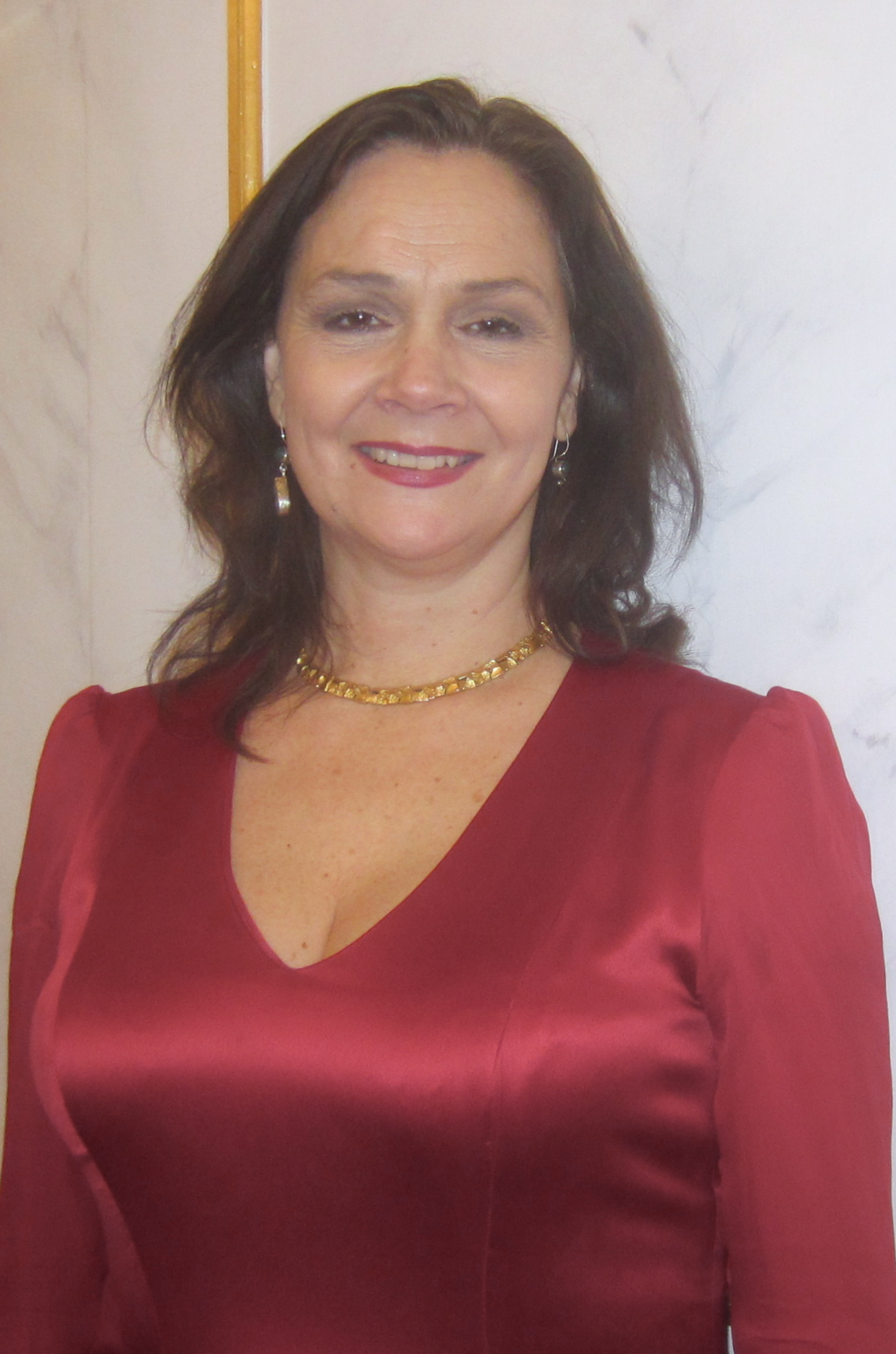
Larsson in 2015

Anna Larsson (born 10 September 1966) is a Swedish contralto. As a student she attended the Adolf Fredrik's Music School in Stockholm. Her international debut was made with the Berlin Philharmonic and the conductor Claudio Abbado in a performance of Gustav Mahler's Symphony No. 2 in 1997. In 2005 received a Grammy nomination for her recording of Richard Strauss Daphne together with WDR Symphony Orchestra Cologne conducted by Semyon Bychkov.

In 2010, she was appointed Hovsångerska (i.e. ’courtsinger’ - cf. ’Kammersänger/in’ in Austria) by Carl XVI Gustaf of Sweden
