= Louise Michaëli =

Swedish operatic singer (1830-1875)

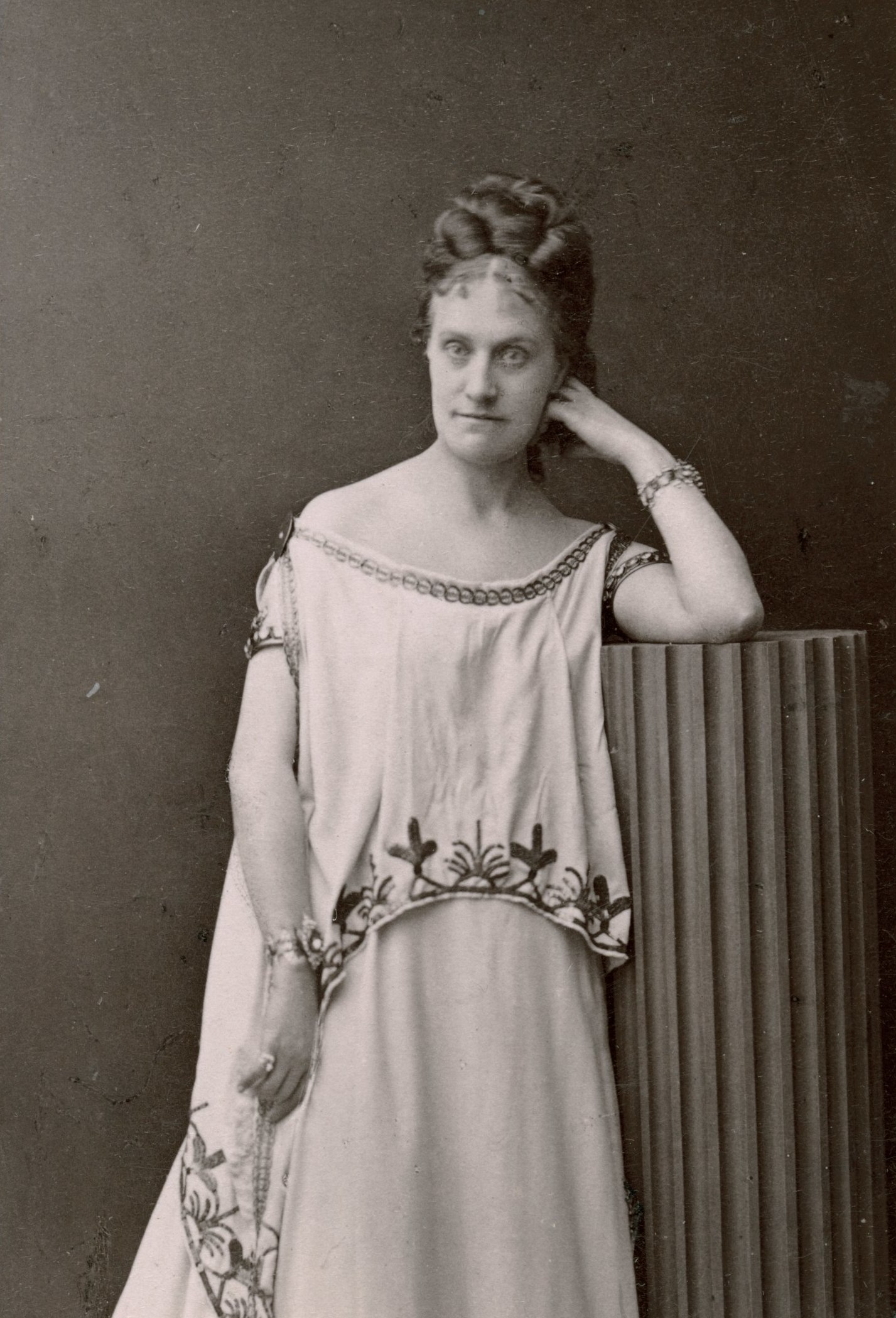
Louise Michaëli, 1871

Louise Charlotte Helene Michaëli, née Michal (17 May 1830 – 23 February 1875), was a Swedish opera singer.

Michaëli made her debut at the Royal Swedish Opera in 1849. She studied under Julius Günther at the Opera in Stockholm and under Garcia in London. From 1852 to 1855, she was employed at the Opera in Stockholm. She toured Scandinavia, Germany, the Netherlands and London from 1855 to 1856. From 1859 to 1863, she was employed at Her Majesty's Theatre in London. On her return to Sweden, she became the leading prima donna of the Royal Opera in Stockholm alongside Signe Hebbe and Fredrika Stenhammar until 1874. She was appointed court singer and inducted to Royal Swedish Academy of Music in 1854, and given the Litteris et Artibus in 1869. She married the merchant Charles Michaëli. Her husband and daughter died in 1871, and she died of tuberculosis in 1875.
