= Stockholm University of the Arts =

Swedish public university

- Stockholms konstnärliga högskola
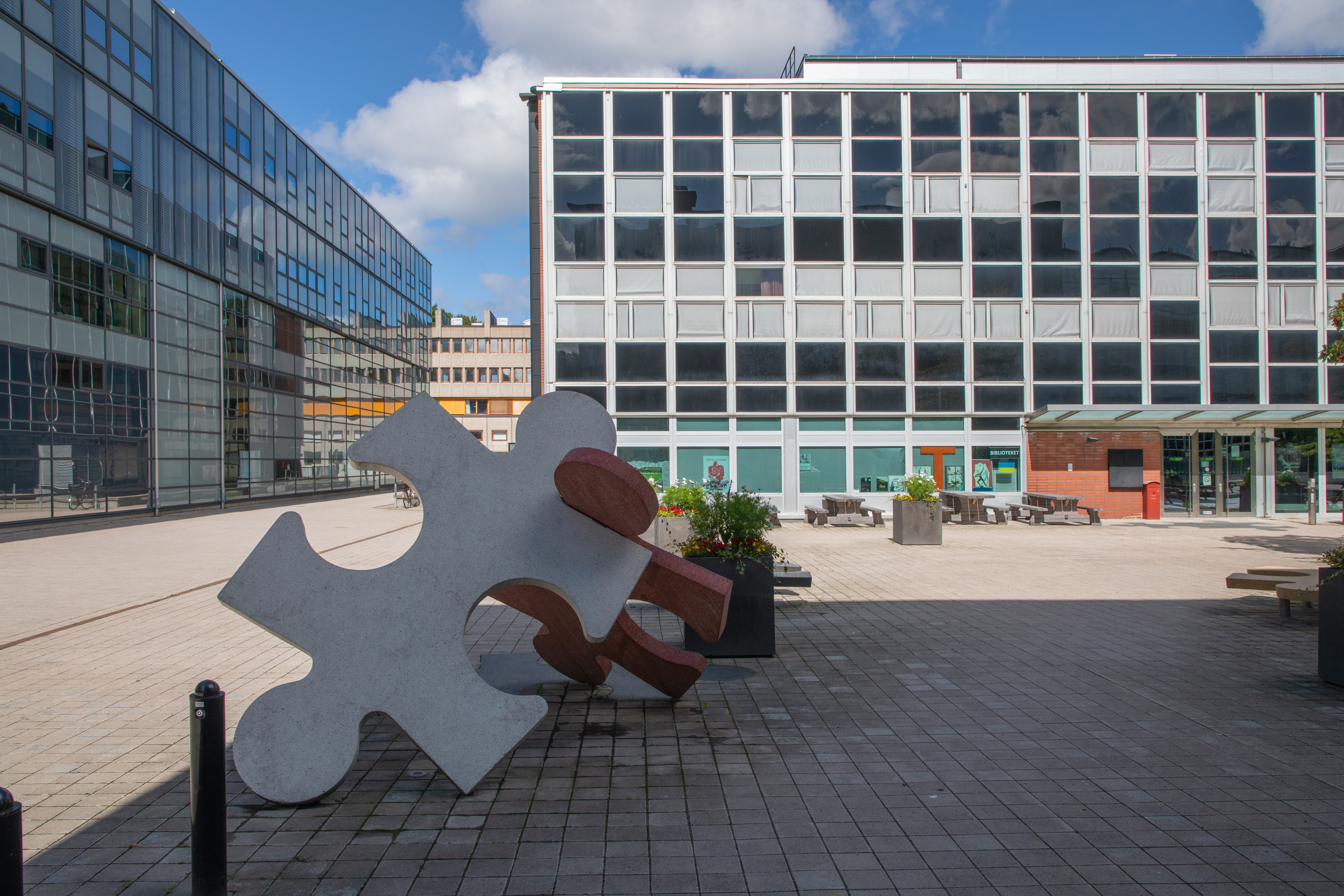
- Stockholm University of the Arts' administration and part of its educational facilities are located on Valhallavägen in Stockholm.
- Type: Public university college
- Established: January 1, 2014
- Affiliations: European League of Institutes of the Arts
- Vice-Chancellor: Ellen Røed
- Academic staff: 193 (2025)
- Students: 434 (2025)
- Doctoral students: 26 (2025)
- Location: Stockholm, Sweden
- Website: https://www.skh.se/english/

Stockholm University of the Arts (SKH) (Swedish: Stockholms konstnärliga högskola) is a Swedish public university college that conducts education and research in circus, dance, film and media, opera, and theatre. The university was established in 2014 through the merger of the School of Dance and Circus, the University College of Opera and the Stockholm Academy of Dramatic Arts. Parts of the university college consist of Stockholm's oldest performing arts education programmes, founded during the reign of Gustav III. The university places a strong emphasis on artistic research, and the creation of artistic doctoral studies in Stockholm was one of the principal motivations behind the establishment of SKH.

The university college is currently spread across five different addresses in Östermalm and Gärdet in Stockholm. From 2030, the university is planning to move all activities into a new building in the Slakthusområdet area.

== History ==
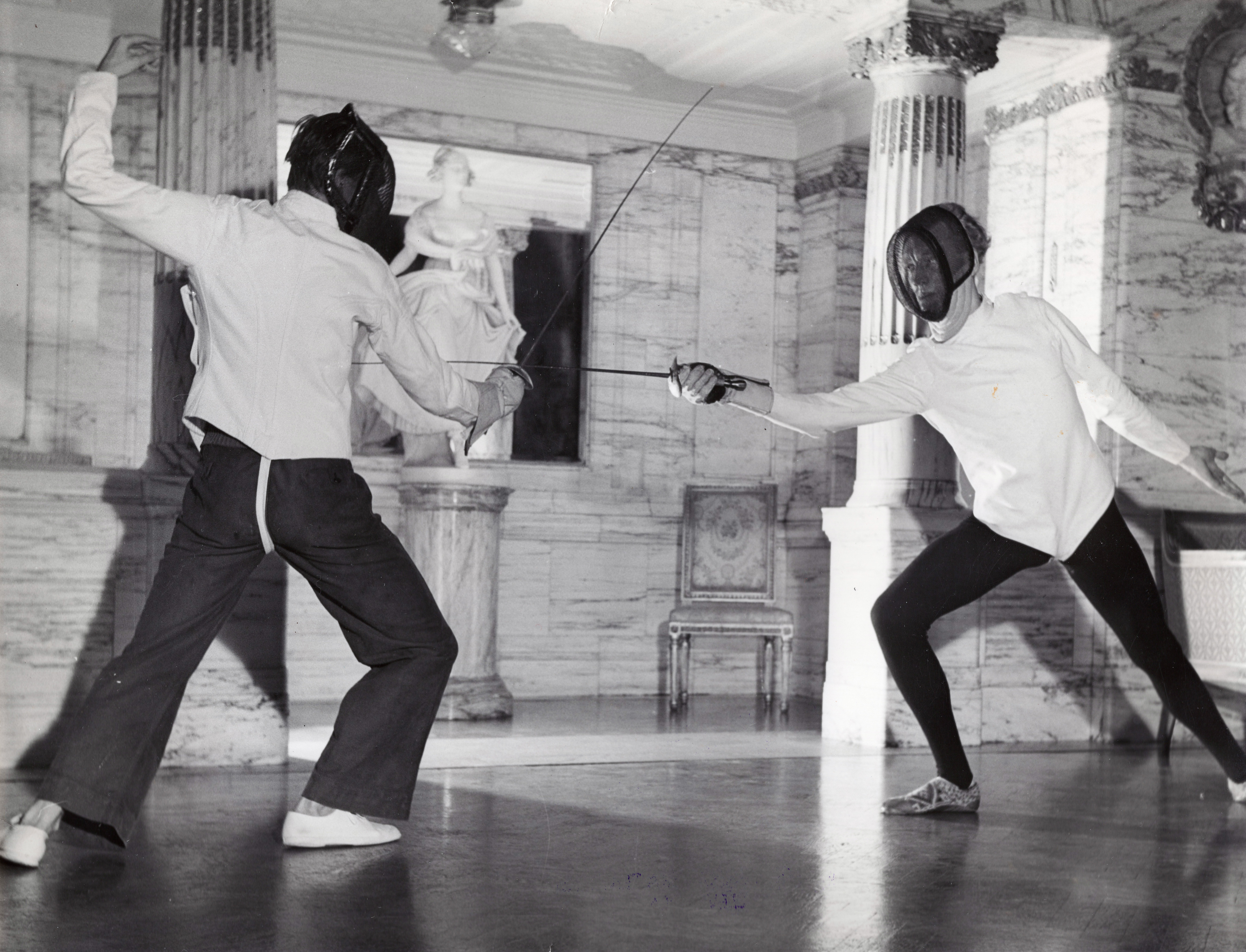
Max von Sydow, right, fencing with Jan-Olof Strandberg during the 1949–50 academic year at the Royal Dramatic Training Academy. Photo: Sven Gillsäter

When Gustav III had the Royal Swedish Opera established in 1773 and the Royal Dramatic Theatre in 1787, training programmes in opera singing and acting were also established at the two theatres. While opera training later was moved to the Royal Swedish Academy of Music, the acting programme at the Royal Dramatic Theate, known as the Royal Dramatic Training Academy, remained Sweden's most important institution for actor training well into the twentieth century.

During the 1960s and 1970s, a series of reforms transformed higher arts education in Stockholm. The Institute of Choreography, which provided education in contemporary choreography and dance pedagogy, was established in 1963 as an experimental programme under the Royal Swedish Academy of Music and was subsequently reorganised as the independent public authority the National School of Ballet Dancing (later the School of Dance and Circus) in 1970. The Dramaten acting school was nationalised in 1964 under the name National School of Acting (later the Swedish National Academy of Mime and Acting). The same year, the Swedish Film Institute established the Film School, which in 1970 was replaced by the publicly owned Swedish Institute of Dramatic Art, in which theatre-related programmes were also established.

Finally, opera education was also separated into an independent public authority, the National Musico-Dramatic School (later the University College of Opera), in 1968. These four public arts academies were transformed into university colleges as part of the 1977 reform of higher education in Sweden.

=== Merger and aftermath ===
The large number of arts higher education institutions present in Stockholm gave rise on a number of occasions to proposals of organisational consolidation. For example, during the 1970s there were advanced plans to merge what were Stockholm's then eight arts colleges into a single institution. (Note: The 1968 Higher Education Report (U 68) proposed incorporating arts education into Stockholm University. A corresponding reform was later implemented for the arts colleges in Gothenburg and Malmö, which today form part of the University of Gothenburg and Lund University, respectively. The Ministry of Education's review of U 68 (DsU 1974:6) instead proposed a smaller number of separate institutions. The National Board of Universities and Colleges subsequently proposed (HS 75-S) that all arts colleges in Stockholm – aside from the four mentioned above, also the Royal Institute of Art, the Royal College of Music, Konstfack, and the already merged Graphic Institute–Stockholm Institute of Advertising – should be merged together. Strong opposition from several institutions and their student organisations resulted in the plans being abandoned.) During the 1990s, a government inquiry proposed relocating all arts colleges to an "Arts Campus" adjacent to Konstfack on Valhallavägen, followed by a second inquiry examining institutional merger. In the 2000s, evaluations by both the Swedish National Agency for Higher Education and the Swedish Research Council also recommended consolidation.

In 2011, the Swedish National Academy of Mime and Acting and Swedish Institute of Dramatic Art merged to form Stockholm Academy of Dramatic Arts, following an initiative taken by the institutions themselves. In August of the same year, Stockholm's now six arts colleges submitted a memorandum to the Ministry of Education proposing the creation of a centre for artistic research. Instead, they received a counterproposal calling for a merger of the institutions. The proposal was welcomed by the School of Dance and Circus, University College of Opera and Stockholm Academy of Dramatic Arts, with the argument that it would create the conditions necessary for a shared programme of artistic doctoral education. The remaining arts colleges chose not to be part. In 2012, the Swedish government appointed a committee to establish the organisational structure of the new institution.

Stockholm University of the Arts was formally established on 1 January 2014. The government appointed the British–Norwegian professor Paula Crabtree as its first vice-chancellor. In June 2016, SKH received the right to award the degree of Doctor of Philosophy in the Arts, becoming the first independent arts university college in Sweden to receive such degree-awarding powers. (Note: University of Gothenburg, Lund University and University of Borås received degree-awarding powers for doctoral degrees in the arts in 2008. However, their artistic research fields formed only part of a larger university environment already awarding scientific doctoral degrees.) Both education and research subsequently underwent a series of organisational reforms. Initially, the predecessor institutions remained as separate organisational units, but they were later dissolved and replaced by two departments operating across the former institutional boundaries.

In August 2024, Paula Crabtree's term ended and she was succeeded as vice-chancellor by Professor Ellen Røed.

== Education ==
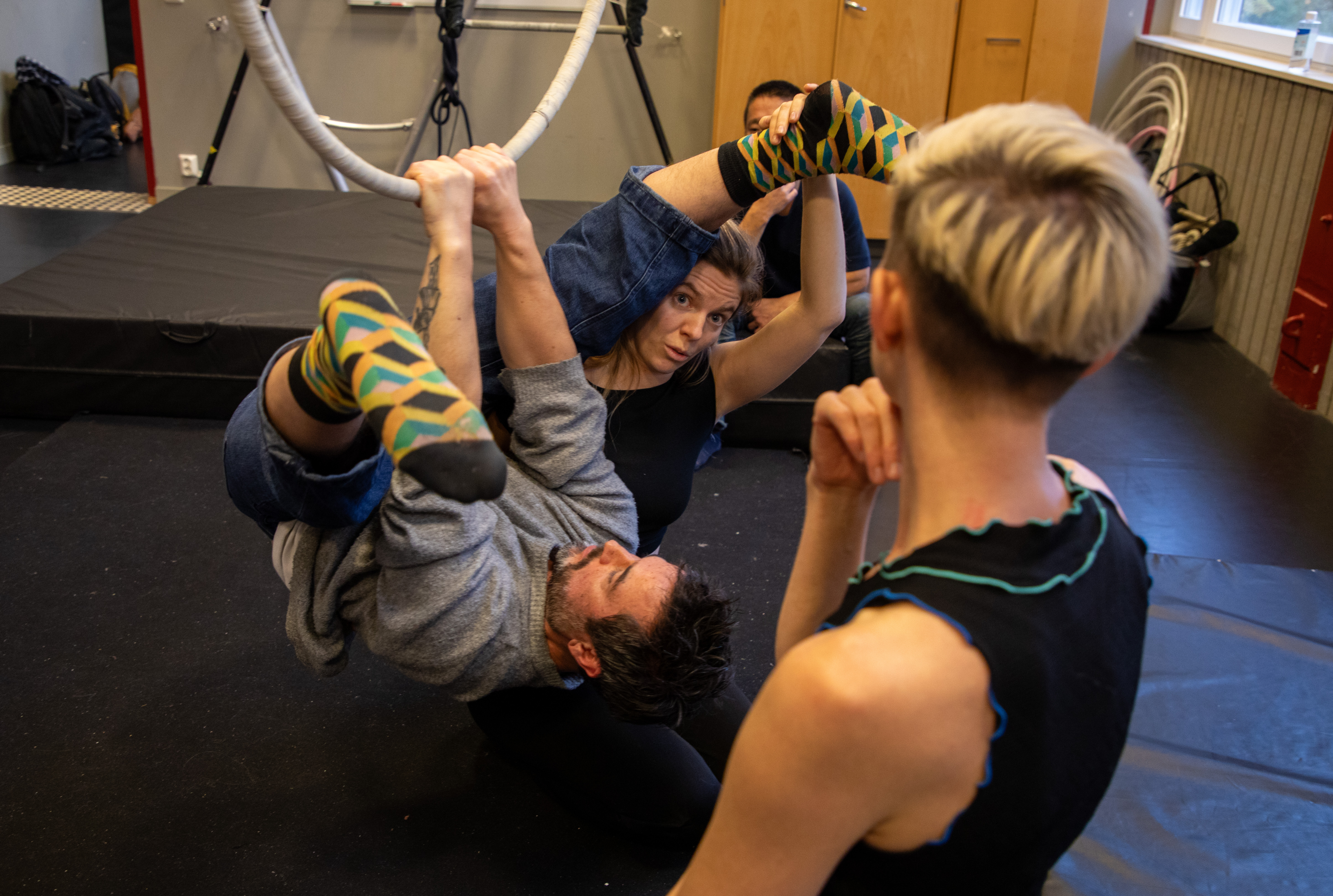
Alisan Funk, Assistant Professor in Circus, providing continuing professional development for circus teachers from the municipal arts schools in spotting – that is, how one can use one's body to support a person practising a circus technique.

SKH's educational programmes are organised into seven subject areas: circus, dance, dance pedagogy, film and media, opera, acting, and performing arts. (Note: The subject area performing arts encompasses the conditions that make stage performance possible behind and around the stage itself, including playwriting, dramaturgy, stage directing, scenography, mask design, costume design, sound design, lighting design, stage technology, and theatre production.)

All subject areas at SKH offer programmes at the Bachelor's degree and Master's degree as well as independent courses. The university also offers a teacher education programme in dance, parts of which are held in collaboration with Stockholm University. The master's programme in film music composition is held in collaboration with the Royal College of Music. As part of the government's arts school initiative Kulturskoleklivet, SKH offers courses intended to increase the number of teachers in Sweden's municipal arts schools, as well as professional development courses for practising arts educators.

Many programmes are highly specialised and admit only a small number of students. In some cases, such as the one-year master's programme in opera, repetiteur, intake may be as low as one student every other year. SKH consistently ranks among the Swedish higher education institutions with the highest number of applicants relative to places available and in some years, such as 2022, had the highest applicant-to-place ratio in the country. Several bachelor's programmes and most master's programmes use English as their working language, and for several programmes the majority of applicants are international students.

=== Doctoral education ===
Since 2016, SKH has held degree-awarding powers for the degree of Doctor of Philosophy in the Arts within the subject area artistic practice. The doctoral programme is grounded in artistic practice and is based on artistic work within SKH's subject areas. With upwards of 25 active participants, SKH has one of the largest artistic doctoral programmes in Sweden in terms of the number of doctoral students.

== Research ==
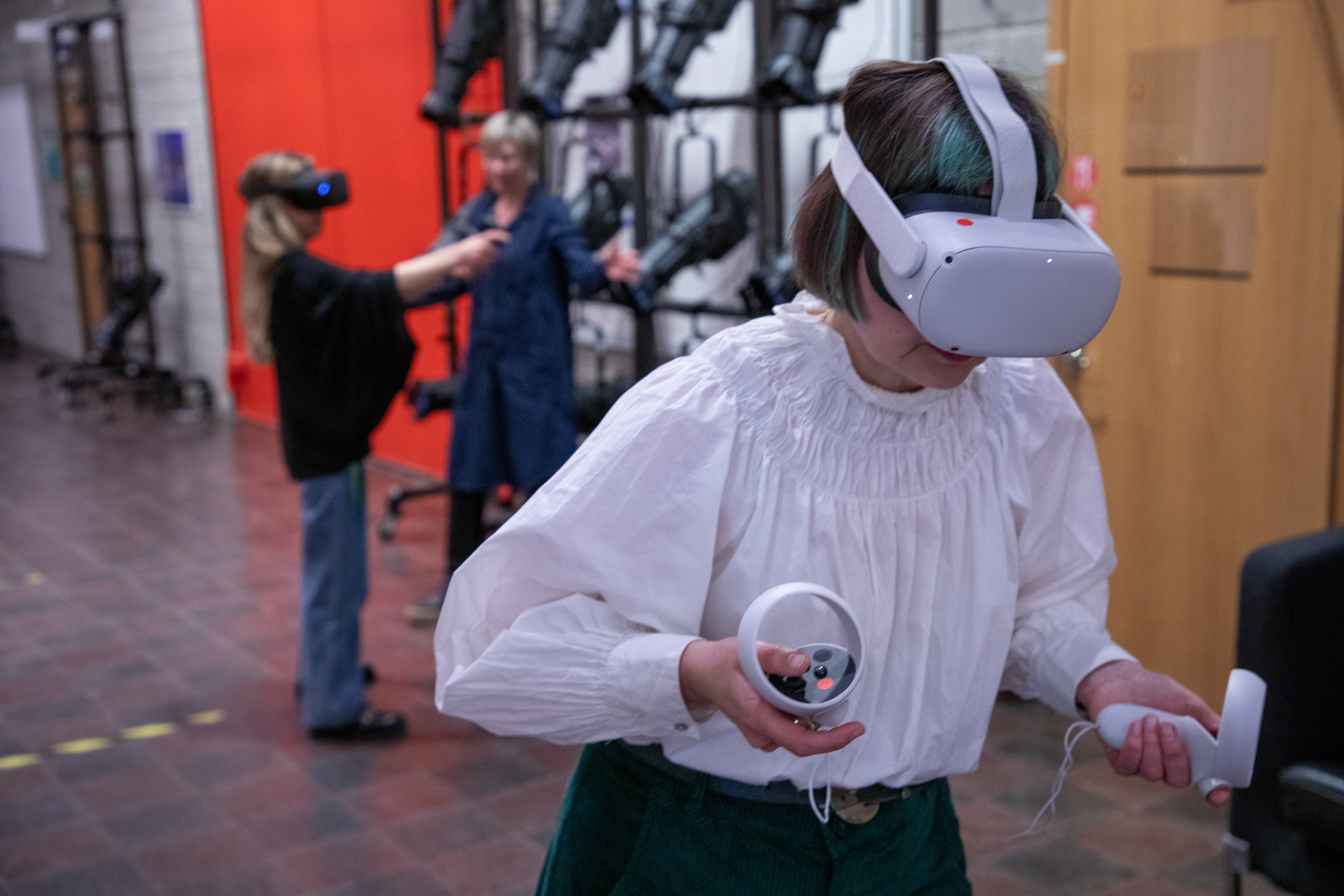
Demonstration during Research Week 2023 with Josephine Rydberg, doctoral student at Stockholm University of the Arts, whose research focuses on artistic dramaturgy in collective processes such as live-action role-playing games and Virtual reality worlds.

SKH conducts artistic research, that is, research carried out by practising artists within their own artistic practices. The establishment of the university and its raison d'être are closely connected to the development of artistic research in Sweden. It was in the same government bill that announced the creation of SKH in 2012 that the Swedish government formally introduced artistic research as a concept into the Higher Education Act. Central to the bill's reasoning for establishing SKH was the creation of "good conditions for the development of artistic research and doctoral education in Stockholm."

Research at SKH is conducted both within the university's departments and through an interdisciplinary research centre with three profile professors. Research results are published and disseminated through seminars, the publication series X Position, the institutional repository DiVA, and the Society for Artistic Research's database Research Catalogue.

SKH regularly organises research conferences. Among the recurring events are Research Week and the international conference Alliances & Commonalities, which is held every second year. Together with the Norwegian Programme for Artistic Research, SKH publishes the artistic research journal VIS – Nordic Journal for Artistic Research. SKH also participates in the research centre NAVET at the KTH Royal Institute of Technology, which conducts research at the intersection of science, art, and design.

== Facilities ==
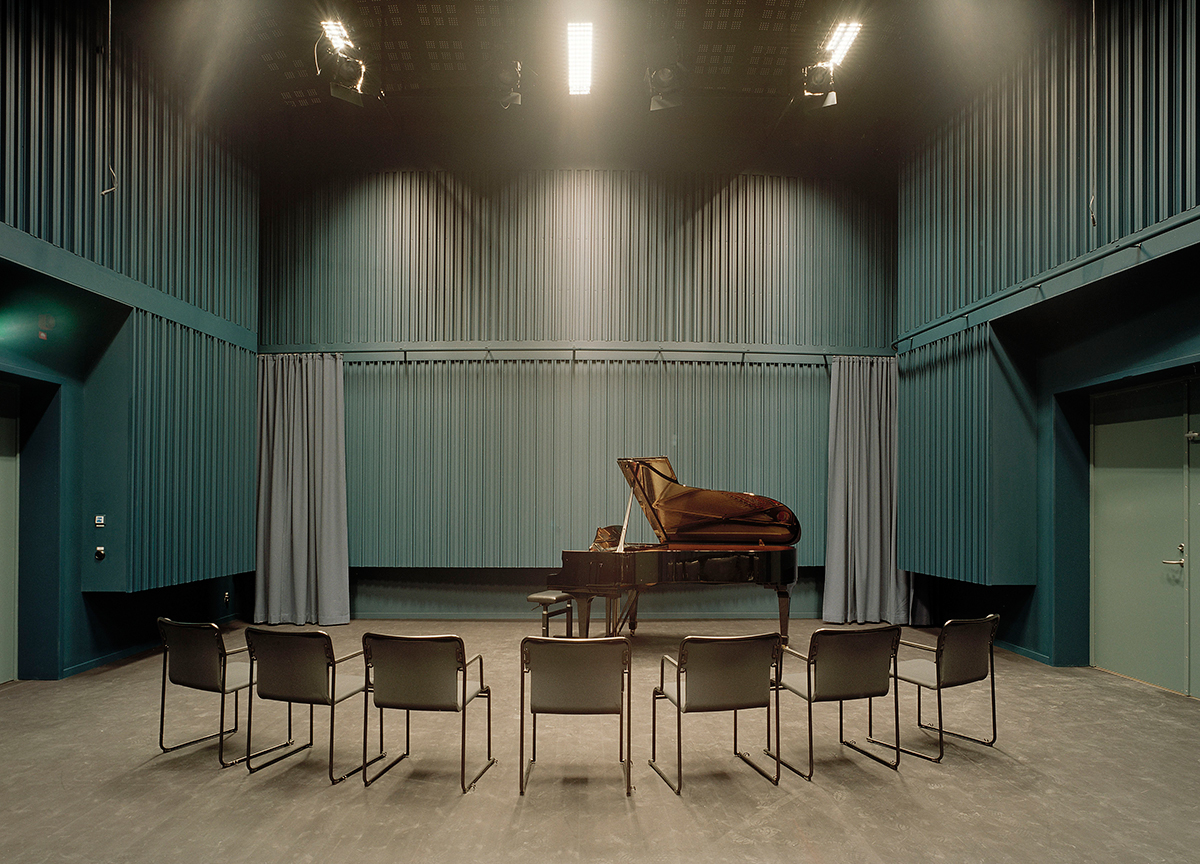
A rehearsal room for SKH's opera students. Opera rehearsal has distinct acoustic requirements that differ, for example, from those of acting rehearsal.

The art forms in which SKH educates and conducts research all require highly specialised facilities with regard to technology, acoustics, safety, flooring, and other functions. Large stage productions, film shoots, and specialised training must all be accommodated within the facilities.

SKH is spread across three separate buildings on the campus of the KTH Royal Institute of Technology in Östermalm, as well as two buildings on the former Konstfack campus in Gärdet, adjacent to Filmhuset. One of the buildings, housing facilities for performing arts, film and media, as well as the university's central administration, was purpose-built for the former Dramatiska Institutet in 2001. It constitutes the only realised component of the proposed Arts Campus project on Gärdet that was investigated during the 1990s. The remaining buildings are all adaptations of existing structures to the university's needs. Among them is the circus hall, completed in 2011, which was converted from a former laboratory hall at KTH. The hall has an 11-metre ceiling height to accommodate trapeze and other circus disciplines involving aerial performance.

Beginning in 2030, SKH plans to relocate all its education and research to a single building in the Slakthusområdet area of Stockholm. The building is being designed specifically for SKH and will contain the specialised facilities required by the university's various subject areas and research activities. An architectural competition was held in 2021–2022 for the design of the new building, which was won by 3XN with the proposal To See and Be Seen.
