= University College of Opera =

University college in Stockholm, Sweden

Coordinates: 59°21′01″N 18°04′23″E

- Operahögskolan i Stockholm
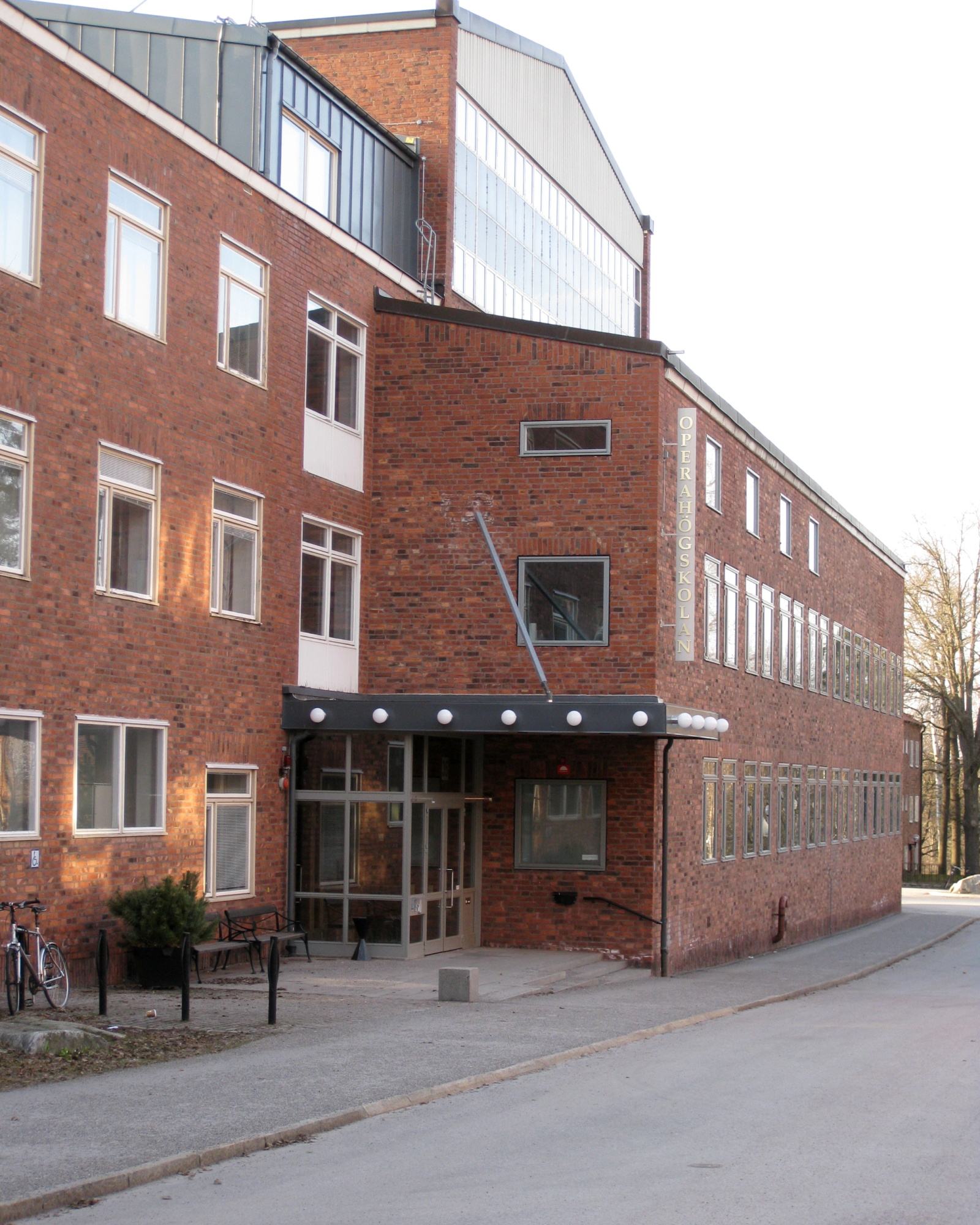
- The college at KTH Royal Institute of Technology, Campus Valhallavägen
- Type: Public
- Affiliation: Stockholm University of the Arts
- Students: 40
- Location: Stockholm, Sweden
- Website: www.uniarts.se

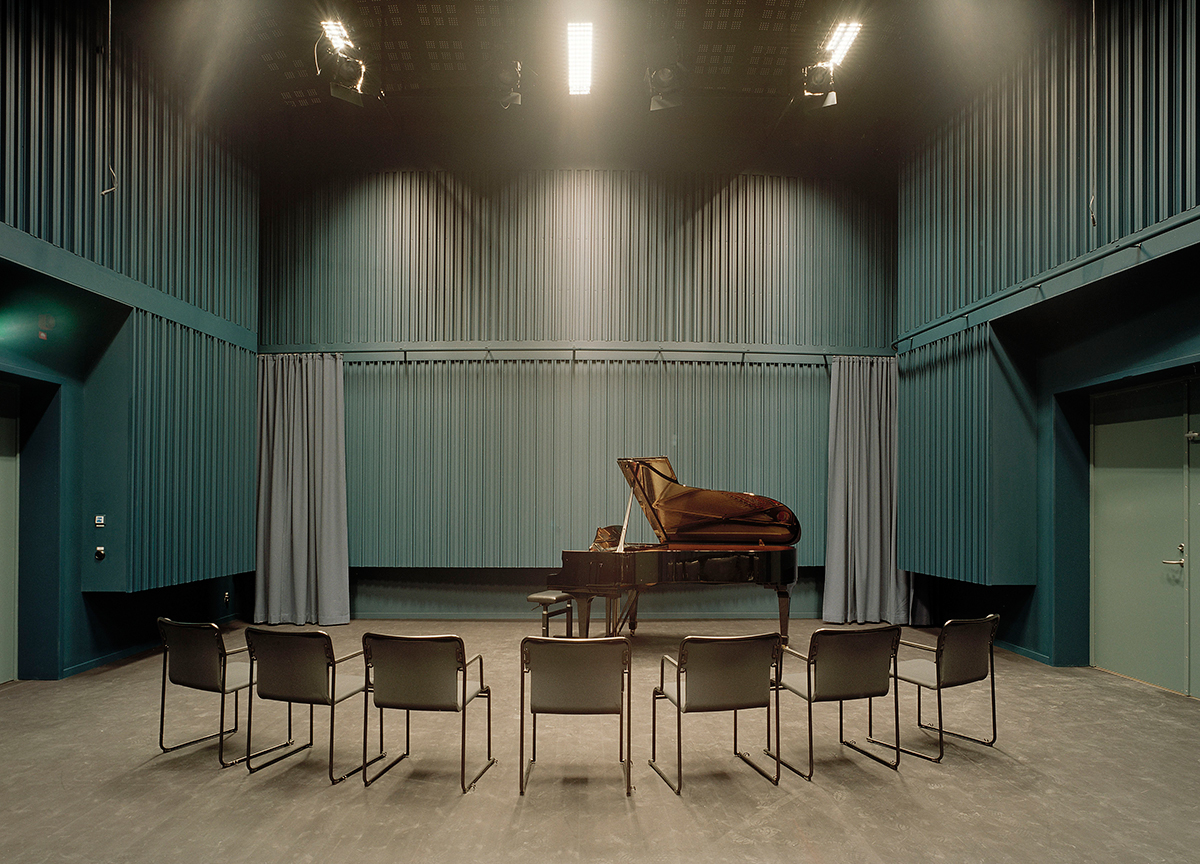
Performance space

The University College of Opera (Swedish: Operahögskolan i Stockholm) was until 2014 a Swedish institution in Stockholm offering higher education in the field of opera music and related arts. Since 1 January 2014, it has been fully integrated as part of the Stockholm University of the Arts, and the previous name is no longer in use. It was tasked with educating singers, répétiteurs, and opera directors and had an enrollment of approximately 40 students, including 36 singers.
