= List of Swedish operatic sopranos =

This is a list of operatic sopranos and mezzo-sopranos who were born in Sweden or whose work is closely associated with that country.

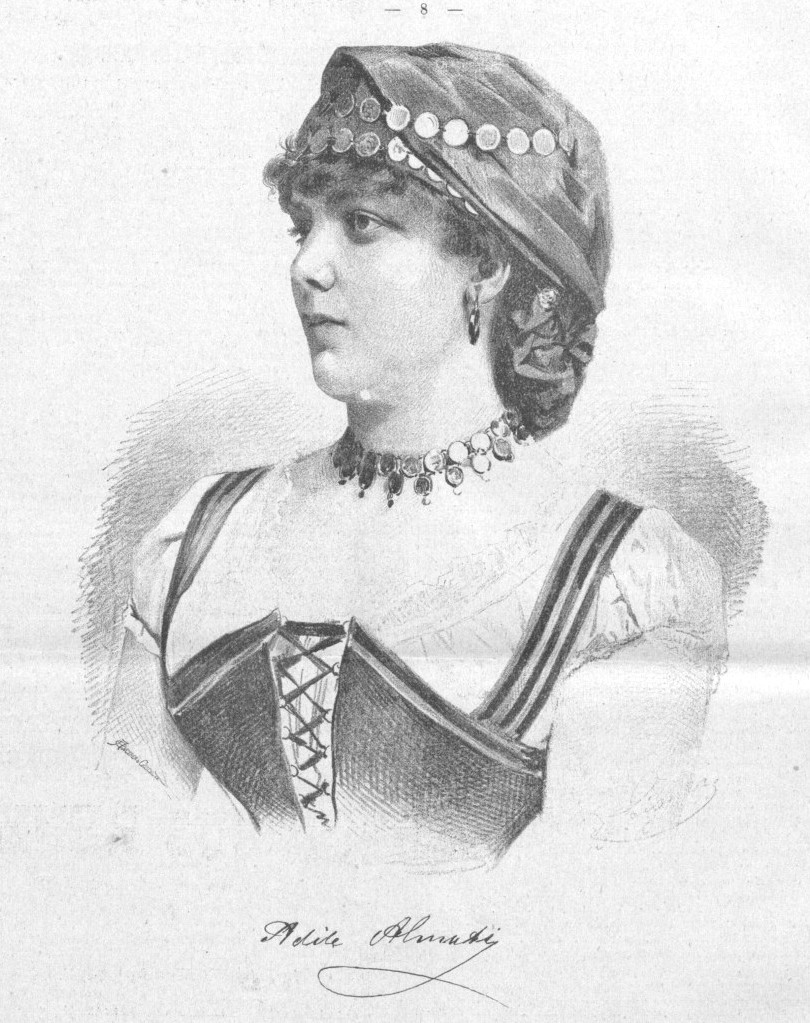
Adèle Almati

== A ==
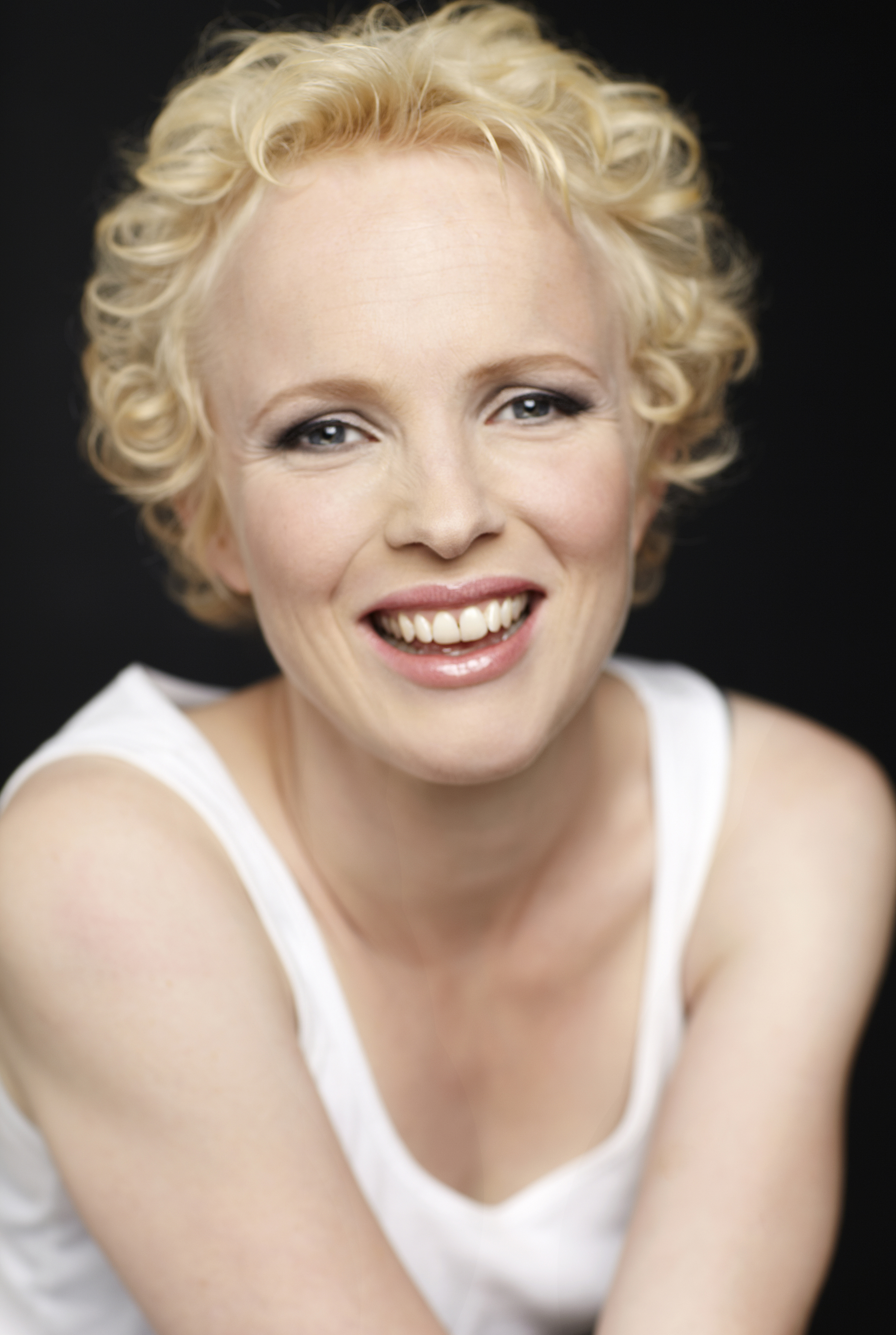
Kerstin Avemo

- Eufrosyne Abrahamson (1836–1869), soprano who performed in operas mainly in Madrid and Vienna
- Adèle Almati (1861–1919), German-born Swedish mezzo-soprano who performed leading roles at the Royal Swedish Opera
- Ruth Althén (1890–1985), soprano at the Royal Swedish Opera, concert performer
- Vendela Andersson-Sörensen (1860–1926), soprano at the Royal Swedish Opera from 1882 to 1887
- Susanna Andersson (born 1977), soprano opera singer, performing internationally in opera and recitals
- Lovisa Augusti (c.1751–1790), German-born Swedish soprano who made her mark at the Royal Swedish Opera
- Kerstin Avemo (born 1973), coloratura soprano performing in opera houses and concert halls throughout Europe

== B ==
- Maria Bengtsson (born 1975), soprano performing in Europe's major opera houses
- Julie Berwald (1822–1877), celebrated opera and concert singer, at the Royal Swedish Opera from 1847
- Irma Björck (1898–1993), mezzo-soprano opera and operetta singer at the Royal Swedish Opera
- Olga Björkegren (1857–1950), actress at the Swedish Theatre and singer at the Royal Swedish Opera
- Anna-Lisa Björling (1910–2006), soprano opera singer and actress, performing at the Royal Swedish Opera from 1948
- Karin Branzell (1891–1974), mezzo-soprano at the New York Metropolitan Opera and in Europe, noted for Wagnerian roles
- Ingela Brimberg (born 1964), soprano and mezzo-soprano opera singer who has performed in Sweden, Germany and Belgium
- Malin Byström (born 1973), soprano performing leading roles in Europe's major opera houses

== C ==
- Sara Cahier (1870–1951), American-born Swedish mezzo-soprano in opera and lieder, performed in Europe and New York
- Justina Casagli (1794–1841), soprano at the Royal Swedish Opera, also performed in Italy and Germany
- Julia Claussen (1879–1941), mezzo-soprano with the Royal Swedish Opera, also in London, Paris and the United States

== D ==
- Tove Dahlberg (born 1973), mezzo-soprano with Royal Swedish Opera, also in London and the United States
- Kjerstin Dellert (1925–2018), soprano with the Royal Swedish opera, later theatre manager
- Katija Dragojevic (born 1970), mezzo-soprano and recitalist active across Europe

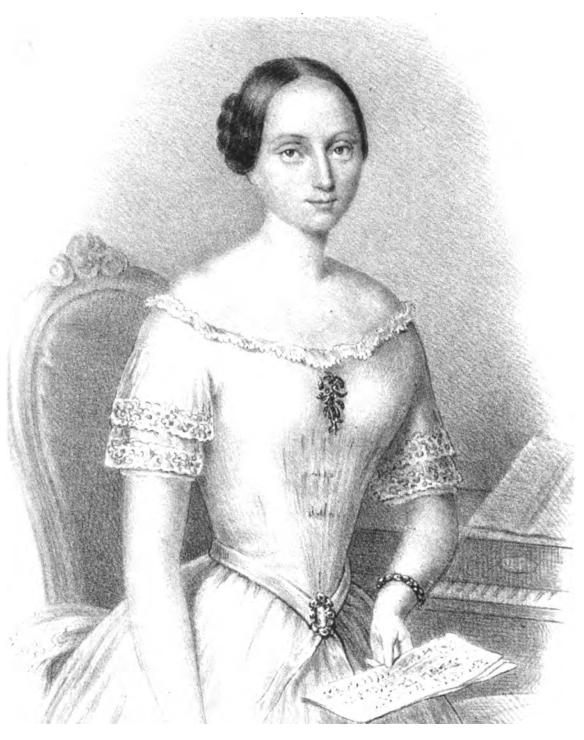
Mathilda Ebeling

== E ==
- Mathilda Ebeling (1826–1851), concert pianist and soprano opera singer, performed at the Royal Swedish Opera and the Royal Opera in Berlin
- Dina Edling (1854–1935), mezzo-soprano with the Royal Swedish Opera from 1877 to 1892
- Selma Ek (1856–1941), leading soprano of her day, remembered for her roles in the operas of Mozart, Verdi and Wagner
- Wilhelmina Enbom (1804–1880), notable Swedish soprano in the 1830s at the Royal Swedish Opera
- Mathilda Enequist (1833–1898), opera singer and singing instructor known as Signora Biondini

== F ==
- Maria Fontosh (born 1976), Ukrainian-born Russian soprano now in Sweden, performing at the Royal Swedish Opera
- Wilhelmina Fundin (1819–1911), soprano who sang at the Royal Swedish Opera for 30 years until 1871

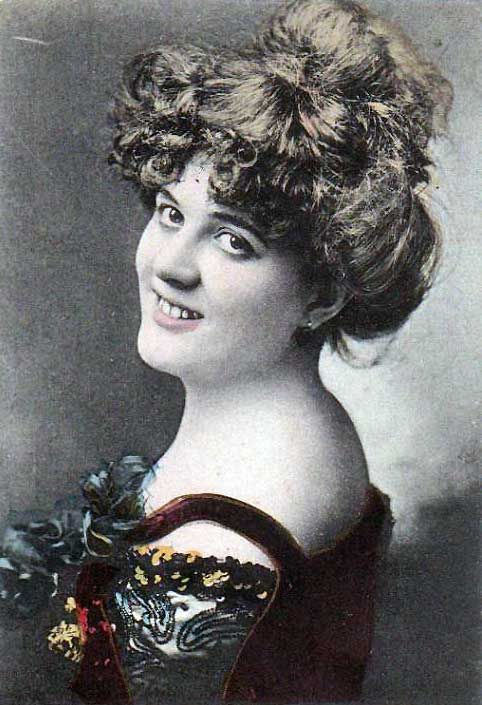
Rosa Grünberg

== G ==
- Maria Gelhaar (1858–1920), soprano who performed with the Royal Swedish Opera from 1883
- Mathilda Gelhaar (1814–1889), one of the most noted singers of the Swedish Opera in the 1840s and 1850s
- Wilhelmina Gelhaar (1837–1923), soprano at Stockholm's Royal Theatre from 1857, known in particular for her coloratura roles
- Mathilda Grabow (1852–1940), soprano considered to be one of the stars of Swedish opera in the late 19th century
- Rosa Grünberg (1878–1960), actress and soprano singer, considered a prima donna of Swedish opera in the early 1900s
- Ellen Gulbranson (1863–1947), soprano known for her roles in Wagnerian operas, also sang regularly in Bayreuth

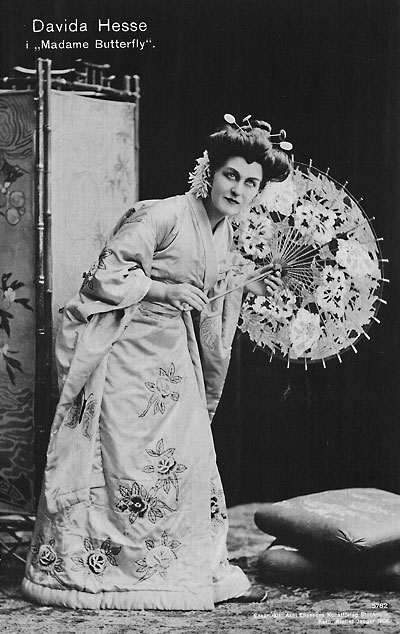
Davida Hesse-Lilienberg

== H ==
- Lilly Hafgren (1884–1965), performed mainly in Germany, including Bayreuth
- Margareta Hallin (1931–2020), coloratura soprano, composer and actress, joined the Royal Swedish Opera in 1956 and toured internationally
- Malin Hartelius (born 1966), soprano who has performed mainly in Austria and Switzerland
- Signe Hebbe (1837–1926), soprano who sang throughout Europe in opera and concerts, later voice instructor
- Charlotte Hellekant (born 1962), mezzo-soprano active in opera mainly on American stages
- Davida Hesse-Lilienberg (1877–1964), soprano who performed leading roles with the Royal Swedish Opera until 1909
- Cecilia Hjortsberg (born 1973), soprano who has sung at the Royal Danish Theatre since 2005
- Thekla Hofer (1852–1938), operatic soprano in Stockholm, Saint Petersburg and Riga, voice teacher
- Hannah Holgersson (born 1976), soprano who has performed mainly as a concert soloist

== J ==
- Agnes Janson (1861–1947), mezzo-soprano opera singer and recitalist, voice teacher in Australia from 1906
- Busk Margit Jonsson (born 1929), soprano with the Royal Swedish Opera until 1983

== K ==
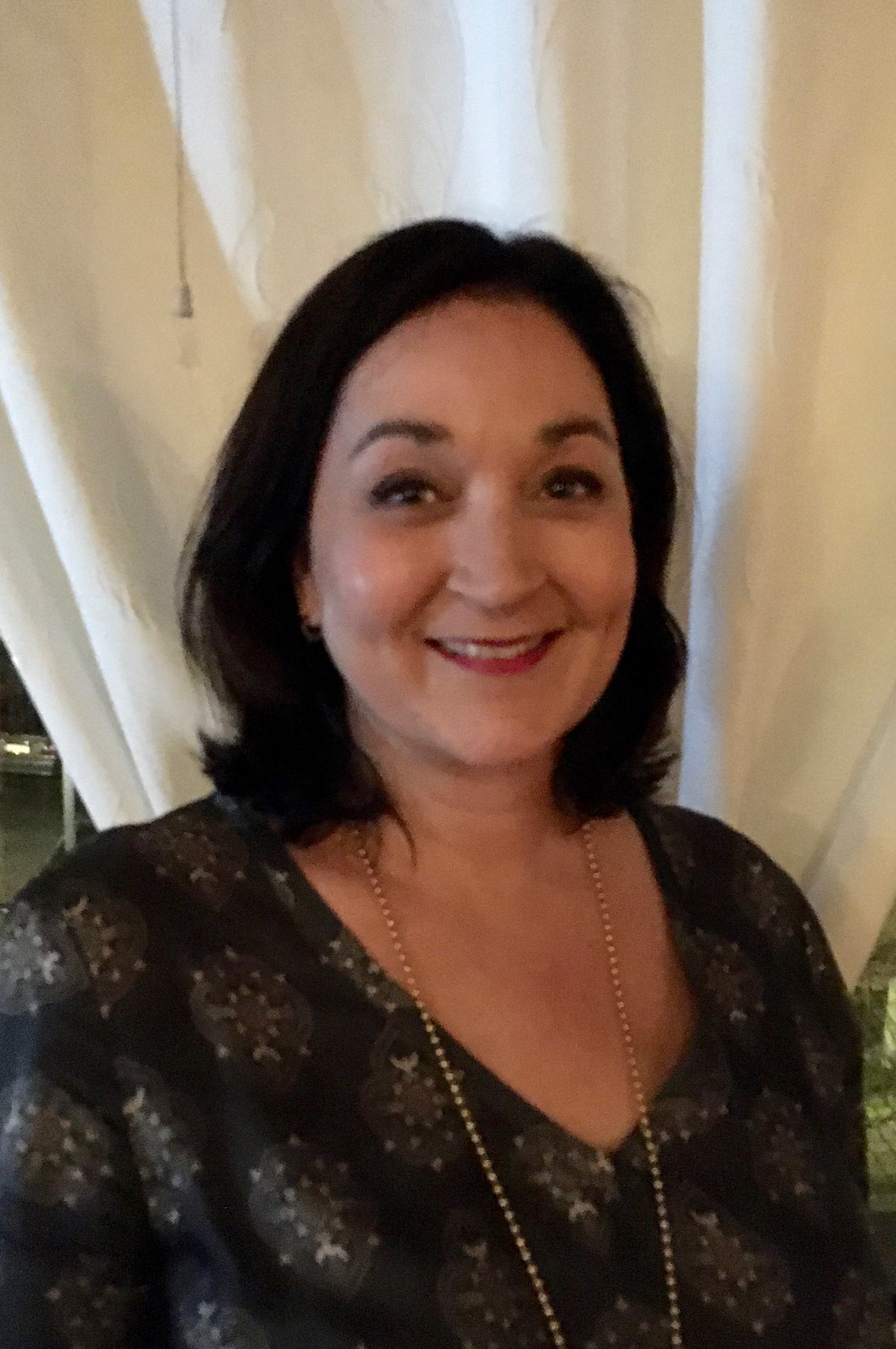
Katarina Karnéus

- Katarina Karnéus (born 1965), mezzo-soprano opera singer and recitalist, active first in the UK and New York, later in Sweden
- Maria Keohane (bonr 1971), soloist who has performed in festivals throughout Europe and made many recordings
- Anna Maria Klemming (1864–1889), soprano, short but successful career with the Royal Swedish Opera until her early death

== L ==
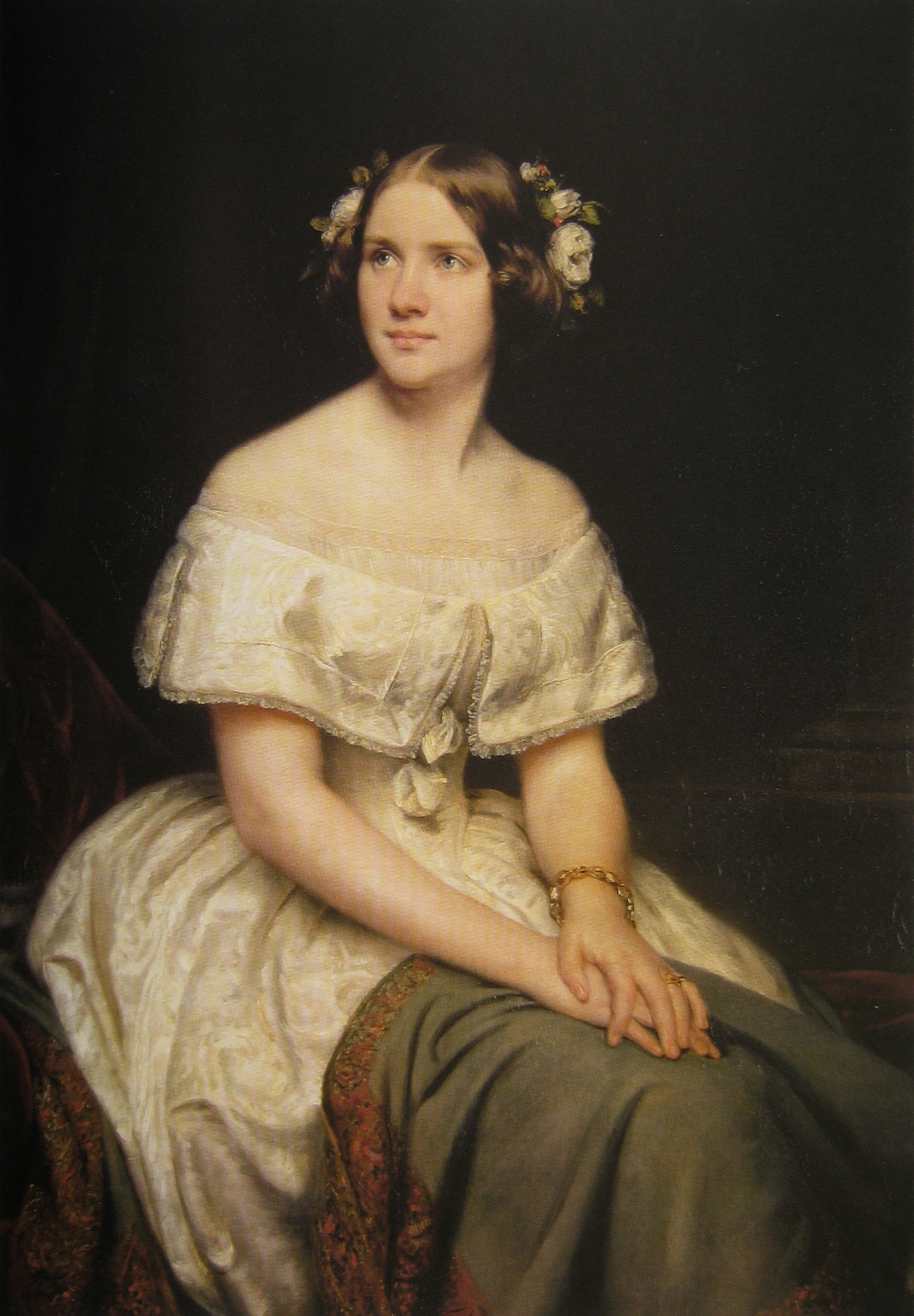
Jenny Lind (portrait by Eduard Magnus)

- Karin Langebo (1927–2019), soprano and harpist, active mainly in Sweden and Norway
- Nanny Larsén-Todsen (1884–1982), soprano active in Stockholm, Milan, New York and Bayreuth, notable for her roles in Wagner's operas
- Lisa Larsson (born 1967), soprano who has performed widely as a soloist in concerts and festivals
- Catarina Ligendza (born 1937), soprano active mainly in German opera houses and in Bayreuth, known for her Wagnerian performances
- Sofia Liljegren (1765–1795), Finnish-Swedish soprano who was a popular performer at the Royal Swedish Opera in the 1780s
- Elisabeth Lillström (1717–1791), early Swedish actress who performed in stage plays and in comic opera roles as a soprano
- Jenny Lind (1820–1887), highly regarded soprano, performed in Sweden, across Europe and in concerts throughout the United States
- Berit Lindholm (1934–2023), performed at Covent Garden and at the Metropolitan Opera, notable for roles in Wagner's operas
- Göta Ljungberg (1893–1955), major Wagnerian soprano of the 1920s, sang throughout America and Europe
- Magna Lykseth-Skogman (1874–1949), Norwegian-born Swedish soprano, prima donna of the Royal Swedish Opera

== M ==
- Marie Louise Marcadet (1758–1804), opera singer and stage actress active in Stockholm and Paris
- Hillevi Martinpelto (born 1958), operatic soprano and recitalist performing in Sweden and internationally
- Kerstin Meyer (1928–2020), mezzo-soprano opera and concert performer mainly in Stockholm, Hamburg and London
- Louise Michaëli (1830–1875), prima donna soprano of the Royal Swedish opera, also successful in London
- Caroline Müller (1755–1826), highly successful Danish mezzo-soprano first in Copenhagen and later in Stockholm

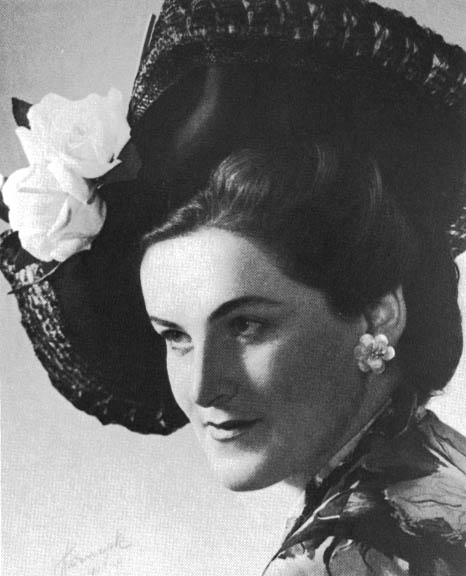
Birgit Nilsson

== N ==
- Birgit Nilsson (1918–2005), celebrated soprano in Sweden and internationally, best known for her roles in the operas of Wagner and Richard Strauss
- Christina Nilsson (1843-1921), coloratura soprano, internationally successful, mainly in Paris, London, North America and Moscow
- Henriette Nissen-Saloman (1819–1879), mezzo-soprano opera singer and pianist, active touring across Europe and engaged in Saint Petersburg
- Birgit Nordin (1934–2022), soprano with the Royal Swedish Opera remembered for her Mozart roles

== O ==
- Elisabeth Olin (1740–1828), first prima donna of the Royal Swedish Opera from its inauguration in 1773
- Augusta Öhrström-Renard (1856–1921), mezzo-soprano at the Royal Danish Theatre and the Metropolitan Opera, concerts in France and North America
- Anna Oscàr (1875–1915), leading soprano at the Royal Swedish Opera in the early 20th century
- Carolina Östberg (1853–1924), celebrated soprano at the Royal Swedish Opera in the late 19th century, also performed in Denmark, Germany and Norway
- Anne Sofie von Otter (born 1955), mezzo-soprano opera performer, recitalist, and pop singer, with extensive discography

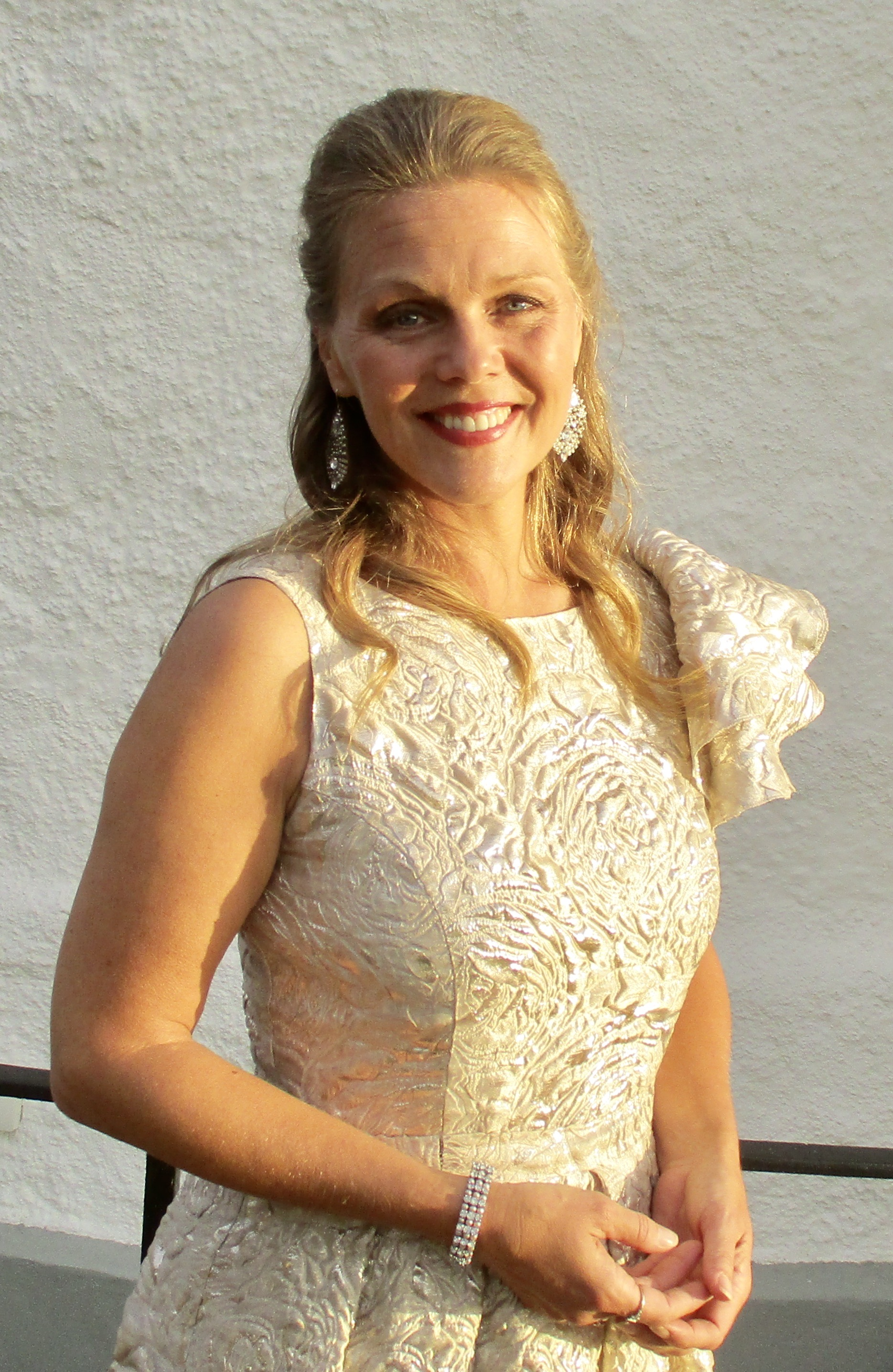
Miah Persson

== P ==
- Gertrud Pålson-Wettergren (1897–1921), mezzo-soprano with the Royal Swedish Opera, also at the Metropolitan Opera and Covent Garden
- Miah Persson (born 1969). soprano at the Royal Danish Opera and international concert performer

== Q ==
- Isa Quensel (1905–1981), actress and soprano at the Royal Swedish Opera, appeared in over 50 films, plays and operas

== R ==
- Christina Rahm (1763–1837), successful actress and soprano, active with the Stenborg Theatre Company in Stockholm
- Signe Rappe-Welden (1879–1974), soprano in Sweden and abroad, Bach recitalist, voice teacher
- Amalia Riégo (1850–1926), soprano with the Royal Danish Opera from 1872
- Elin Rombo (born 1976), soprano performing in Sweden and internationally in opera and recitals

== S ==
- Hjördis Schymberg (1909–2008), coloratura and lyric soprano, active at the Royal Swedish Opera and internationally in recitals and operas
- Anna Sofia Sevelin (1790–1871), initially alto, later soprano, highly active with the Royal Swedish Opera until 1833
- Gitta-Maria Sjöberg (born 1957), Swedish-born soprano, soloist with the Royal Danish Theatre from 1987
- Elisabeth Söderström (1927–2009), soprano remembered for her roles in the operas of Rachmaninoff and Sibelius in Sweden and internationally
- Nina Stemme (born 1963), celebrated Wagnerian soprano, performing with opera companies across Europe and the United States
- Fredrika Stenhammar (1836–1880), soprano with the Royal Swedish Opera, later voice instructor
- Elisabet Strid (born 1976), soprano known for performances in the operas of Wagner and Strauss at many prominent venues

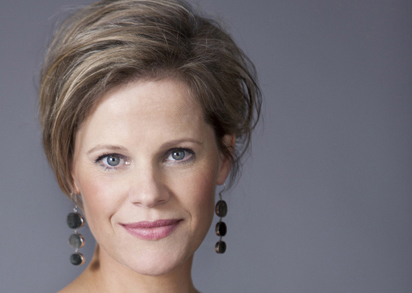
Camilla Tilling

- Birgitta Svendén (born 1952), mezzo-soprano known for Wagnerian performances at the Royal Swedish Opera, Metropolitan Opera and Bayreuth
- Erika Sunnegårdh (born 1966), soprano who has sung with the Metropolitan Opera as well as in Berlin, Malmö and Stockholm

== T ==
- Bertha Tammelin (1836–1915), actress, mezzo-soprano opera singer, pianist, composer and drama instructor
- Iréne Theorin (born 1963), soprano in operas and recitals across Europe and in the United States, noted for her Wagnerian roles

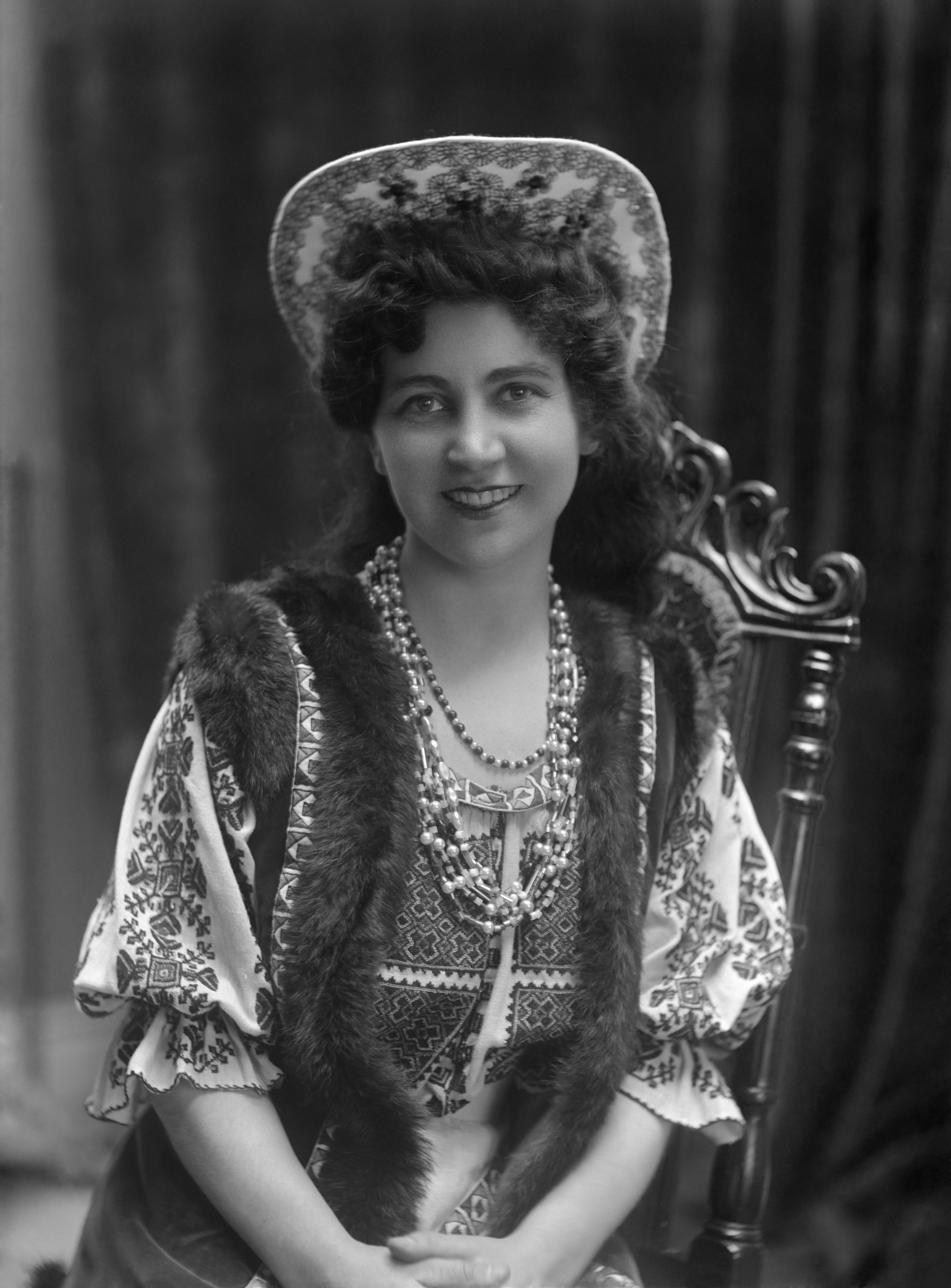
Lilly Walleni

- Camilla Tilling (born 1971), soprano in opera and concert across Europe and in the United States
- Ingrid Tobiasson (born 1951), mezzo-soprano singing leading roles at the Royal Swedish Opera, also concert recitalist and recording artist

== W ==
- Lilly Walleni (1875–1920), mezzo-soprano remembered for her Wagner role in German opera houses and Stockholm
- Elisabeth Wärnfeldt (born 1956), soprano opera and concert singer, author of libretti
- Jeanette Wässelius (1784–1853), leading prima donna of the Royal Swedish Opera in the early 19th century
- Sara Widén (1981–2014), soprano with the Royal Swedish Opera until her early death from cancer
- Henriette Widerberg (1796–1872), soprano, prima donna with the Royal Swedish Opera from 1820
- Hedvig Wigert (1748–1780), early soprano performer with the Royal Swedish Opera from its inauguration in 1773
- Zulamith Wellander (1857–1919), mezzo-soprano with the Royal Danish Opera, guest performer in Denmark and Germany, voice instructor
