= Hjortsberg =

Hjortsberg is a Swedish surname. Notable people with the surname include:

- Cecilia Hjortsberg (born 1973), Swedish opera singer
- Hedda Hjortsberg (1777–1867), Swedish ballerina
- Lars Hjortsberg (1772–1843), Swedish actor
- William Hjortsberg (1941–2017), American writer
- An area in the Swedish town Falkenberg.
