= Gustav III's Pavilion =

Pavilion in Solna Municipality, Sweden

Coordinates: 59°21′46″N 18°02′21″E

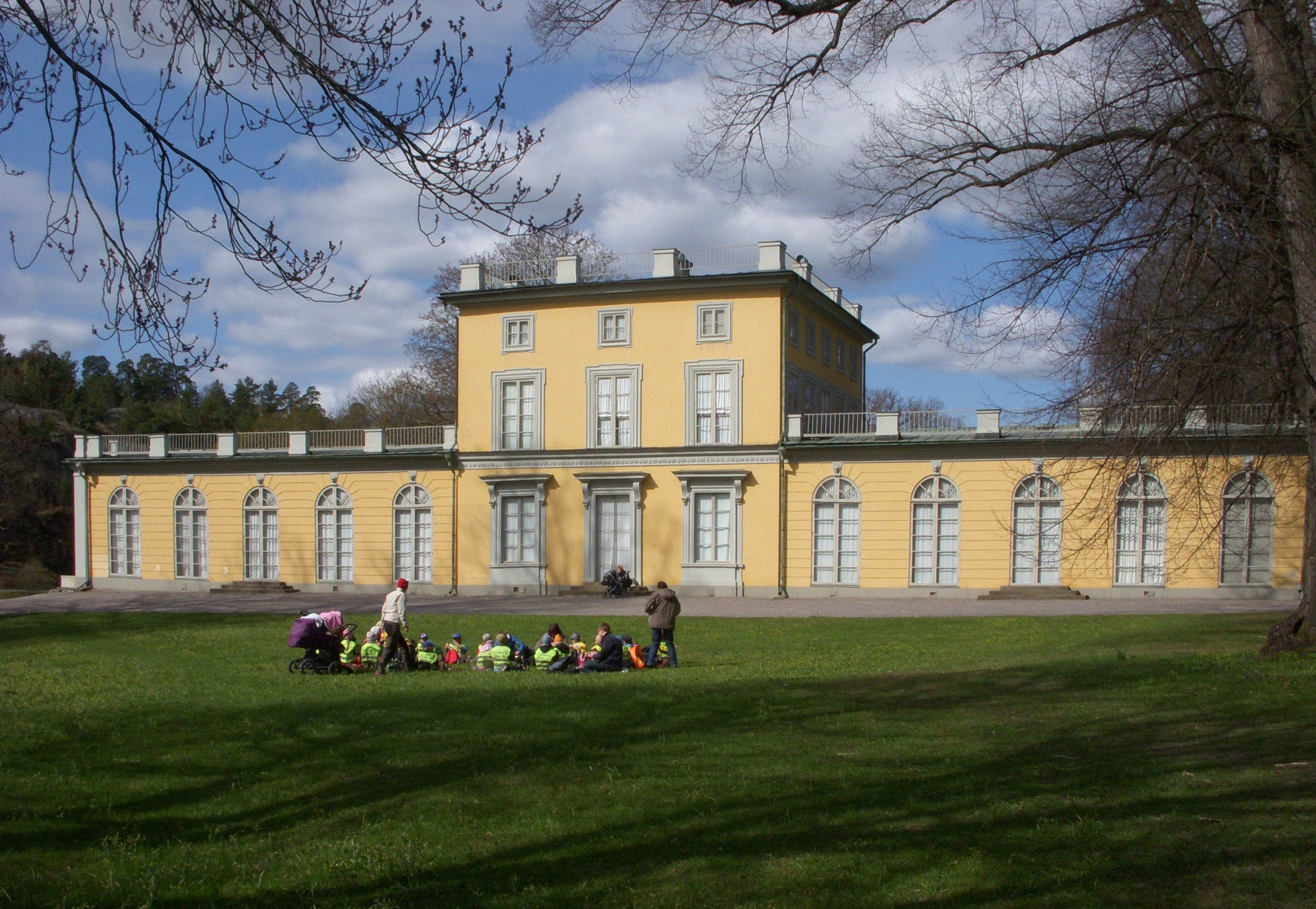
Gustav III's Pavilion at Haga, in spring 2010

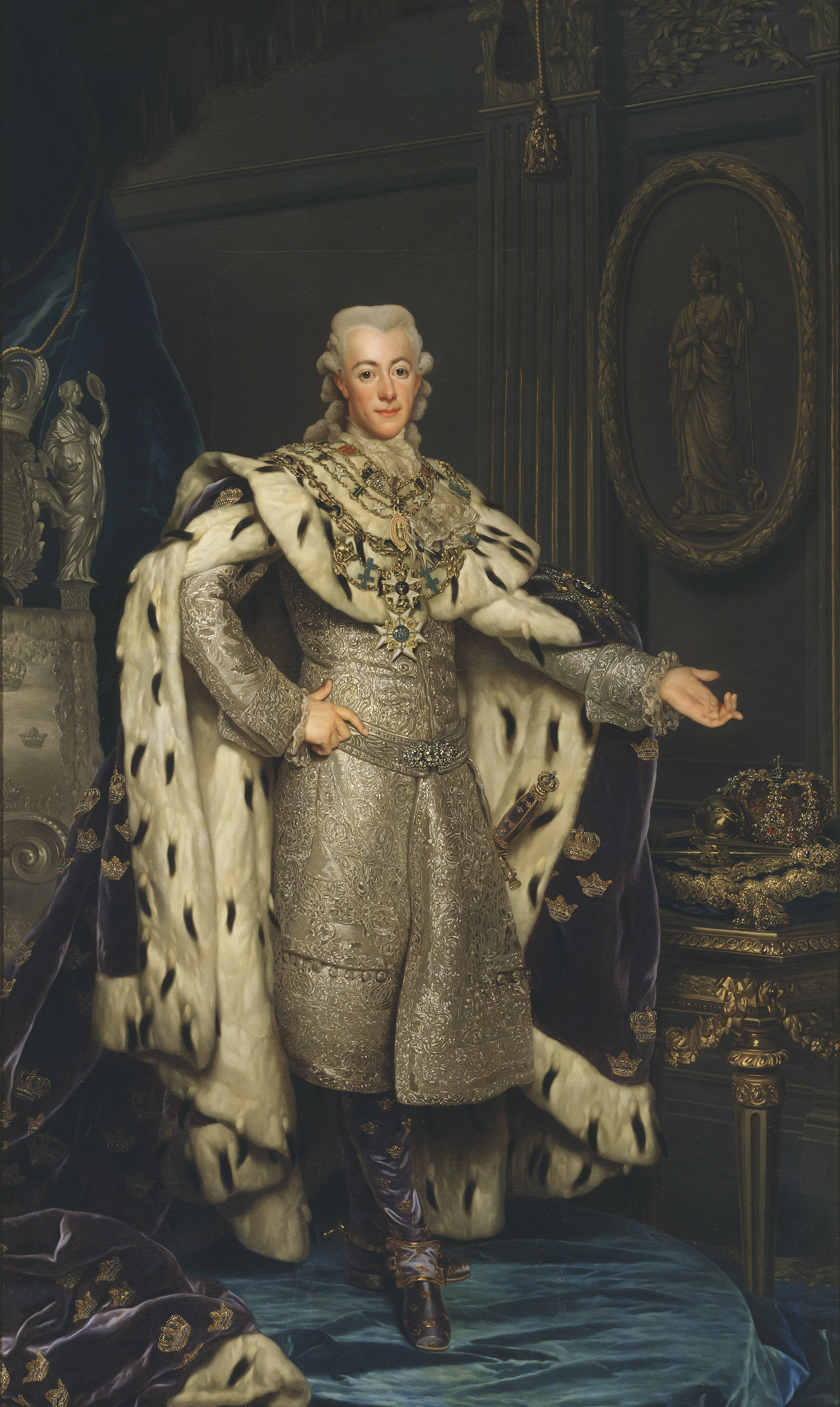
Gustav III

Gustav III's Pavilion (Swedish: Gustav III:s paviljong) is a royal pavilion at the Haga Park, 2 km north of Stockholm. As a highlight in Swedish art history, the Pavilion is a fine example of the European neoclassicism of the late 18th century in Northern Europe. Beside the Pavilion lie the "Sultan's Copper Tents", buildings designed to resemble big tents.

== Pavilion ==
The pavilion was built in 1787 by the architect Olof Tempelman with detailed instructions from King Gustav III who was highly personally involved in the project, producing some basic designs himself and suggesting changes once the work was under way. These changes included extending both wings by the span of two windows.

The designer Louis Masreliez, who became a trendsetter in the interior design of the period– was commissioned for the interiors. The pavilion was just one of many great plans and visions that Gustav III had for the Haga Park, many of which made it no further than the drawing board. Gustav III made use of the pavilion for a few years before his assassination. It was from the pavilion that Gustav III left for the fateful masquerade ball at the Opera on 16 March 1792. After the assassination of Gustav III, Duke Charles used the pavilion as his temporary residence.

In the 1840s, King Oscar I commissioned a restoration of the building by architect George Theodor Chiewitz. Sculptures and other plasterwork ornamental features were painted grey and added to the façade, which was originally yellow and without decoration. The ionic columns at the gables were replaced by new columns in Italian marble. The glass wall of the Hall of Mirrors was re-worked with new, thin bronze glazing-bars and the outdoor stairway was clad in white marble. The dining room was decorated in a Pompeian style, including the ceiling.

The Pavilion underwent a major restoration between 1937 and 1946 under palace architect Ragnar Hjort. During this time, thanks to the discovery of original Masreliez designs for each room, it was possible to restore the interior to its original form.

In 2005 the pavilion inspired the design of the music pavilion at Stålboga.

== Copper Tents ==
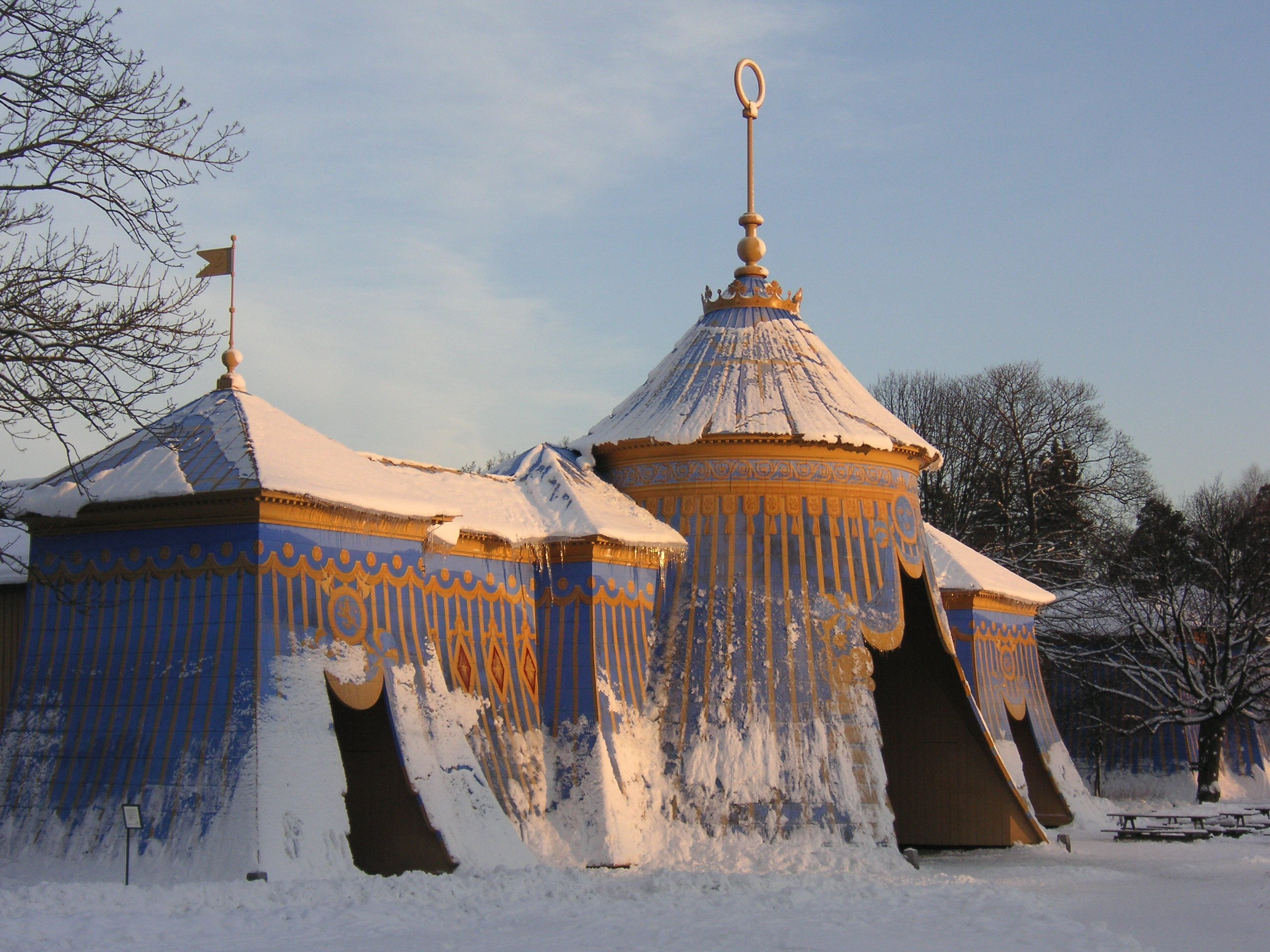
The Copper Tents in winter.

The Sultan's Copper Tents, originally three buildings for the palace guard, designed by the painter Louis Jean Desprez and built during 1787 to 1790. Desprez proposed that all the façades of the buildings should be designed as three Turkish tents, clad in decoratively painted copper plate. However, tent façades were only built on the side facing the main lawns, which still gives the desired illusion of a sultan's encampment on the edge of the forest.

The middle tent was destroyed completely by fire in 1953. The front of the tent was rebuilt during 1962 to 1964 under the leadership of palace architect Ragnar Hjorth. The buildings behind the tent façades were rebuilt in 1977–1978, following plans by palace architect Torbjörn Olsson. He turned the stableyard, formerly open, into a tent room with a ceiling. Today the middle copper tent is home to the Haga Park Museum. The tent to the east houses a restaurant and the one on the western side is accommodation. The copper tents are a national monument and protected under law.

In 1996, the area comprising Ulriksdal, Haga Park, Brunnsviken and Djurgården became the world's first National City Park. The area is unique by virtue of its natural, cultural and recreational value and its direct proximity to a big city. Mainly administered by the Royal Djurgården Administration, the creation of the National City Park serves to strengthen the prospects of perpetuating the royal historic heritage spanning from Djurgården hunting park to the Gustavian parklands of Haga.

== See also ==
- Haga Palace
