= Vadstena Academy =

Music academy in Sweden

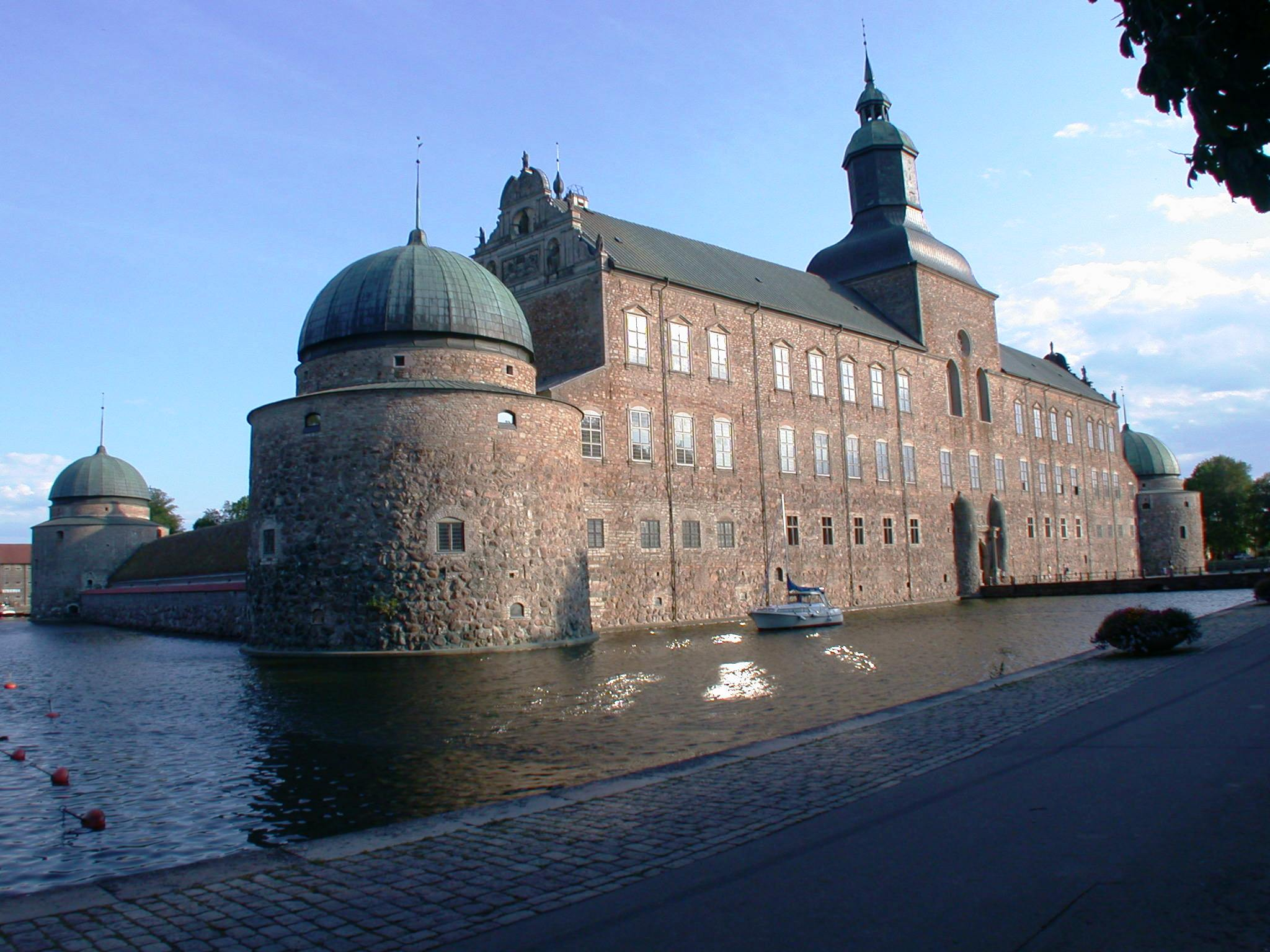
Vadstena castle – venue for many of Vadstena Academy's summer operas

Vadstena Academy (Swedish: Vadstena-Akademien, full name Stiftelsen internationella Vadstena-Akademien) is a music academy founded in 1964 by opera pedagogue Ingrid Maria Rappe (1915–1994) and based in the small city of Vadstena in Sweden. The academy is a major commissioner of new operas and most of the new operas in Sweden are performed at Vadstena Academy.

== Activity ==
The academy's mission is to conduct training courses, particularly in classical singing, and to perform older and newly written operas or dramatic musical theatre. Musical drama performances are performed annually, usually in Vadstena's Old Theater or in the wedding room at Vadstena Castle during the summer months. A considerable amount of research is carried out under the auspices of the academy about older music and drama, and many Baroque operas have been revived by the academy.

Many singers have participated since the academy's inception, among them many who are now established on the international opera scene, i.a. Nina Stemme, Malena Ernman, Loa Falkman, Anne Sofie von Otter and Tove Dahlberg.

Vadstena Academy is a major commissioner of contemporary Swedish opera. Over 30 new works have premiered at one of Vadstena Academy's scenes. Nine Vadstena Academy operas have been televised by Sveriges Television and over 40 on radio by Sveriges Radio.

== Organisation ==
The Academy has an office in Stockholm but most activities take place in Vadstena. Financing comes from Swedish government, county and municipal grants, as well as endowments, sponsors and box office revenues.

== Artistic directors ==
- Ingrid Maria Rappe 1964–1968
- Arnold Östman 1969–1981
- Torbjörn Lillieqvist 1982–1985
- Per-Erik Öhrn 1986–1990
- Clas Pehrsson 1990–1992
- Anders Wiklund 1992–2001
- Nils Spangenberg 2001–
