= Stålboga Summer Opera =

Coordinates: 59°14′09″N 16°49′17″E

Stålboga Summer Opera (Swedish: Stålboga sommaropera) is an annual event staged at the privately owned Stålboga Manor House on a small peninsula in the lake Eklången 35 kilometers from Eskilstuna and 100 kilometers from Stockholm, Sweden.

== Mill and manor house ==
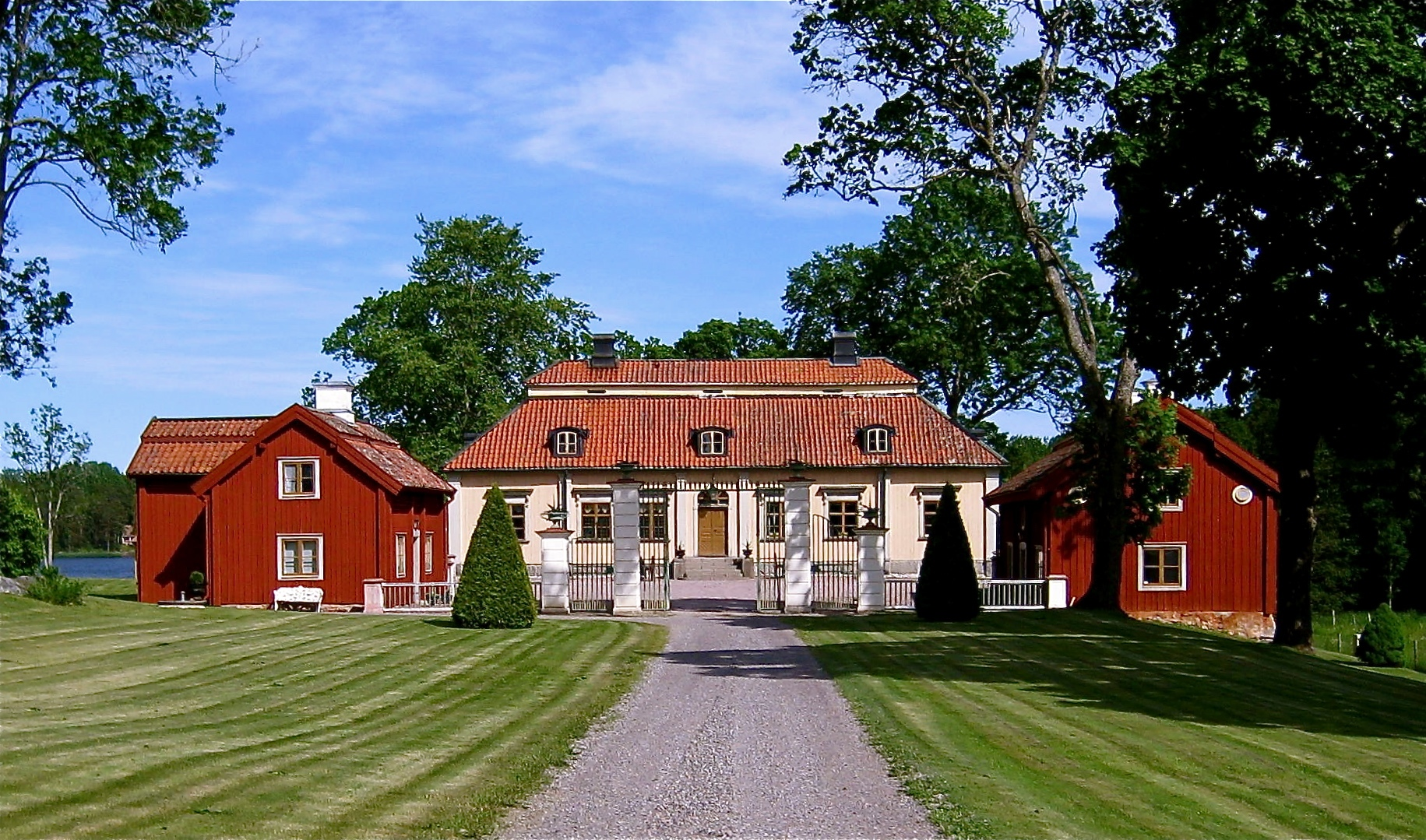
Stålboga manor house 2014. Photo by Nils Juto.

Stålboga was a well known farm back in the 15th century. In 1560, the farm is included on the road map commissioned by king Gustav I of Sweden. On the earliest known detailed map of the province of Södermanland (Behmebergkartan) from 1625 Stålboga is indicated as an iron mill. Stålboga Mill was officially founded in 1641 and the mansion was erected around this time. On 17 September 1650 Christina, Queen of Sweden issued a nobility letter for Stålboga Mill, which included tax exemption. The preserved document is issued on parchment with a large royal seal. From the late 17th century the land area of the property was approximately 5,000 hectares, with its own blast furnace and iron mine. The mansion burned down in 1870 and was not rebuilt until 1984-85.

The mill operation included rod iron forging, Lancashire pig iron, cannons and cannonballs, and carriages. A rolling mill was erected in the 19th century, and a railway station on the Stockholm to Eskilstuna line was built in the 1890s to promote goods transport from the mill. Mill operations stopped in the 1890s. The forest company Holmen bought Stålboga in 1910.

Dr. Juto and his wife Dr. Maria Juto, who died in 2011, bought the central part of the estate with 500 hectares in 1979. They bought and moved the 1680s Tunafors mansion house from Eskilstuna and placed it on the old Stålboga foundation.

== Music pavilion ==
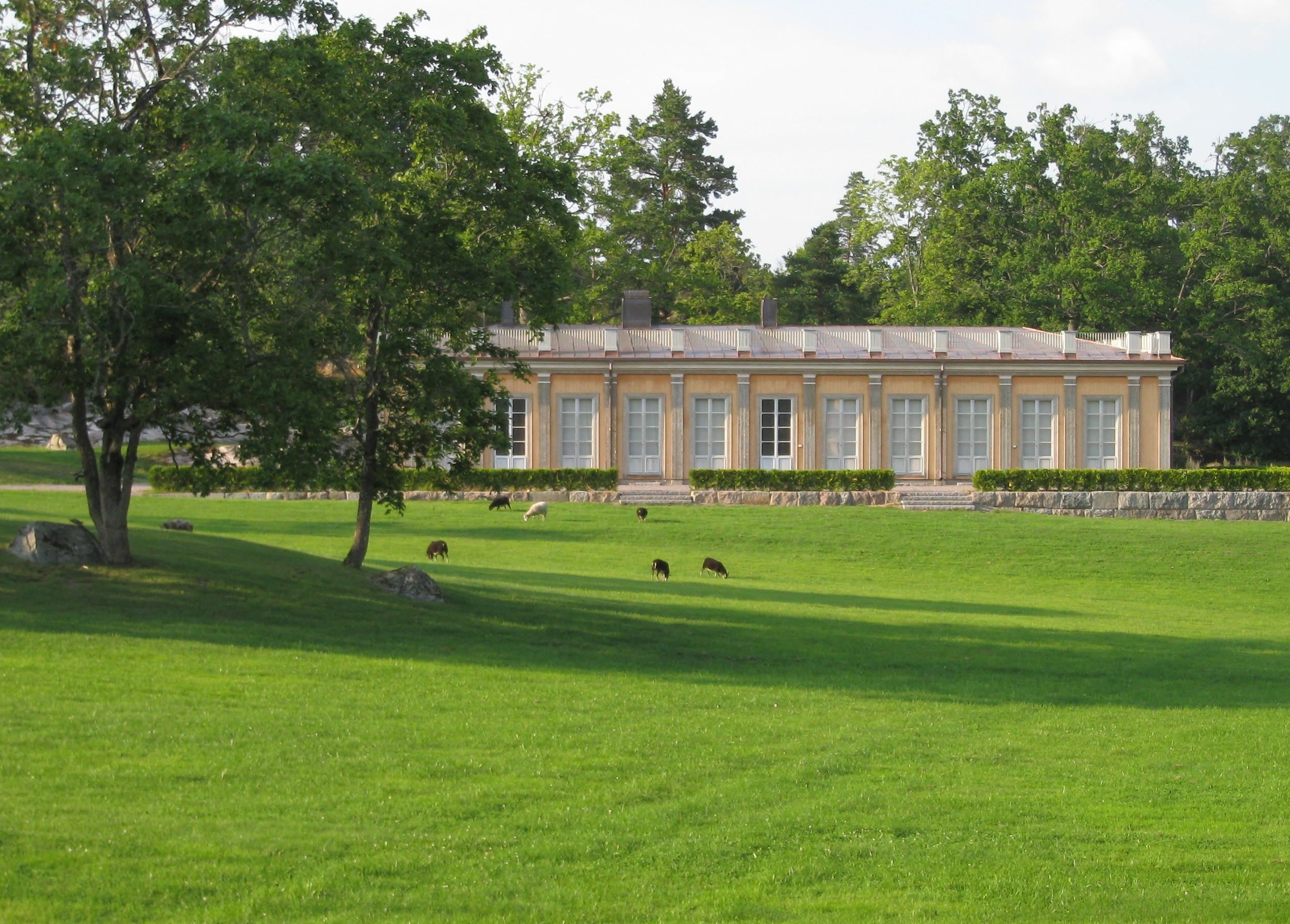
Stålboga pavilion 2014. Photo by Nils Juto.

Dr. Juto, ophthalmologist and an avid classical music fan, decided in 2005 to build a music pavilion on the Stålboga premises with the idea of staging intimate music events of the highest possible standard. As a starting point Dr. Juto was able to acquire the late 18th century state room interiors of the De Geer family's great city palace in Stockholm, razed in 1926 to make way for the new headquarters of Swedish industrialist Ivar Kreuger's match business, the predecessor of Swedish Match. The interiors were designed by the same interior designers that were at the same time designing the interior of the Royal Palace in Stockholm: Jean Eric Rehn, Jean Baptiste Masreliez, Adrien Masreliez, Christoffer Gjörwell and Nicodemus Tessin the Elder. At the time of construction of the music pavilion the interior decorations had then been stored for 80 years at the De Geer family's estate at Lövstabruk.

The exterior of the music pavilion is inspired by the orangerie at the Ulriksdal Palace and Gustav III's Pavilion, both near Stockholm.

The pavilion was built by the same carpenters who rebuilt the dome of Katarina Church in Stockholm after the fire in 1990, with Swedish timber from Dalarna using 18th century methods, including hand forged nails. The pavilion was developed with advice from the company responsible for the acoustics of the Gothenburg Opera.

== Summer opera ==
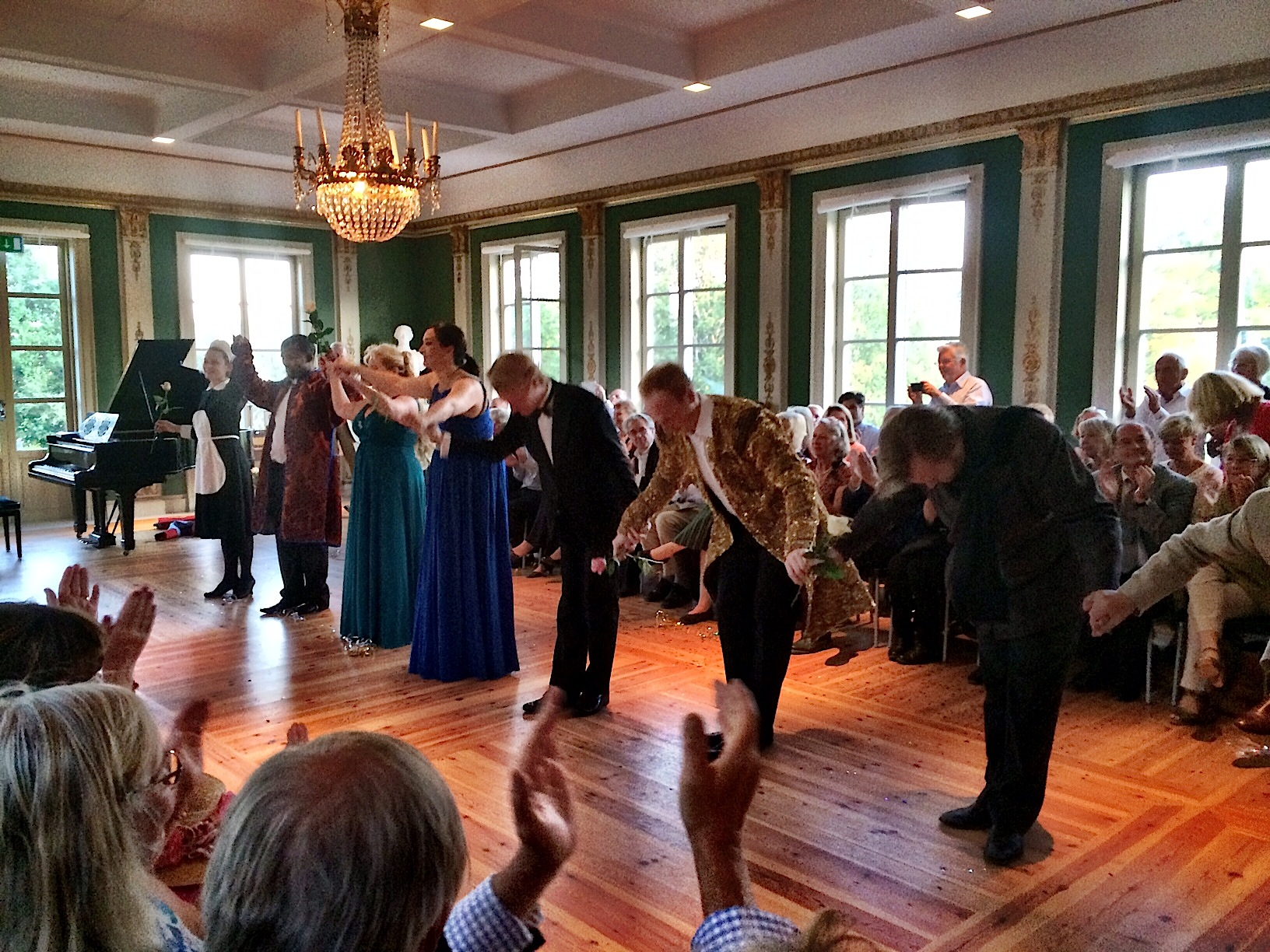
Cosí fan tutte, 7 September 2014

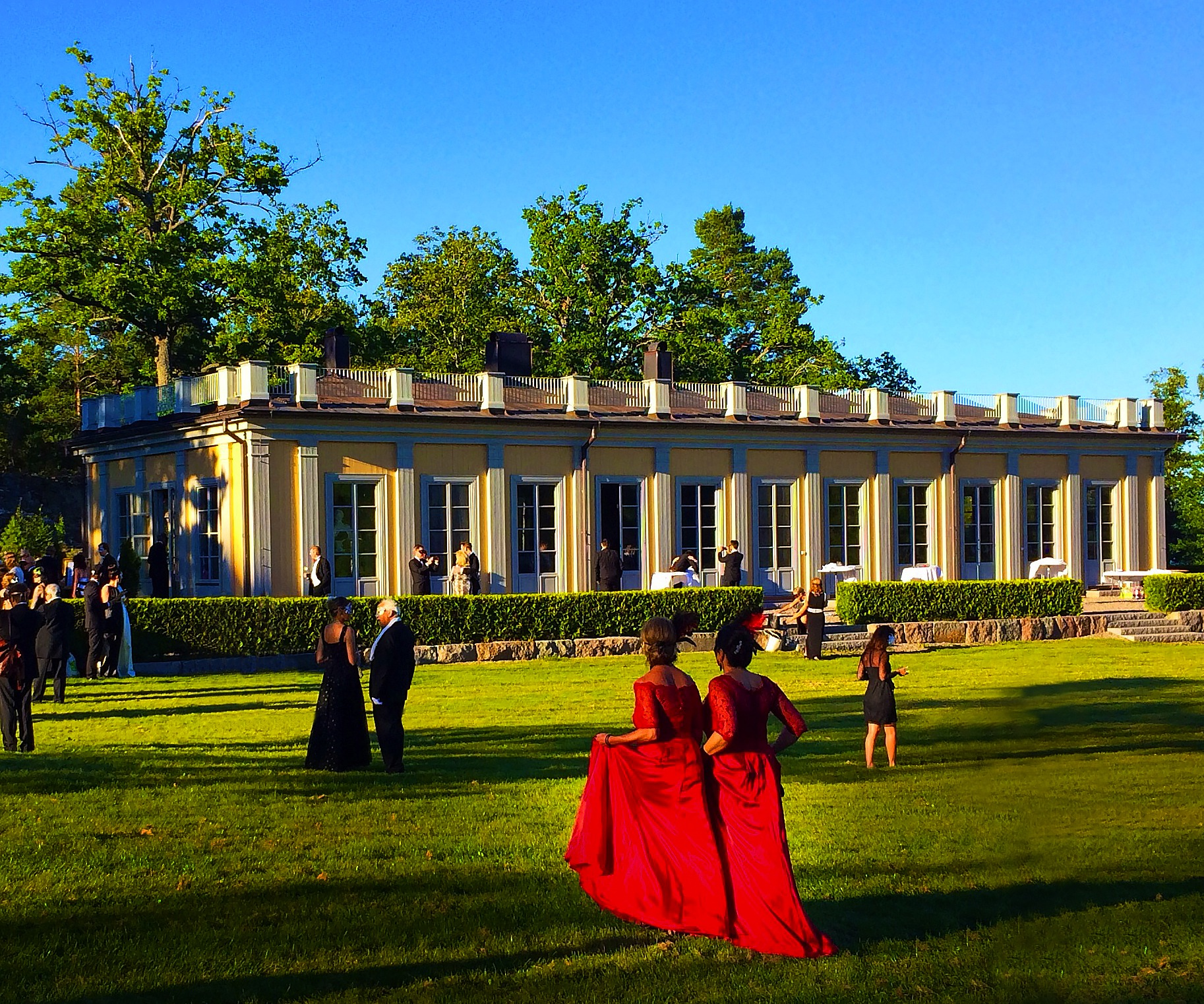
Stålboga pavilion 15 August 2015; intermission

The Summer Opera started in 2013 as an independent project sponsored by Dr. Juto, the owner of the Stålboga Manor House. The opera concept usually includes dinner and wine in the ticket price.

Given the limited size of the music pavilion, the total number of singers cannot readily exceed ten at the most. Also, the space available for the orchestra is very limited. Management has therefore chosen a repertoire with limited cast and orchestra requirements, and has strived to find plots that harmonize with the intimate character of the 17th century interior. For the first seasons the orchestral part has been played on piano and cembalo, with the piano confined to arias and the cembalo used for the recitative.

The productions at Stålboga have included opera singers such as soprano Hillevi Martinpelto, mezzo Katarina Karnéus, the 1995 winner of the biennial BBC Cardiff Singer of the World competition, and the young rising star baritone Luthando Qave who made his Metropolitan debut at age 25. The director for the first productions was the former Opera Director of Drottningholm Palace Theatre, Per-Erik Öhrn. In 2016 the Director was Mattias Ermedahl who is also a soloist baryton at GöteborgsOperan.

| Year | Opera | Composer | Director |
|---|---|---|---|
| 2013 | Don Giovanni | Wolfgang Amadeus Mozart | Per-Erik Öhrn |
| 2014 | Così fan tutte | Wolfgang Amadeus Mozart | Per-Erik Öhrn |
| 2015 | Così fan tutte | Wolfgang Amadeus Mozart | Per-Erik Öhrn |
| 2016 | La Serva Padrona/ Dido and Aeneas | Giovanni Battista Pergolesi/ Henry Purcell | Mattias Ermedahl |
