= Mavra =

One-act opera by Igor Stravinsky

- Comic opera by Igor Stravinsky
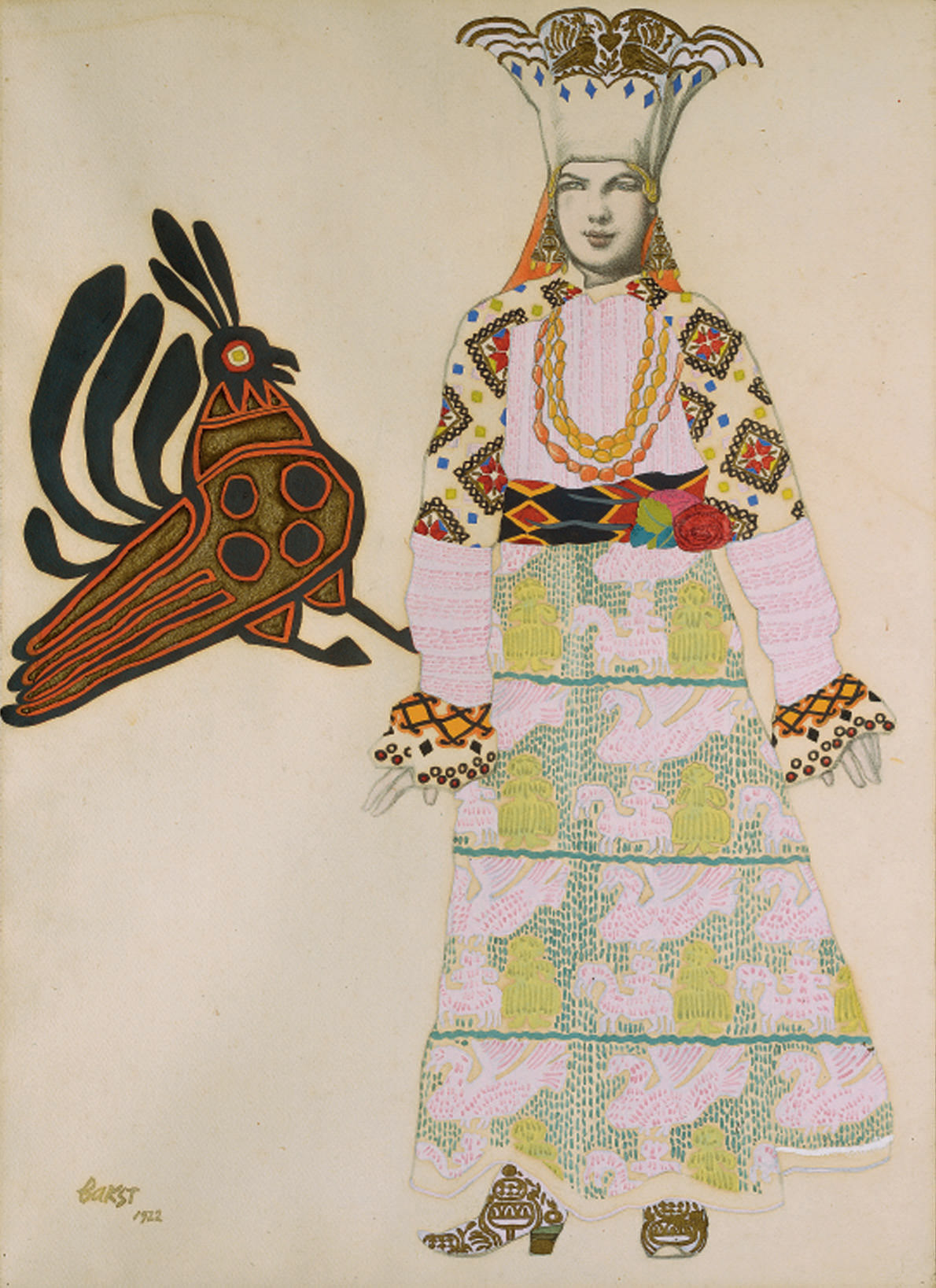
- Sketch of a costume by Léon Bakst
- Librettist: Boris Kochno
- Language: Russian
- Based on: The Little House in Kolomna by Aleksandr Pushkin
- Premiere: 3 June 1922; Théâtre de l'Opéra Paris

Mavra (Russian: Мавра) is a one-act comic opera composed by Igor Stravinsky, and one of the earliest works of Stravinsky's neo-classical period. The libretto, by Boris Kochno, is based on Alexander Pushkin's The Little House in Kolomna. Mavra is about 25 minutes long, and features two arias, a duet, and a quartet performed by its cast of four characters. The opera has been characterised as both an homage to Russian writers, and a satire of bourgeois manners and the Romeo and Juliet subgenre of romance. Philip Truman has also described the music as satirising 19th-century comic opera. The dedication on the score is to the memory of Pushkin, Glinka and Pyotr Ilyich Tchaikovsky.

Mavra premiered at the Théatre national de l'Opéra in Paris on 3 June 1922, under the auspices of Sergei Diaghilev, staged and choreographed by Bronislava Nijinska, conducted by Grzegorz Fitelberg, and with Oda Slobodskaya, Stefan Belina-Skupevsky, Zoya Rozovskaya, and Yelena Sadoven in the original cast. The opera was a failure at the premiere, partly because the large space of the Paris Opéra overwhelmed the small scale of the opera. One critic, Émile Vuillermoz, so enraged Stravinsky that he cut the review out and pasted it onto his manuscript copy.

Stravinsky himself thought very highly of this composition, saying once that "Mavra seems to me the best thing I've done". Erik Satie praised the work after its premiere. The composer reacted with hostility to people who criticized it in later years.

The opera was given its United States premiere by the Philadelphia Grand Opera Company at the Academy of Music, Philadelphia on December 28, 1934 with Maria Kurenko as Parasha and Alexander Smallens conducting. The Santa Fe Opera mounted Mavra in 1962.

The first aria of the work has been arranged for cello and piano, and recorded with Mstislav Rostropovich under the title "Russian Song".

== Synopsis ==
Place: Russian village
Time: Circa 1840

Parasha is in love with her neighbour, Vassili, a young hussar, but they have difficulty in meeting. After they sing a duet, Vassili leaves, and then Parasha's mother enters. She is lamenting the difficulty of finding a new maid-servant after their prior maid-servant, Thecla, died. The mother orders her daughter to find a new maid-servant. Parasha comes up with a scheme to smuggle Vassili into her house disguised as Mavra, a female maid-servant. The ruse initially succeeds, and Parasha and Vassili are happy at being under the same roof. Parasha and her mother go out for a walk. At one moment, Vassili shaves. The ladies return, disconcerted to see their new maid-servant shaving. Vassili escapes out the window, her mother faints, the next door neighbour rushes in to try to help, and Parasha laments the loss of her young love.

== Roles ==
Role	Voice type	Premiere cast, 3 June 1922 (Conductor: Gregor Fitelberg)
Parasha	soprano	Oda Slobodskaya
Her mother	contralto	Zoïa Rosowska
The neighbour	mezzo soprano	Yelena Sadoven
Vassili (Mavra)	tenor	Stefan Belina-Skupevsky

== Numbers ==
1. Overture
2. Parasha's song
3. Hussar's gypsy song
4. Dialogue
5. The mother's song
6. Dialogue
7. Duet
8. Dialogue
9. Quartet
10. Dialogue
11. Duet
12. Dialogue
13. Mavra's song
14. Coda

== Recordings ==
- Columbia 72609: Susan Belinck, Mary Simmons, Patricia Rideout, Stanley Kolk; CBC Symphony Orchestra; Igor Stravinsky, conductor
- Decca: Joan Carlyle, Helen Watts, Monica Sinclair, Kenneth Macdonald; L'Orchestre de la Suisse Romande; Ernest Ansermet, conductor
- Chandos CHA 9488: Tatyana Kravtsova, Olga Korzhenskaya, Olga Markova-Mikhailenko, Alexei Martynov; Netherlands Wind Ensemble; Thierry Fischer, conductor
- BMC 118: Maria Fontosh, Ludmila Schemtschuk, Lili Paasikivi, Valerij Serkin; German Youth Philharmonic, Gothenburg Symphony; Péter Eötvös, conductor
