= Per-Erik Öhrn =

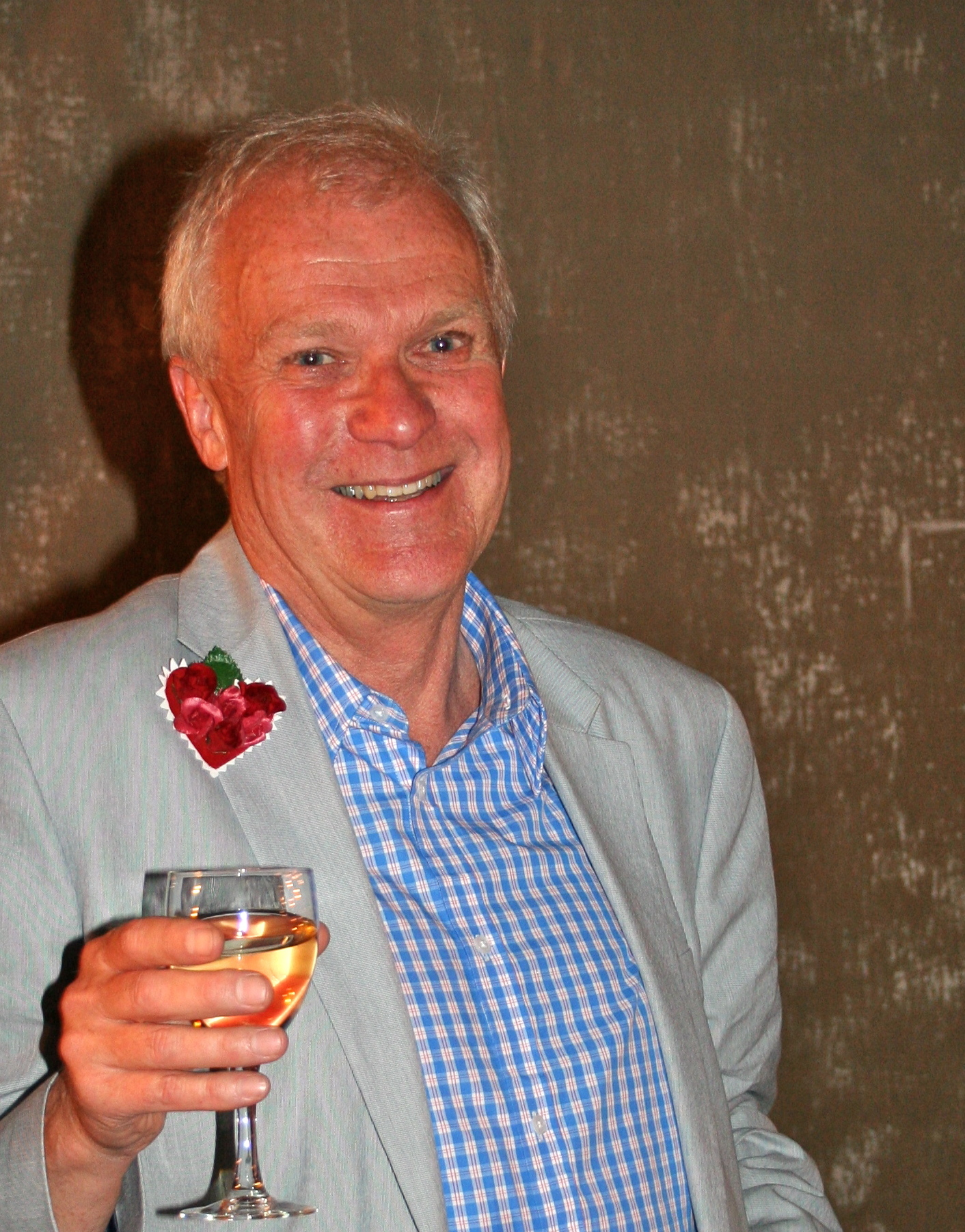
Per-Erik Öhrn 2014

Per-Erik Lennart Öhrn (born 18 October 1946) is a Swedish opera and theatre director, opera singer, actor, professor, translator and artistic director.

Öhrn grew up in Malmö and trained as an opera singer (baritone) at the School of Music and Drama at the University of Gothenburg. He has worked as an actor at Östgötateatern in Linköping, at Uppsala Stadsteater and as a singer and director of Stora Teatern in Gothenburg and at Norrlandsoperan in Umeå. He has directed over fifty productions at Vadstena Academy, Norrlandsoperan, National Swedish Touring Theatre, Sveriges Television, Drottningholm Palace Theatre, Stora Teatern, Malmö Opera and Music Theatre and other theatres. Öhrn has also translated operas of among other Mozart, Rossini, Haydn, Domenico Cimarosa, Kurt Weill, Jacques Offenbach, Antonín Dvořák and Alfred Schnittke. Through the years Öhrn has also worked to highlight older, less known or rarely played operas; such as Wilhelm Stenhammar's Tirfing at Malmö Opera and Music Theatre in 2011.

He has been artistic director of the Vadstena Academy in 1986–91, Norrlandsoperan in 1977–78 and 1988–96 and the Drottningholm Palace Theatre in 1997–2006. He has been professor in the music-dramatic arts at the School of Music and Drama at the University of Gothenburg since 2002 and also teaches at University College of Opera, Stockholm. Öhrn helped found the Fäviken Opera Festival in the summer of 2007 with the staging of Cimarosa's The Poor Guy Got Married. During his time as head of the Drottningholm Palace Theatre, he ordered for the first time since the 1700s a newly written opera, by Jonas Forssell and Reine Jönsson.

In 2013 and 2014 Öhrn directed Mozart's Don Giovanni and Così fan tutte at Stålboga Summer Opera.

== Bibliography ==
- Bakom kulisserna, Föreningen för tidig musik, Per-Erik Öhrn / Daniel Blockert, Sara Norling

== Recordings ==
- Operett på Storan : Csardasfurstinnan, Boccaccio, Fågelhandlaren (English translation: Light opera at the Grand Theatre: Die Csárdásfürstin, Boccaccio, Der Vogelhändler), 2001, Philips : 6316 085

== Filmography ==
- Zoroastre (2006 TV Movie) (artistic director)
