= Thekla Hofer =

Swedish opera singer

Thekla Catharina Charlotta Hofer née Falck (1852–1938) was a Swedish operatic soprano and later voice teacher. She made her début at the Royal Swedish Opera in 1879 as Rosina in The Barber of Seville. In addition to performing in various theatres in Sweden, she was a highly applauded guest in Weimar, St Petersburg and Riga. In the mid-1990s, she retired from the stage to teach with pupils including Signe Rappe and Karin Branzell.

== Early life and education ==
Born in Gothenburg on 10 January 1852, Thekla Catherina Charlotta Falck was the daughter of the cigar master Evert Mauritz Falk and his wife Gustava Charlotta née Rosenlöf. She married the German-born bass opera singer Theodor Hofer. She first studied piano under Hilda Thegerström before becoming a voice pupil of Adelaïde Leuhusen. She completed her voice training in Paris under the tenor Pierre-François Wartel.

== Career ==
Hofer made her début in 1879 at the Royal Swedish Opera as Rosina in The Barber of Seville, receiving an engagement for the following season. She became a successful performer not only here but as a guest in Helsinki, in Gothenburg's Stora Teatern, Weimar's Hoftheater and St Petersburg's Imperial Mariinsky Theatre. In 1888, as a guest in Riga, she played in Suppé's operetta Die schöne Galathée. Among her finest parts were the title role in La Traviata, Olympia, Giulietta and Antonia in The Tales of Hoffmann, Amina in La sonnambula and Micaëla in Carmen.

In the mid-1890s, Hofer retired from the stage to devote the remainder of her career to teaching. Among the celebrated singers who emerged from her school until she retired in 1923 were Signe Rappe, Karin Branzell, Ruth Althén, Irma Björck and the tenor Folke Andersson.

Thekla Hofer died in Strängnäs on 14 June 1938.
