= Signe Rappe-Welden =

Swedish opera singer

Signe Rappe-Welden (1909)

Signe Rappe-Welden née Rappe (24 September 1879 – 21 May 1974) was a Swedish operatic soprano and voice teacher. She made her dëbut in 1906 in Mannheim, acclaimed for both her voice and acting ability. She performed in Vienna from 1908 to 1911 and received the title of court singer in Sweden in 1909. Her most successful role was that of Salome in Covent Garden in 1910, which she later performed with Richard Strauss as conductor. After a short period with the Royal Swedish Opera (1912–1913), she went on to give concerts in Europe and the United States.

== Early life and education ==
Born in Stockholm on 24 September 1879, Signe Rappe was the daughter of General Axel Rappe (1838–1918) and his wife Anna née Sandahl (1855–1946). She was the second in a family of five children. On 30 December 1912, she married the pianist Sigge Heribert Lundén-Welden (1880–1959) with whom she had four children. She studied voice under the Swedish opera singer Thekla Hofer and later in Berlin under the German Therese Schnabel and the Hungarian Etelka Gerster.

== Career ==
Rappe-Welden's Swedish début was at a concert performance in Jönköping in 1902 as Delila in Handel's Samson. She went on to perform in concerts in Copenhagen, including the soprano parts from Mendelsohn's Elijah. Her operatic début was in 1906 in Mannheim where she appeared periodically from 1906 to 1908. She then performed as a guest in Berlin, Cologne, Stuttgart, Wiesbaden and Strasbourg. She was engaged by the Vienna Opera from 1908 to 1911 and by the Royal Swedish Opera from 1912 to 1913. She appeared as a guest in London at Covent Garden and at the Albert Hall, at the Paris Opera, and in New York and Chicago. She also went on tour in Sweden and Norway.

Among her successful roles were Salome, Elisabeth and Venus in Tannhäuser, Elisa in Lohengrin, Senta in The Flying Dutchman, Eva in The Master Singers, Rezia in Oberon, Aida, Desdemona in Otello and Marguerite in Faust. As a concert performer, she was particularly fond of singing music by Bach. She completed her career by teaching voice in Stockholm.

Signe Rappe-Welden died on 21 May 1974 in Danderyd.

== Awards ==
In 1909, Rappe-Welden received the title of Hovsångerska (court singer) and in 1914 she was awarded the Litteris et Artibus.
