= Tove Dahlberg =

Swedish opera singer

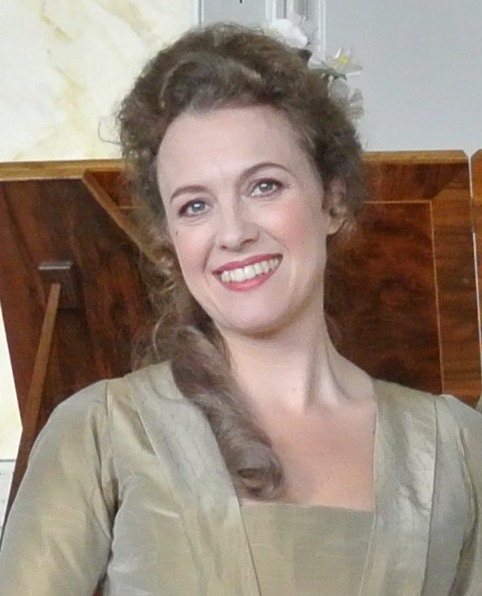

Background information
- Born: Hanna Tove Dahlberg; April 25, 1973 (age 53); Stockholm, Sweden
- Genre: Opera
- Occupation: Mezzo-soprano singer
- Website: www.tovedahlberg.com

Hanna Tove Dahlberg (born April 25, 1973 in Stockholm) is a Swedish mezzo-soprano opera singer, active on the international opera scene. In 2005 Dahlberg was one of a group of world-class musicians who were permitted to perform inside a building at Auschwitz for the first time ever during the filming of the International Emmy Award winning TV documentary Holocaust: A Music Memorial Film.

== Education ==
Dahlberg attended Adolf Fredrik's Music School in Stockholm. She then studied jazz singing at the Royal College of Music in Stockholm before starting her opera singer training - first at Opera Studio 67 in Stockholm, and then until 2002 at the University College of Opera, also in Stockholm. Subsequently, she was admitted at the Covent Garden opera's two year Vilar Young Artists Programme (later renamed Jette Parker Young Artists Programme) in London.

== Career ==
Dahlberg debuted on the Royal Swedish Opera as Cherubino in Mozart’s The Marriage of Figaro. Subsequently, she has primarily worked on opera and concert stages outside Sweden. In Europe, she has performed in, among other things, Royal Opera House in London, Glyndebourne, La Monnaie Opera House in Brussels, Opera de Lyon, the Aix-en-Provence Festival and the Maggio Musicale in Florence. In the United States, she has sung at the Mostly Mozart Festival at Avery Fisher Hall at the Lincoln Center in New York, with the San Francisco Symphony and the Chicago Opera Theater. In Asia, she has sung with the English baroque orchestra Academy of Ancient Music at the Macau International Music Festival.

Among conductors Tove Dahlberg has worked with Sir Antonio Pappano, William Christie, Semyon Bychkov, Sir Charles Mackerras, Jane Glover and Kazushi Ono.

Dahlberg has performed in the title roles in Debussy's Pelléas et Mélisande, Boesmans’ Julie, and Scarlatti's Il Tigrane. Among other roles on international scenes she has sung Dorabella in Mozart's Così fan tutte, Fyodor in Mussorgsky's Boris Godunov and Hermia in Britten's A Midsummer Night's Dream.

At Folkoperan in Sweden Dahlberg has sung roles such as Cleopatra in Handel's Giulio Cesare, Siebel in Gounod's Faust and Valencienne in Lehár's The Merry Widow.

On other Swedish scenes Dahlberg has performed in several opera roles written for specifically her, among them Calypso, Eurycleia and Helena in Reine Jönsson's Return to Ithaka (Swedish title: Strändernas svall) at Vadstena Academy. She has also portrayed opera singer Moster in Paula af Malmborg Ward’s one act Would you like a frosty pear?. At the Drottningholm Palace Theatre she sang the role of Linnaeus's Daughter Lisa Stina in Jonas Forssell’s The Garden.

Tove Dahlberg's repertoire as concert and oratory singer includes Mozart's Great Mass in C minor and Requiem, Bach's Christmas Oratorio, Mass in B minor and St John Passion, Rossini's Stabat mater, Pergolesi's Stabat mater and Vivaldi's Gloria.

Both the French music television channel Mezzo and SVT have shown the Lyon Opera production of Mozart's Cosi fan tutte with Dahlberg in the role of Dorabella. On the BBC music channel Radio 3 she has participated in a number of solo performances. She was also one of the soloists in BBC's In memory of Auschwitz, a European co-production, which in 2005 was awarded with an Emmy as best cultural film, later released on DVD.

Dahlberg lives in Stockholm.

== Awards and scholarships ==
Tove Dahlberg has received numerous scholarships and awards. Among them are:

- 2000: Received Kristina Nilsson’s scholarship
- 2000: Received stipend from OperaVännerna, The Friends of the Royal Swedish Opera in Stockholm
- 2005: Received the Glyndebourne Promis Award (for Mélisande in Pelléas and Mélisande)
- 2005-06: Nominated for Award as Best Female Comic, PrimiDivi Opera Awards 2005-2006 (for Hermia in A Midsummer Night's Dream at Covent Garden opera)

== Discography ==
- Debussy – The Martyrdom Of Saint Sebastian, Label: BBC Music Magazine – BBCMM341, BBC Music Magazine – Vol. 20 No. 5
- Benjamin Britten - A Midsummer Night's Dream - complete, Format: 2-CD Set, Label: Glyndebourne, Conductor: Ilan Volkov, Artists: Bejun Mehta, Kate Royal, Tove Dahlberg, Iride Martinez, Release Date: 31-Oct-2011
- Wolfgang Amadeus Mozart - Mass in C minor, Format: CD, Label: Coro, Conductor: Harry Christophers, Artists: Gillian Keith, Tove Dahlberg, Thomas Cooley, Nathan Berg, Release Date: 31-Aug-2010

== Filmography ==
- Holocaust: A Music Memorial Film (2005), available as DVD Video, PAL, 16:9, Color, Time: 88 mns, Copyright for the DVD edition by BBC & Auschwitz-Birkenau State Museum
