= Maria Fontosh =

Ukrainian-Russian opera singer (born 1976)

Maria Fontosh (born 5 June 1976) is a Ukrainian born Russian soprano residing in Sweden. She made her debut as Rosina in The Barber of Seville in 2001 at the Royal Opera House in Stockholm, which was also broadcast on national TV.

== Early life and education ==
Fontosh was born in Ukraine but grew up in Russia where she studied piano, singing and conducting. After moving to Sweden she conducted studies at the Falun Conservatory of Music, the Royal Swedish Academy of Music (Kungliga Musikaliska Akademien) and the University College of Opera (Operahögskolan). Fontosh graduated from the University College of Opera in Stockholm in December 2001.

== Career ==
In 1999, Fontosh won 3rd prize in the Mirjam Helin International Singing Competition in Helsinki. In 2002 she won the third prize in Plácido Domingo's Operalia International Opera Competition in Paris.

On 5 September 2007, Fontosh sang at the Värmland Classic Festival together with José Carreras, among the pieces was Franz Lehár's The Merry Widow.

== Recent stage roles ==
- Lauretta, La conversazione and I rivali delusi (intermezzi by Niccolò Jommelli) (1999, Vadstena Academy)
- Rosina, The Barber of Seville (2001/2002, Royal Swedish Opera)
- Musetta, La bohème (2001/2002, Royal Swedish Opera)
- Zerlina, Don Giovanni (2002, The Ruhr Triennale)
- Fiordiligi, Così fan tutte (Frankfurt Opera House)
- Adina, L'elisir d'amore (Frankfurt Opera House)
- Zerlina, Don Giovanni (Frankfurt Opera House)
- Ginevra, Ariodante (Frankfurt Opera House)
- Marie, The Bartered Bride (2003/2004, Royal Swedish Opera)
- Marguerite, Faust (2005, Malmö Opera)
- Ginevra, Ariodante (2005, Frankfurt Opera House)
- Tatyana, Eugene Onegin (2005, Royal Swedish Opera)
- Musetta, La bohème (2005, Opéra National de Paris)
- Marie, The Bartered Bride (2006, Frankfurt Opera House)
- Marzerlline, Fidelio (2006, El Teatro de Ópera de Valencia)
- Countess Almaviva, The Marriage of Figaro (2007, Frankfurt Opera House)
- Fiordiligi, Così fan tutte (2007, Royal Swedish Opera)
- Violetta, La traviata (2007, Royal Swedish Opera)
- Antonia, Les contes d'Hoffmann (2008, Teatro Nacional de São Carlos)
- Marguerite, Faust (2008, Frankfurt Opera House)
- Mimì, La bohème, 2008, Royal Swedish Opera
- Countess Almaviva, The Marriage of Figaro, 2010 Royal Swedish Opera

== Recordings ==
- Wolfgang Amadeus Mozart: Mitridate The Danish Radio Sinfonietta Universal 2002
- Puccini: Discoveries Decca 2004
- Igor Stravinsky: Le sacre du printemps / Mavra Budapest Music Center 2006
