= Irma Björck =

Swedish opera and operetta singer

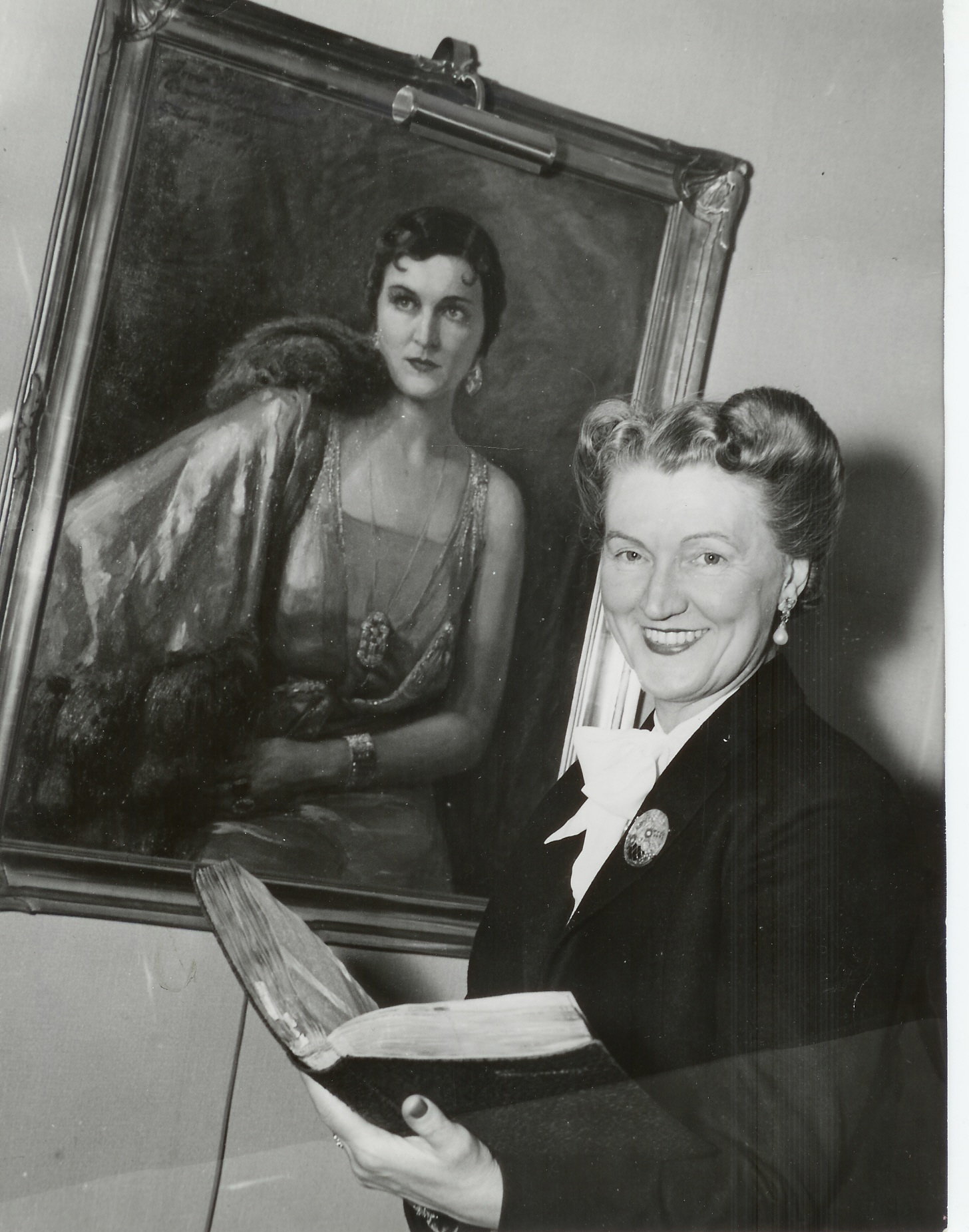
- Irma Björck, with her portrait as Die Csárdásfürstin
- Born: Irma Lovisa Krook; 14 December 1898; Stockholm, Sweden
- Died: 25 January 1993 (aged 94); Stockholm, Sweden
- Other names: Irma Lovisa Björck
- Education: Royal Swedish Opera School
- Occupations: opera and operetta singer
- Known for: Royal Swedish Opera
- Spouse: Gunnar Björck (m. 1918)
- Awards: Litteris et Artibus (1940), "hovsängerska" (1943)

Irma Lovisa Björck née Krook (1898–1993) was a Swedish mezzo-soprano opera and operetta singer. After training under Thekla Hofer and Gertrud Grubbstrom-Gronberg, with a year at the Royal Swedish Opera School, she made her début in 1925 at the Royal Swedish Opera as Nancy in Friedrich von Flotow's comic opera Martha. She performed regularly at the Royal Theatre until 1949. She was also successful as a concert performer. In 1918, Björck became a member of the Royal Swedish Academy of Music.

== Biography ==
Born in Stockholm on 14 December 1898, Irma Lovisa Krook was the daughter of the merchant Nils P. Krook and his wife Anna née Jacobsson. From 1816, she studied voice in Stockholm under Thekla Hofer, Gertrud Grubbstrom-Gronberg and Sigrid Terlizzi before spending a year at the Royal Swedish Opera School (1925–26). In 1918 she married Gunnar Björck, an army officer.

After making her début in Stockholm in 1925, as Nancy in Flowtow's Martha, she received an engagement with the Royal Opera the following year where she performed regularly until 1949. Her repertoire included both mezzo-soprano and dramatic soprano roles. Björck is remembered above all for her Wagnerian roles. They included Venus and Elisabeth in Tannhäuser, Brangäne in Tristan und Isolde and Brunhild in the Ring. She also played Verdi's Maddalena in Rigoletto, Eboli in Don Carlos and Amneris in Aida. In 1929, she took part in the Swedish première of Natanael Berg's Engelbrekt and in 1930 in the title role of Fried Walter's Drottning Elisabet. She performed as a guest in London, Copenhagen, Helsinki and Barcelona, singing Leonore in Fidelio, the title role in Tosca, Marina in Boris Godunov and Octavian in Der Rosenkavalier. Her operetta roles included Offenbach's Eurydice, Hélène and Fragoletto, as well as Franz von Suppé's Boccaccio and Emmerich Kálmán's Csárdásfürstin. She was also a great success when giving concerts.

Irma Björck died in Stockholm on 25 January 1993.

== Awards ==
In 1940, she received the Litteris et Artibus for her contribution to Swedish culture and in 1943 was awarded the title of "hovsängerska" (court singer).
