= Hillevi Martinpelto =

Swedish opera singer (born 1958)

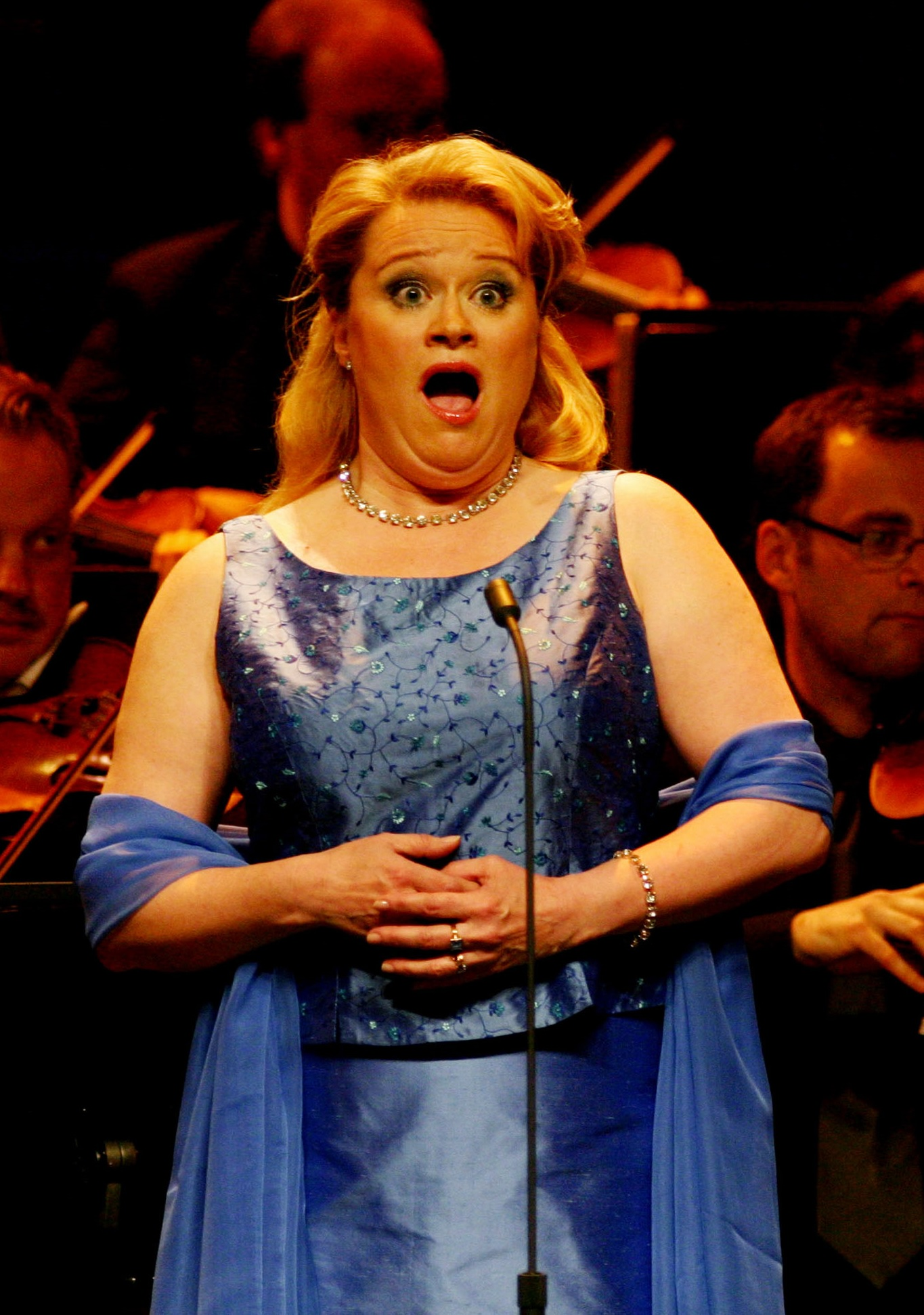
Martinpelto performs at the 2005 Polar Music Prize ceremony.

Hillevi Martinpelto (born 9 January 1958 in Älvdalen) is a Swedish lyric soprano. She made her debut in Madama Butterfly by Giacomo Puccini in 1987. She is best known for her work with John Eliot Gardiner and the Monteverdi Choir. With Gardiner, she recorded Weber's Oberon and Mozart's Le nozze di Figaro and Idomeneo, to considerable acclaim.

In the summer of 2014 Martinpelto performed at Stålboga Summer Opera.

Martinpelto's father is Finnish.

== Awards ==
- 2006: appointed Hovsångerska by H.M. the King of Sweden
