= Ulriksdal Palace =

Royal palace in Solna Municipality, Sweden

- Ulriksdals slott
- Front view of the palace.

- Location within Stockholm

General information
- Architectural style: Baroque
- Location: Solna, Sweden
- Coordinates: 59°23′25″N 18°01′01″E
- Construction started: 1638
- Completed: 1645

Design and construction
- Architects: Hans Jacob Kristler, Nicodemus Tessin the Elder, Carl Hårleman

Website
- RoyalCourt.se

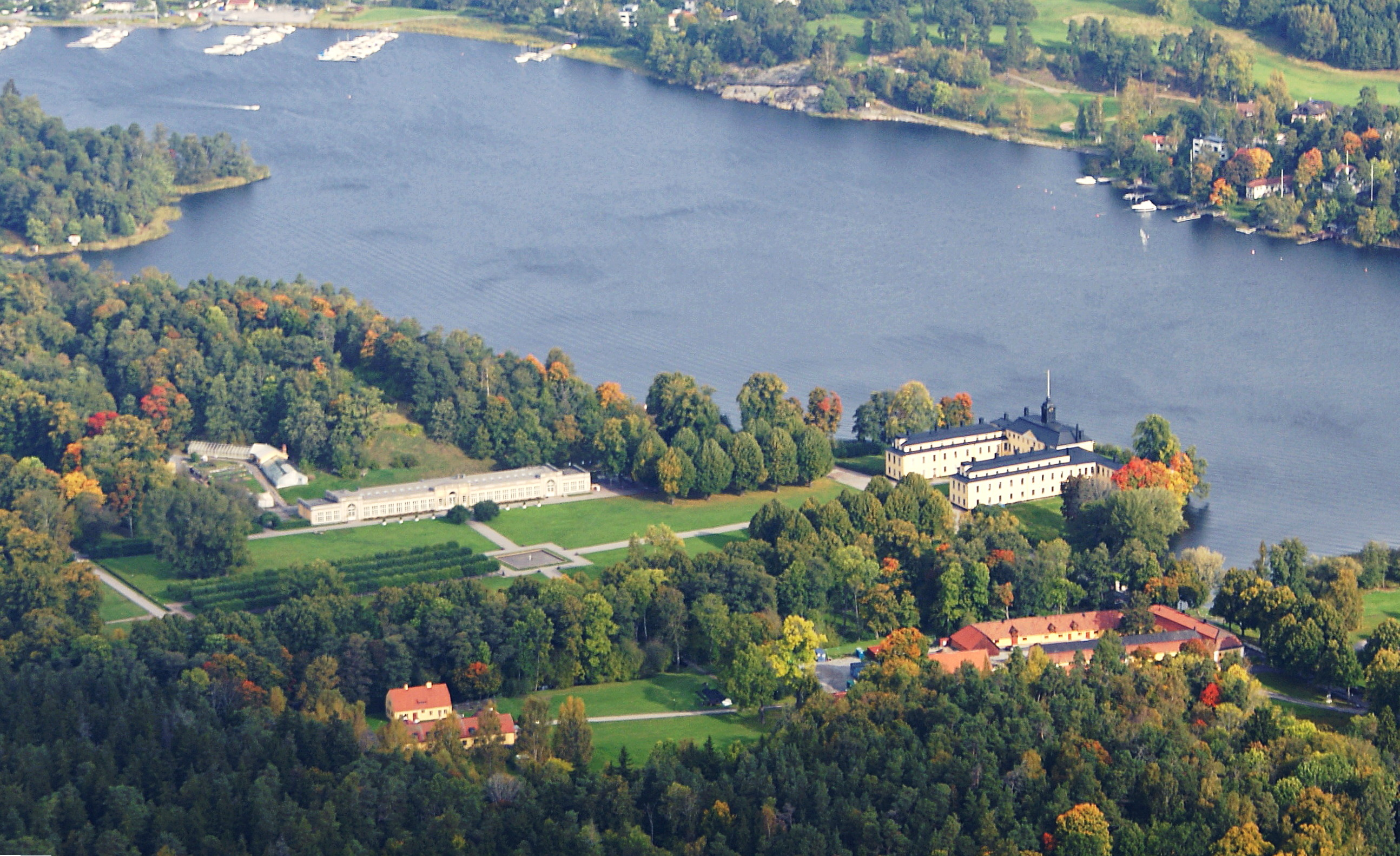
Aerial view of the palace

Ulriksdal Palace (Swedish: Ulriksdals slott) is a royal palace situated on the banks of the Edsviken in the Royal National City Park in Solna Municipality, 6 km north of Stockholm. It was originally called Jakobsdal for its owner Jacob De la Gardie, who had it built by architect Hans Jacob Kristler in 1638–1645 as a country retreat. He later passed on to his son, Magnus Gabriel De la Gardie, from whom it was purchased in 1669 by Queen Hedvig Eleonora of Sweden. The present design is mainly the work of architect Nicodemus Tessin the Elder and dates from the late 17th century.

== History ==
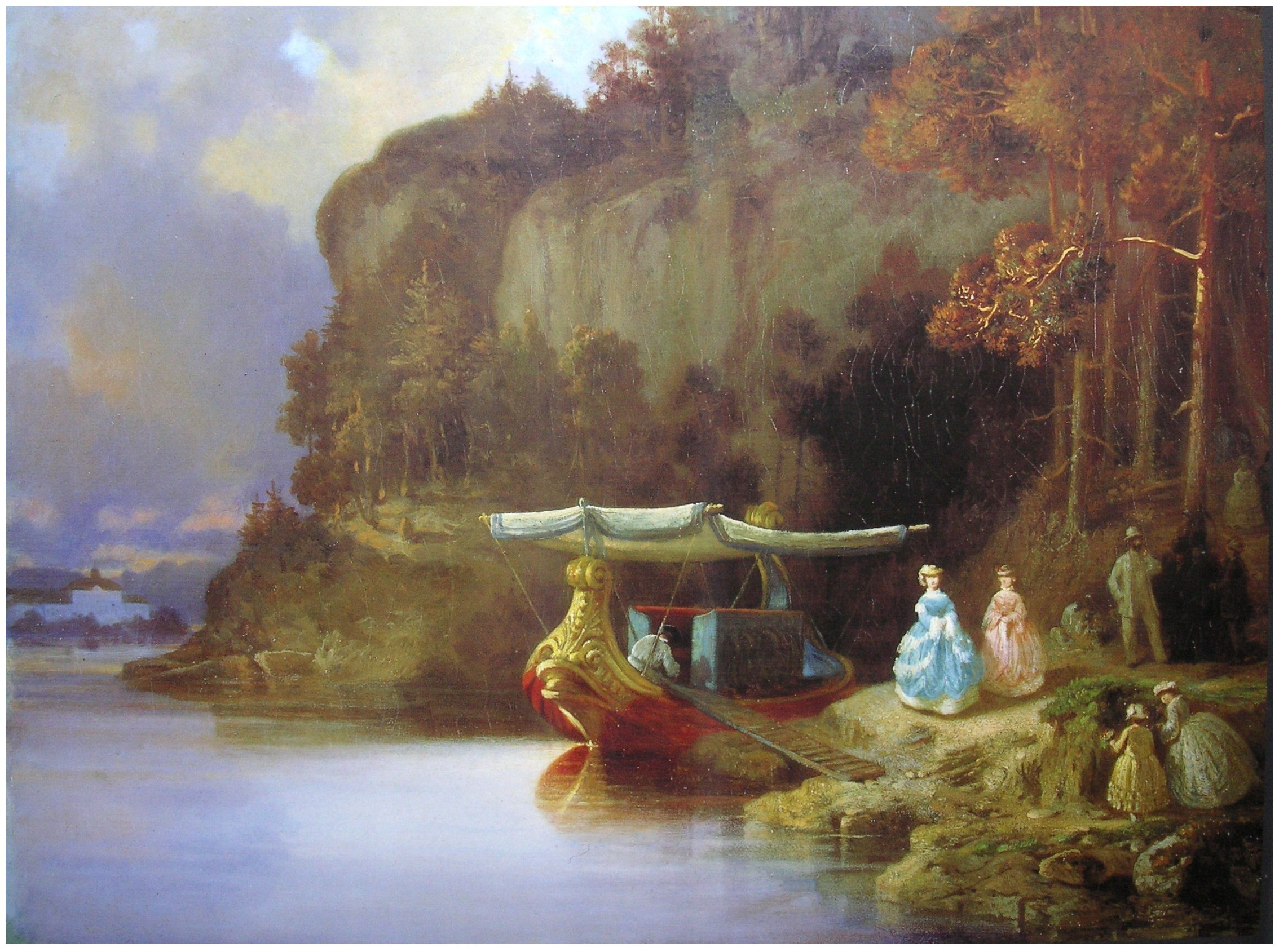
Edsviken in 1865, by Johan Christoffer Boklund, featuring Ulriksdal Palace on its lefthand side.

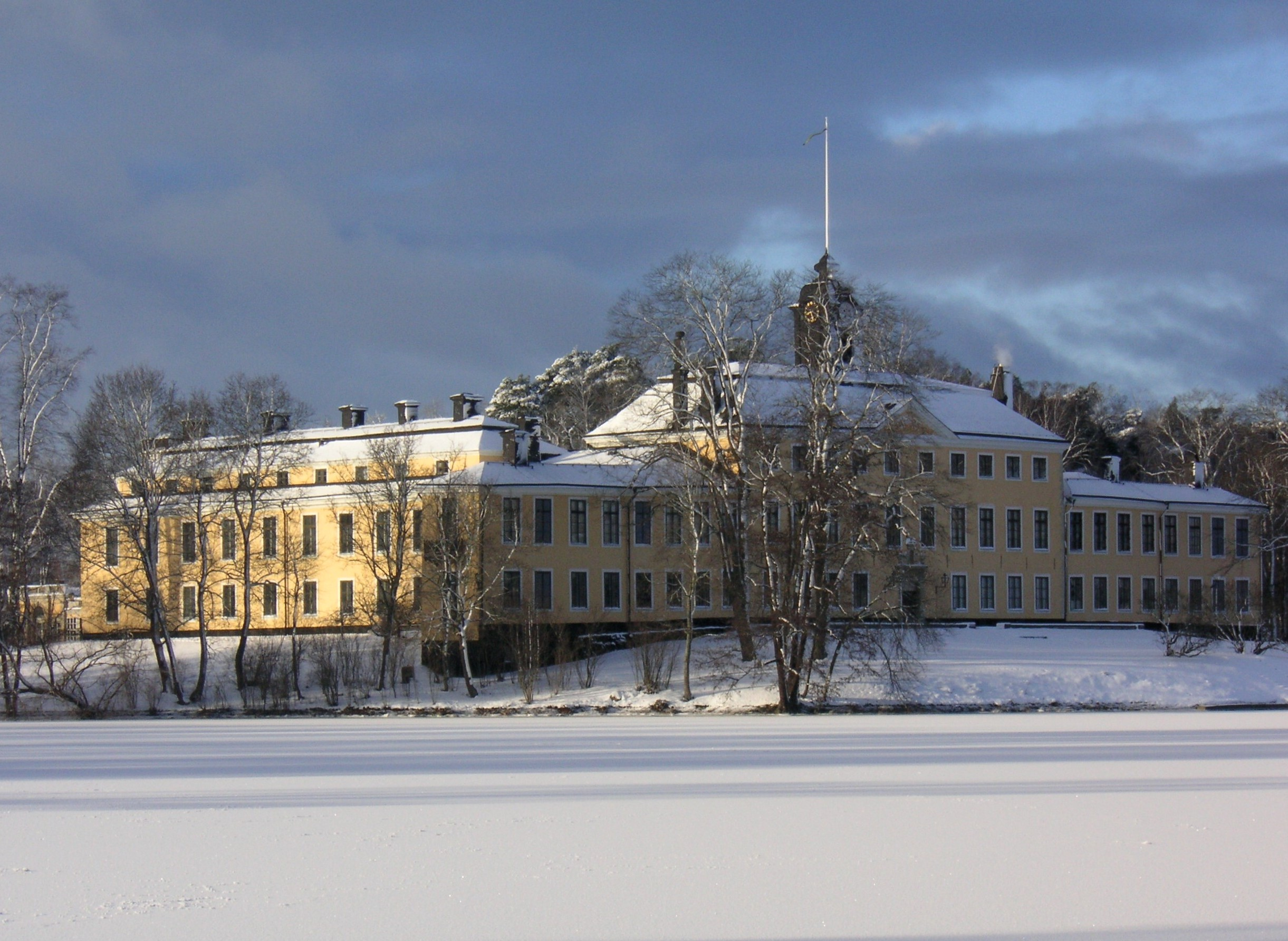
The Palace seen from the Edsviken in January 2007.

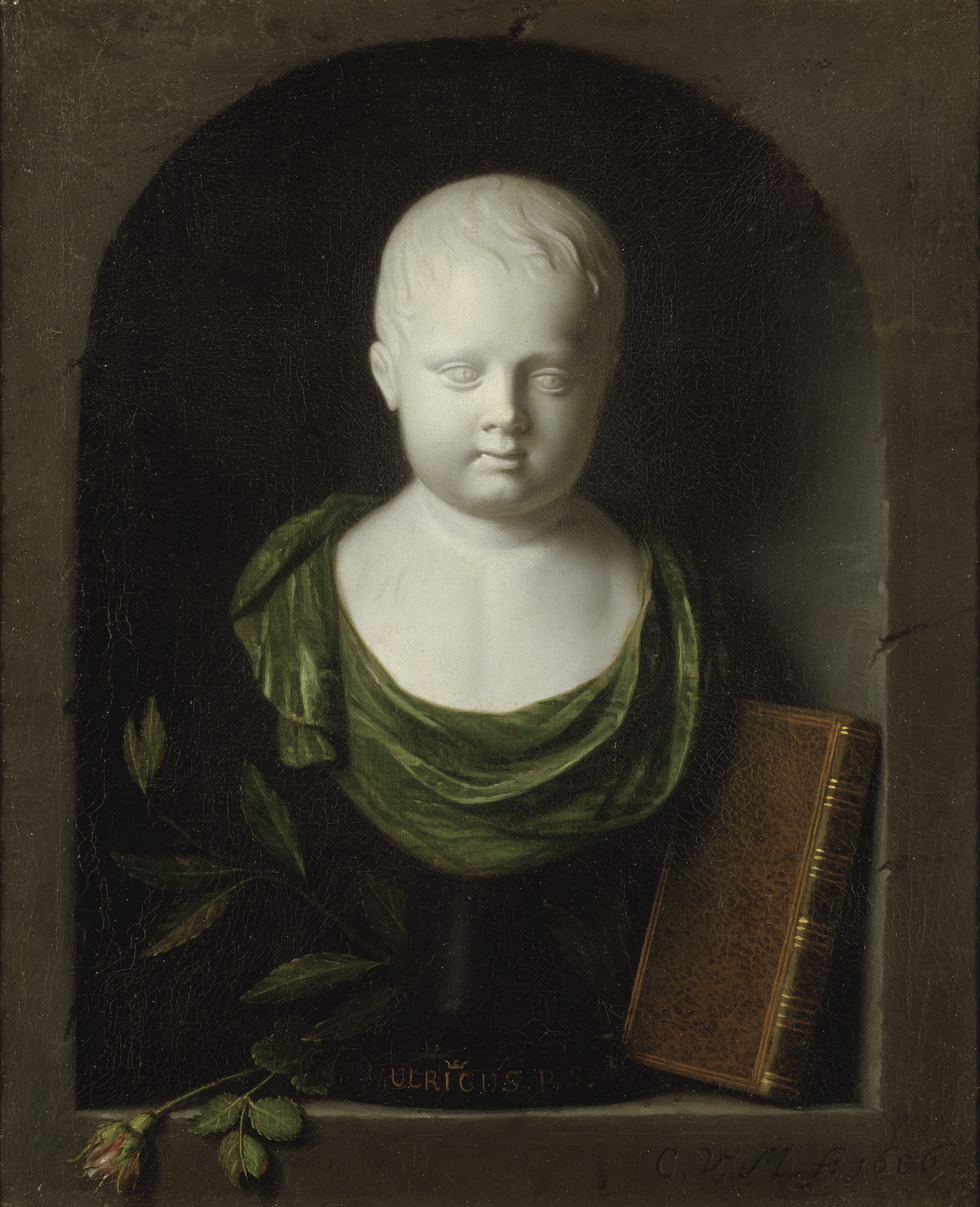
Prince Ulric (1684–1685)

Hedvig Eleonora had grand plans for the palace and renamed it in 1684 Ulriksdal in honor of its intended future owner, her grandson Prince Ulric. The prince, however, died at the age of one and Hedvig Eleonora kept the palace until her death in 1715 when the property was transferred to the crown for King Frederick I's disposal.

Several drawings by Nicodemus Tessin the Elder show a stately palace, three storeys high, with a lantern roof, furnished attic, and side wings extending the lakeside façade. Implementation of Tessin's designs began under Hedvig Eleonora in the 1670s, but was halted around 1690 due to financial problems.

When building work eventually resumed by King Frederick I in the 1720s, the palace architect Carl Hårleman had different ideas than Tessin the Elder. Among the features incorporated by Hårleman was one of the first mansard roofs in Sweden. In the mid-18th century, the palace was occupied by King Adolf Frederick and Queen Louisa Ulrika. The Queen set up a theatre here, today called the Confidencen. During the reign of Adolf Frederick and his son Gustav III (r. 1771–1792), it was one of the main residences of the royal court and the place for a grand court life. From 1792 until 1813, it served as residence for the queen dowager of Gustav III, Sophia Magdalena of Denmark. After her death, the palace was uninhabited until 1821.

Relatively little survives of the 18th century interiors, since Ulriksdal served as a veterans' hospital from 1822 to 1849. The hospital was established by King Charles XIV John for veterans of the Russo-Swedish War of 1808–1809. The palace was therefore almost empty when it was acquired in 1856 by Prince Charles, later King Charles XV. During the reign of Charles XV (r. 1859–1872), the palace was used as his preferred summer residence. With the aid of architect Fredrik Wilhelm Scholander and through extensive purchases of antiques, Prince Charles was able to design and furnish the palace at his own taste. Many of these furnishings are still on display. During the reign of King Oscar II (1872–1907), it was often used by Queen Sophia as her personal summer residence: it also served as her residence as a widow until her death in 1913.

In 1923, Prince Gustav Adolf, the future King Gustaf VI Adolf married Louise Mountbatten. Ulriksdal became closely associated with the royal couple. During their time, the former knights' hall was turned into a living room with furniture designed by designer Carl Malmsten.

The palace has been open to the public since 1986. The original furnishings have been relocated to the preserved rooms and parts of the former living quarters are used to exhibit items from Gustaf VI Adolf's art and crafts collection as well as Gustaf V's silver collection.

== Outbuildings ==
The Palace Theatre Confidencen

The Palace Theatre, Confidencen, is situated in a building from the 1670s which was originally used as a horse riding house and later a guesthouse. In 1753, Queen Louisa Ulrika commissioned architect Carl Fredrik Adelcrantz to convert the building into a theatre. It was built in Rococo style, seats 200 spectators and has a table à confidence, a table which can be lowered through the floor to the basement to be set. Today Confidencen is the oldest Rococo theatre in Sweden, reopened in 1981 and run by Kjerstin Dellert.

Ulriksdal Palace had in the palace's northern wing originally a chapel, built in 1662 by architect Jean de la Vallée. The chapel was torn down during Gustav III's renovation of the palace in 1774. The present chapel was designed by architect Fredrik Wilhelm Scholander and was built in 1864–1865 in the palace garden, in Dutch new Renaissance style with a certain influences from Venice.

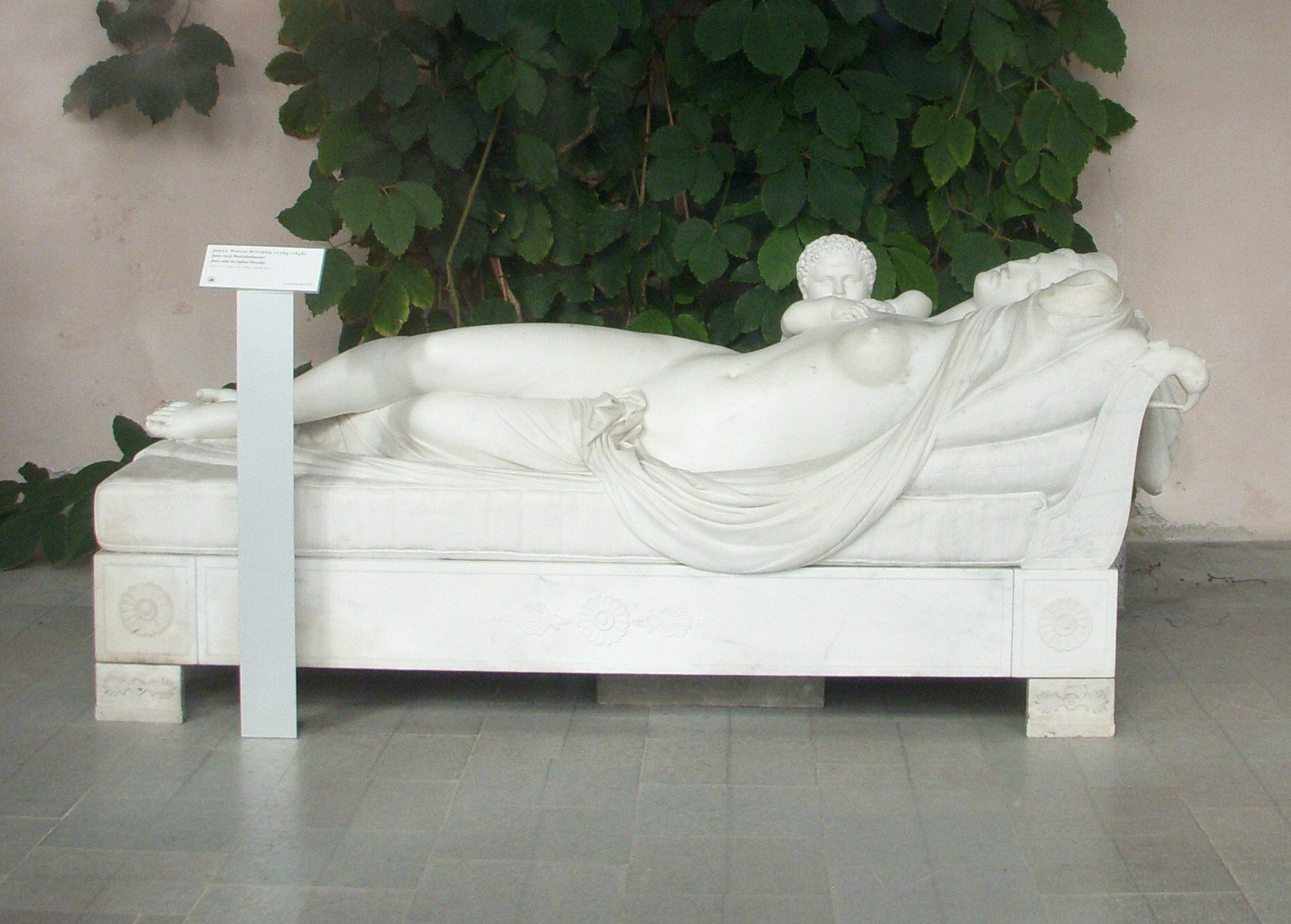
Juno suckling the infant Hercules, the Orangery, by Johan Niclas Byström

Next to the palace is the greenhouse, today the Orangery Museum. The Orangery was built at the end of the 17th century by architect Nicodemus Tessin the Younger. Despite a number of later changes, Tessin's architecture still dominates the Orangery, which houses parts of the National Museum's sculpture collection, including works by the sculptors Johan Tobias Sergel, Carl Milles and Johan Niclas Byström. In 2005 the Orangery inspired the design of the music pavilion at Stålboga.

== See also ==
- Morianbron
- Solna Church
