= Ruth Althén =

Swedish operatic soprano

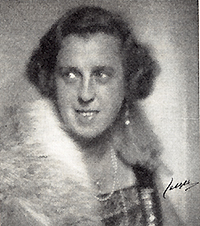
- Althén c. 1930
- Born: Ruth Ester Whitefield; September 11, 1890; Kristianstad
- Died: January 5, 1985 (aged 94)
- Occupation: Opera singer
- Years active: 1915 – after 1927
- Spouse: Ragnar Althén (m. 1918–1941)

Ruth Ester Althén née Whitefield (1890–1985) was a Swedish operatic soprano. Trained by Thekla Hofer and Ture Rangström, she made her début at the Royal Swedish Opera in 1915 with the title role in Aida. Engaged by the Royal Opera in 1918, she also performed in concerts.

== Biography ==
Born in Kristianstad on 11 September 1890, Ruth Ester Whitefield was the daughter of the businessman Nils Whitefield and his wife Ingrid née Hanson. She studied voice in Stockholm under Thekla Hofer, Ture Rangström and Haldis Ingebjart. She attended the Royal Dramatic Training Academy from 1914 to 1918. She continued training in Berlin under Ernst Grenzebach and in Milan under Vittorio Maria Vanzo and Giannina Russ. In 1918 she married the organist and composer Ragnar Althén. The marriage was dissolved in 1941.

She made her début as Aida in 1914 at the Royal Swedish Opera where she was engaged in 1918. Other successful roles included Elsa in Lohengrin, Elena in Mefistofele and Elisabet in Tannhäuser. She also played Desdemona in Otello, Rosina in The Marriage of Figaro and Emerentia in The Doomsday Prophets. In 1927, she performed in the Swedish première of Turandot. She also performed in concerts.

Ruth Althén died on 5 January 1985. She was buried in Östra Begravningsplatsen i Kristianstad.

== Discography ==
Ruth Althén is one of the singers on the His Master's Voice recording "Operan (Röster Från Stockholmsoperan Under 100 År" where she sings "Desdemonas Bön" from Verdi's Otello.
