= Cecilia Hjortsberg =

Swedish opera singer, born 1977 (born 1978)

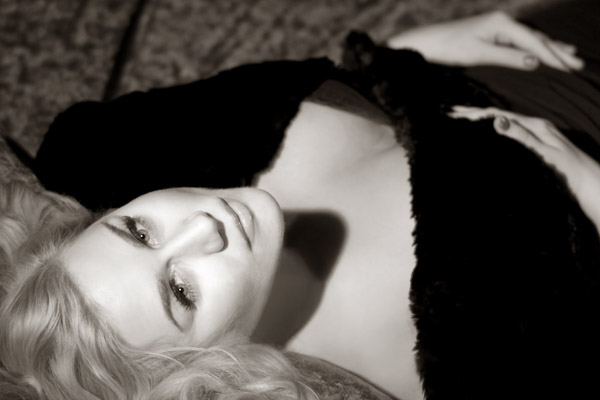
Cecilia Hjortsberg

Cecilia Hjortsberg is a Swedish opera singer (soprano), born 1977

She has been employed at The Royal Theatre, Copenhagen since 2005. Previous employment was at Malmö Opera and Music Theatre, where she has contributed in Miss Saigon, Otello, Turandot, La Bohème and Faust and played Donna Anna in Don Giovanni by Skånska Operan, 2005.

== Education ==
She attended the Royal College of Music of Stockholm, Chamber music program, and then the Opera Studio at the Gothenburg Opera.

== Opera Roles ==
- Starring role as the witch in Hans och Greta
- Isis in Naumanns Osiris, production by the Malmö lyrical ensemble
- Donna Anna in Mozarts Don Giovanni, production by the Opera of Skåne
- Georgetta in Puccinis Il tabarro, production by the Opera i Provinsen
- Desdemona in Verdis Othello, Production by the Opera i Provinsen, performed at Takkeloftet at The Royal Danish Opera
- Second Water nymph in Dvořák's Rusalka, production by the Royal Danish Opera
- Voice from above in Don Carlos, production by the Royal Danish Opera
- Cover for the role "Stövlet-katrine" in Bo Holten's Livläkarens Besök
- Fiordiligi in Così fan tutte
- Emperor Augustus in Tiberius prövningar

== Sources ==
- Ohlsson, Matilda, Operasångerska som gillar hårdrock, Blekinge Läns Tidning, 30 December 2009
- Söderbom, Emma, Cecilia från Karlskrona bor mitt i gängkriget, Sydöstran, 5 March 2009
