= Mathilda d'Orozco =

Italian composer (1796–1863)

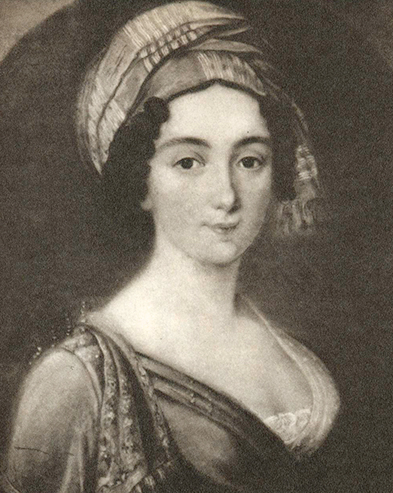
Portrait, c. 1820

Mathilda Valeria Beatrix d'Orozco (14 June 1796 – 19 October 1863), also by marriage known as Cenami, Montgomery-Cederhjelm and Gyllenhaal, was a Swedish (originally Spanish-Italian) noble and salonist, composer, poet, writer, singer, amateur actress and harpsichordist.

== Biography ==
D'Orozco was born in Italy to the Spanish ambassador in Milan, Count Nicolas Blasco d'Orozco and Sabina Lederer. She was first married to marquess Cenami, stable master of the court of the sister of Napoleon, Princess Elisa Bonaparte, while she was appointed lady-in-waiting to Elisa. She was widowed before she was twenty. In 1817 in Vienna, she married second to the Swedish Count colonel Josias Montgomery-Cederhjelm (d. 1825), with whom she had four children. In 1839, she married the Swedish Baron Carl Alexander Fredrik Gyllenhaal.

In connection with her second marriage (1817), d'Orozco moved to Sweden, where she was to live the rest of her life. In Sweden, she became a noted socialite in the capital, later called "one of the most noted ornaments in the salons of high society during the first happy and vibrant period of the reign of Charles XIV John (reign 1818–1844). Used to the warmer climate of Italy, she once remarked : "God was angry when he created the Swedish climate!" She was described as a warm person with great charm and talent within many fields of art, which she developed in her hectic social life.

As a member of the nobility, she was presented at the royal court, and took part in the court life of King Charles John and Queen Désirée, where she became a centre of the court's entertainment. She was an admired, versatile singer, who sometimes accompanied her singing by playing the harp; she also took part in the amateur theatre of the royal court, where she was described as an actress hors ligne, and was seen as a natural, fairylike dancer. The Crown Prince Oscar, as well as the British ambassador, John Bloomfield, 2nd Baron Bloomfield, were counted among her admirers.

After her third marriage (1839), she withdrew from society life and moved to her husband's estate out in the countryside, except for annual visits to the Norrtälje seaside resort. She died, aged 67, at Stora Ekeby, Rytterne, Sweden.

Gustaf Lagerbjelke dedicated to her the poem "L'une et l'autre".

== Works ==
=== Songs- and piano compositions ===
She wrote numerous texts for piano and singing:

- Axels monolog (text by Esaias Tegnér, dedicated to Charlotte Åkerhielm)
- Frithiofs lycka (text by Esaias Tegnér)
- Fogelleken (text av Esaias Tegnér) (Stockholm, 1829)
- Fyra sånger med accompagnement af Piano forte. (dedicated to Charlotte Åkerhielm, 1829)
  - 1. Stjernsången (Tegner)
  - 2. Wågen (Karl August Nicander)
  - 3. Drömmen till Laura (Beskow)
  - 4. Jag vill ej drömma mer (Beskow)
- Sånger med accompagnement för Pianoforte ['Songs with notes for pianoforte'] (dedicated to Carlotte von Kraemer, 1833)
  - Jag gick med lyran i min hand (Carl Wilhelm Böttiger)
  - "Dit bort"
  - Vår
  - Afskeds önskan
  - Kärlek eller vänskap (Thomas Moore)
- Sånger med accompagnement för Pianoforte (dedicated to Fredrika Bremer, 1834)
  - Säg hvar finns ett enda troget hjerta
  - Echo i Ådalen
  - Gå ej bort.
- Fyra sångstycken för piano-forte (1839)
  - Galer slafven (C. C. G.)
  - Romanza
  - Hambo polska
  - Hoppet
- Sånger vid pianoforte (dedicated to her daughter Eugenie)
  - Negerflickans klagan
  - Nordens kämpe
  - Den blinda sångarn
  - Duo, or Hoppet än med klara strålar
  - Fyren.
- Sex sånger vid Piano-Forte (dedicated to Marie von Stedingk, 1842)
  - Frågan (X.)
  - Indiansk waggvisa (H. H.)
  - Du är borta (M. M.)
  - Den öfvergifna (R. Hjärne)
  - Galloppen
  - Han kommer ej (L. Bn o.)
- Sveriges främsta Ädling. (text Carl Wilhelm Böttiger, dedicated to Magnus Brahe (1790–1844), 1845)
- Barcarolle (1861)
- Sånger vid Fortepiano (dedicated to Prince Gustaf, Duke of Uppland)
  - Lilla Fogeln
  - Illusionen
  - Den vissnade Blomman
  - Min Philosophi
  - Wikings-sången (Herman Sätherberg)
  - Dryckes-Wisa
  - Afsked från Hemmet (Herman Sätherberg)
- Fyra sånger vid piano (dedicated to Oscar II)
  - Främlingens syn (Johan Ludvig Runeberg)
  - "Italia" (Carl Wilhelm Böttiger)
  - Höstqvällen
  - Wikinga-sången (G.H.S.)
- Fyra sånger vid piano-forte (1839)
  - Romance (Je vous l'ai dit, je vous adore)
  - Strödda tankar (Karl August Nicander)
  - I recitativ manér (Era l'ora che volge il desiro) (text from Inferno (Dante))
  - Strömmen (Johan Gabriel Carlén)
- Sju sånger vid piano (1856)
  - Jag följer dig
  - Champagne-ruset (Wilhelm von Braun)
  - Om hundra år (S_dt)
  - "Qvinnoögat" (Wilhelm von Braun)
  - "Till min Dotter!"
  - "Lycklig du!" (L_a)
  - Någonstädes gumman Lenngren säger (E. S_dt)
- Vid Julbrasan för några år sedan (P. K. L., 1854)
- Povera Italia mia!.
- Den bedragna.
- La Serenata Contadinesca con risporta dalla Finestra
- Rings Drapa.

=== Piano music ===
- Hussar-Marsch, Norstedt & söner, Stockholm, 1854.
- Svenska arméns Revelje och Tapto (1865)

=== Poems ===
- Dikter (1870)
