= Adolf Fredrik's Music School =

Municipal junior high school in Sweden

Coordinates: 59°20′19″N 18°2′57″E

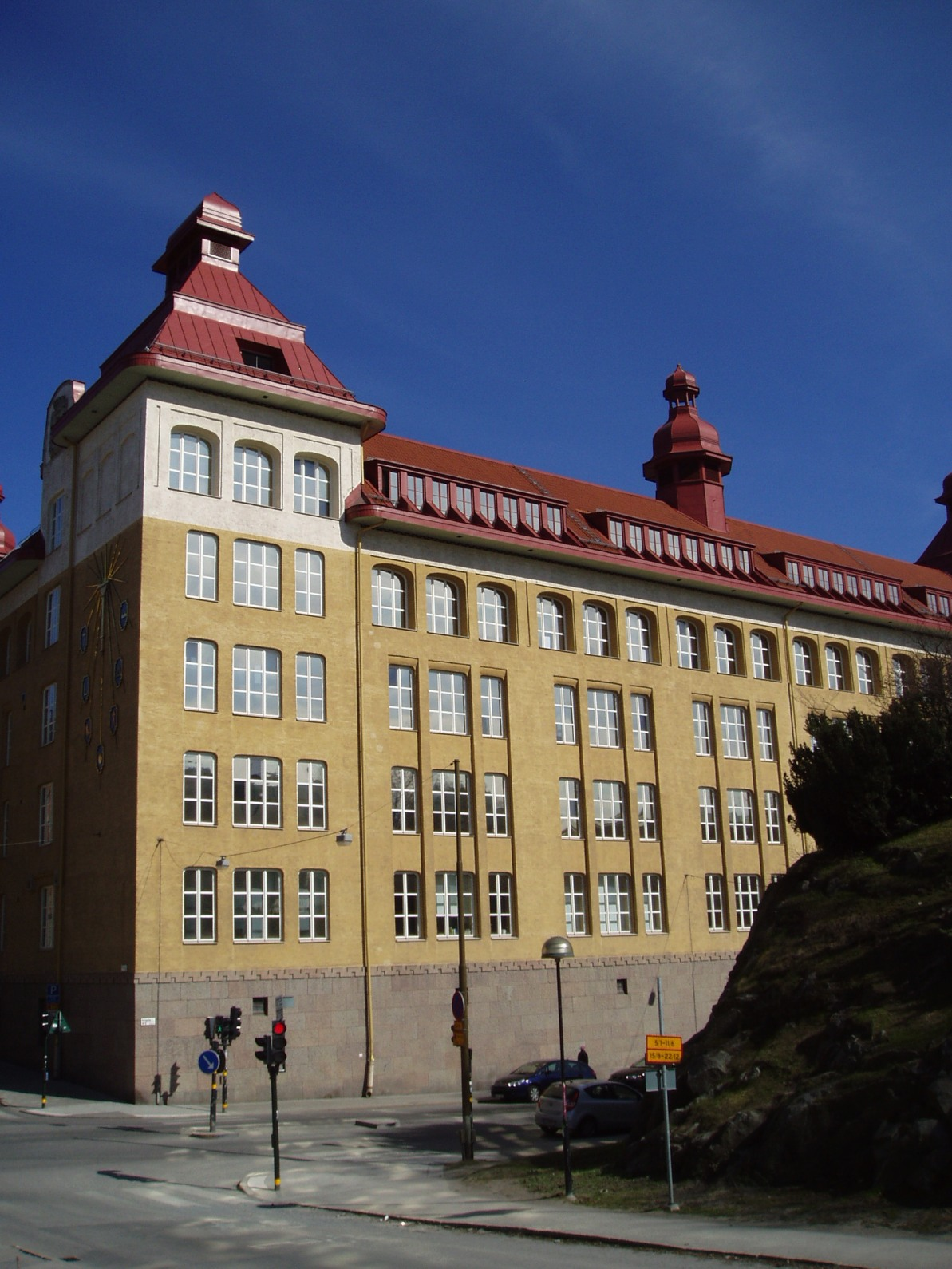
- Main building of City campus (built 1907–10)

Information
- Type: Municipal junior high school (Swedish: grundskola)
- Established: 1939
- Principal: Anna Alvring (City campus)
- Principal: Berith Öhrn (Farsta campus)
- Gender: Mixed
- Age: 9 to 16
- Enrollment: Approximately 1,100 (City campus) and 300 in music classes (Farsta campus)
- Campus: Urban
- Newspaper: Lyran
- Tuition: Free
- Website: adolffredriksmusikklasser.stockholm (City campus) farstagrundskola.stockholm (Farsta campus) (Both mostly in Swedish)

Adolf Fredrik's Music School (Swedish: Adolf Fredriks musikklasser) is a specialized municipal junior high school (Swedish: grundskola) in Stockholm, Sweden focused on choral music. Highly competitive admission auditions test singing and musical ability. The school has two campuses and three youth choirs of high international standard. Many professional musicians are alumni.

Adolf Fredrik's Youth Choir is part of the Adolf Fredrik Church and has only its name in common with the school. Adolf Fredriks Madrigalkör used to be associated with the church, but is now independent from both the church and the school.

== History ==
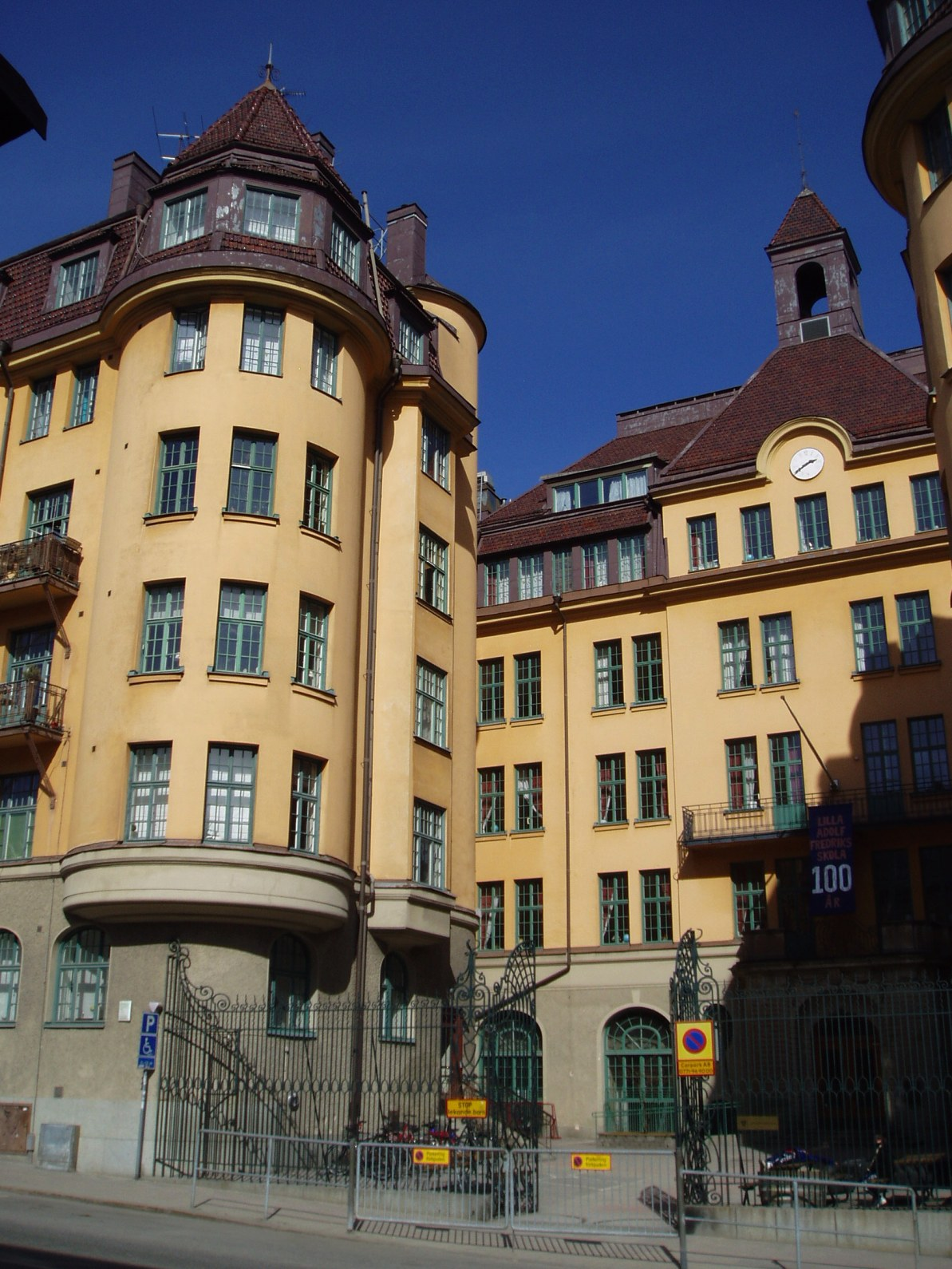
Lilla (small) Adolf Fredrik's School

=== Founding ===
The school was founded in 1939 on the initiative of Hugo Hammarström (1891–1974) and offered the first music classes in Sweden, based on models such as King's College, Cambridge England, Die Städtische Singschule, (Note: Later renamed Sing- und Musikschule Mozartstadt Augsburg) Augsburg, Germany, and the Copenhagen Boys Choir in Denmark. The purpose was to give musically inclined pupils additional training in singing, sight-reading, choral singing and more. Hammarström continued his work at the music school until 1957.

=== The AF fight ===
In 1982–83, the school was the focus of a heated controversy, AF-striden (literally The AF fight), between those who felt that special classes of any kind and Adolf Fredrik's Music School in particular represent an "elitist" approach, and those who felt that all students have a right to develop their abilities as far as possible. One factor that inflamed the battle was a study of similar music classes in Norrköping, where it could be shown that the pupils' parents mostly, but not exclusively, had high status occupations. The Swedish Nobel Prize laureate, sociologist and politician Alva Myrdal took a strong stance on the issue in an interview in Svenska Dagbladet by Mats Johansson on 14 July 1983. On 17 September 1983, she published a letter in the Swedish daily Dagens Nyheter where she explained that the goal of the Swedish school system, equal schooling to all, means that all pupils should be encouraged to develop their abilities. She also warned against repression of special abilities under the guise of elitism. This effectively ended the controversy.

=== Name and location ===
The name of the school has changed several times and the premises have also changed. Stockholms musikklasser (Stockholm's music classes) is still used to describe the same school, and before 1960 the school was called Stockholm's singing classes. Adolf Fredrik is the name of the Swedish King who lived 1710–1771. The school has mostly been housed in the present city campus location, but periodically there have also been branch operations in Mariaskolan, Eriksdalsskolan, Vasa Real and finally the Swedish National Defence College's old premises at Valhallavägen.

=== Second campus ===
On 13 December 2013, it was announced by the municipal school authorities in Stockholm that because of the extreme popularity and low admissions rate of the existing Adolf Fredrik's Music School a second Music School campus with the same orientation would open in 2015. The new campus opened in the fall of 2015.

== Buildings ==
=== City campus ===
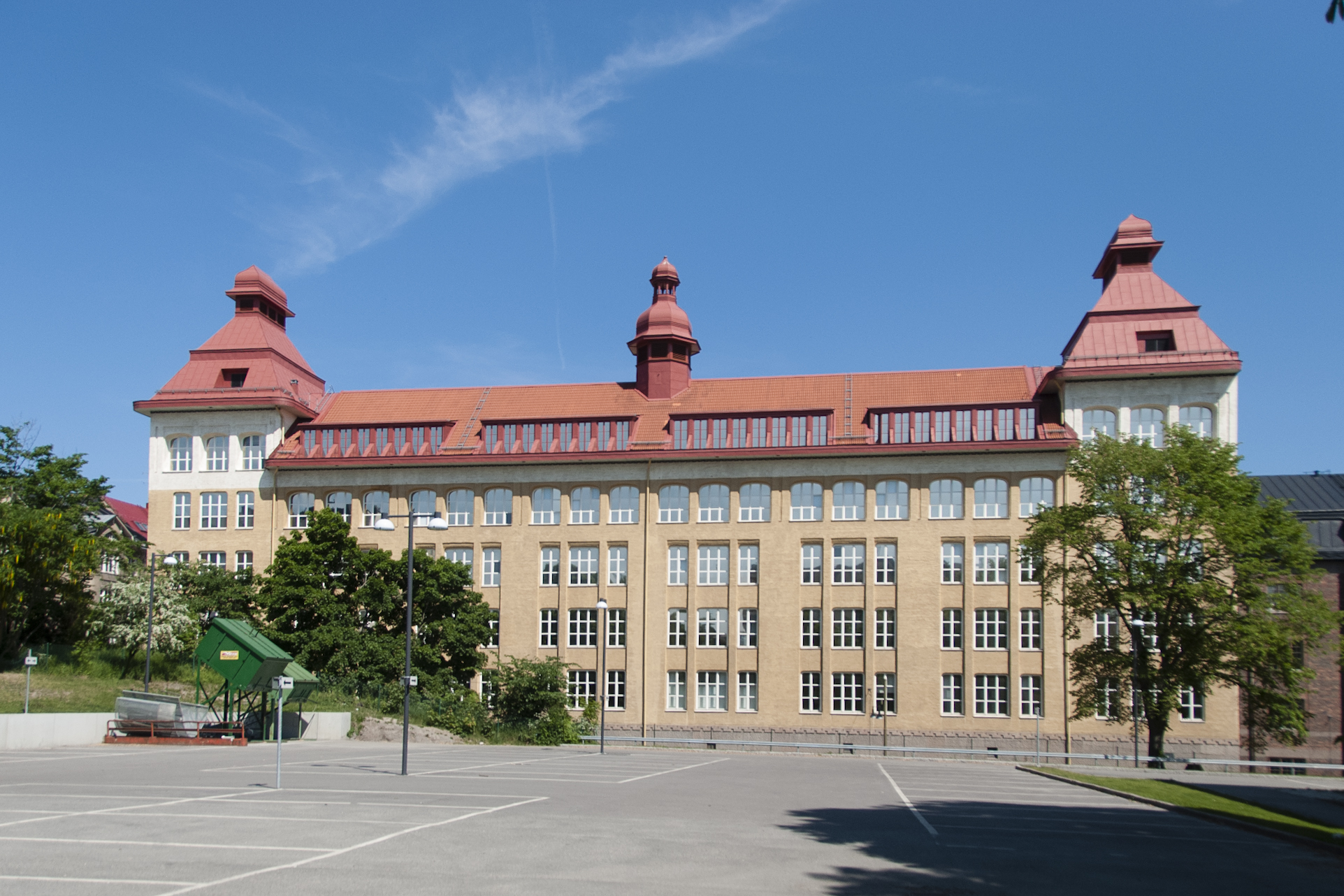
City campus

On the site of the present buildings, roughly at the intersection Dalagatan/Rådmansgatan, a windmill called Nya Rörstrandskvarnen and nicknamed Stora Tisan was constructed sometime between 1747 and 1751. The windmill was in use until the 1880s when it was moved elsewhere.

The main building of the City campus with street address Tegnérgatan 44–46 in Stockholm has housed various school forms over the years. From 1939 Stockholm's music classes has concentrated the major part of its activities to the building that is presently named Adolf Fredrik's Music School, a name that may thus refer both to the institution with two campuses and to the City campus building. The main building was erected in 1907–10 as a folkskola (people's school), originally for a capacity of 2,360 pupils, based on drawings by architect Georg A. Nilsson. The main building (see the first photo) is the base of Stockholms musikklasser (Stockholm's music classes) that was previously housed in other buildings, and the two names are used without distinction in daily conversation.

There is also a smaller building (see the second photo) on the same site, built 1907–10, architect Hagström & Ekman. This building formerly housed Åhlinska skolan and is now used for younger children without a specific music curriculum.

=== Farsta campus ===
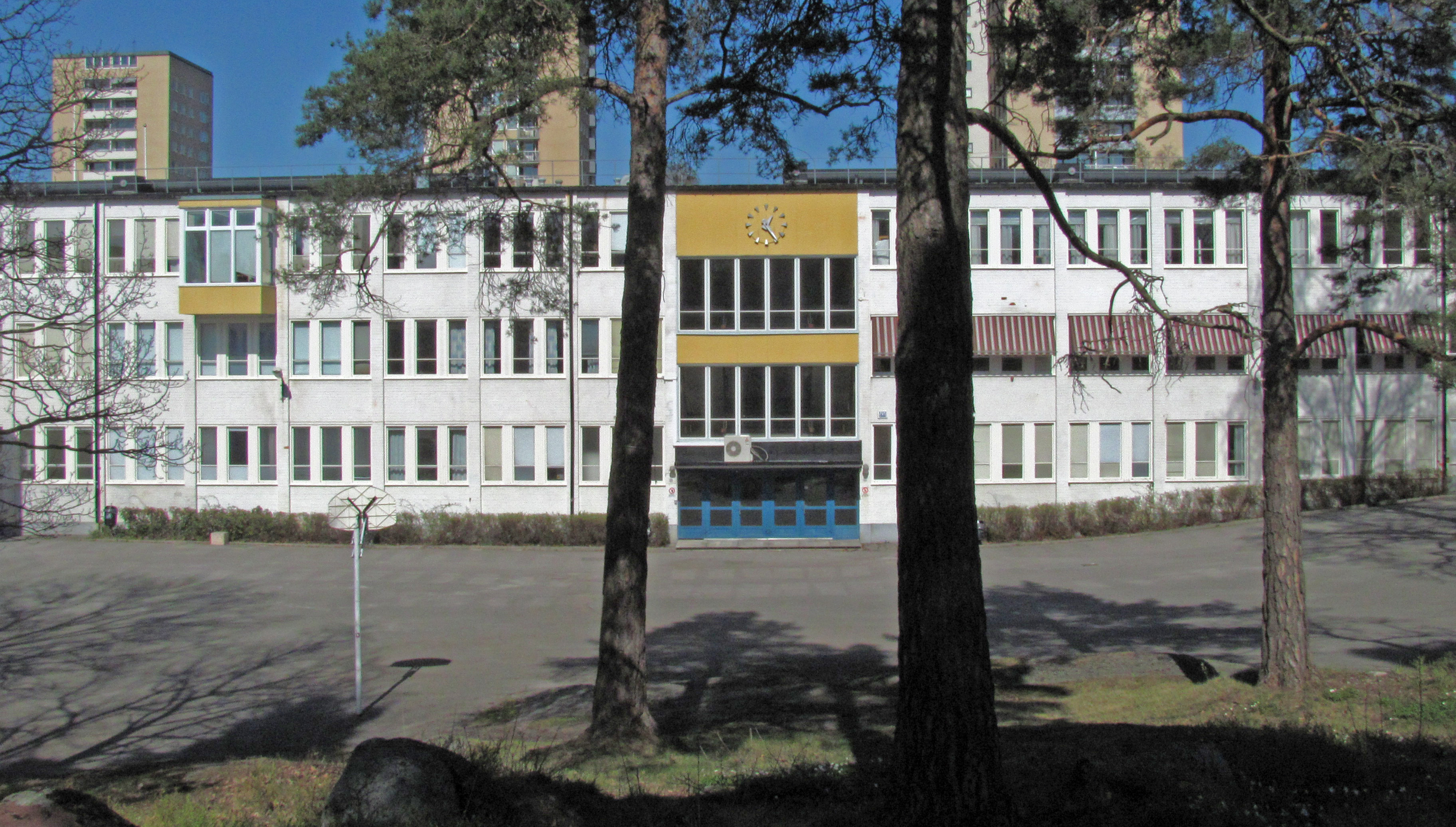
Southwest facade of Farsta campus

The Farsta campus with street address Farstavägen 118 in Farsta, a district of Farsta borough south of Stockholm, has had different names over the years. The white building, designed by architect Lennart Brundin, was finished in 1963 and was originally named Farsta läroverk (English: Farsta grammar school). The name was changed to Farsta gymnasium (English: Farsta high school) in 1967. From 2015 the name is Farsta grundskola (English: Farsta primary school).

The buildings will be renovated at a cost of about SEK 150 million, with work to be finished in the fall of 2017. The main lecture hall will also function as a concert hall with 500 seats. In contrast with the City campus the Farsta campus will have music classes mixed with normal classes in grades 0-9. When at full capacity in 2019 the campus will house a total of 1,160 students whereof 360 in music classes.

== Academics ==
Adolf Fredrik's Music School is a niche school, with heavy emphasis on music and choral singing, but without sacrificing academic rigor in other subjects. Admission to the school is based on audition in singing and musical ability before starting fourth grade, and admission is competitive with an acceptance rate of around 15%. 240 students are admitted annually, 180 for the City campus and 60 and for the Farsta campus, and attend the school from 4th to 9th grade. Two-thirds of the admitted students are girls. Over 1,000 students attend the City campus and when fully established the Farsta campus will have over 350 students. For the academic year 2013–2014 the school ranked number seven in Sweden for junior high school grade point average.

The twice-annual school newspaper Lyran was started in 1963, making it the oldest school newspaper in Sweden, according to the Swedish Patent and Registration Office.

== Music ==
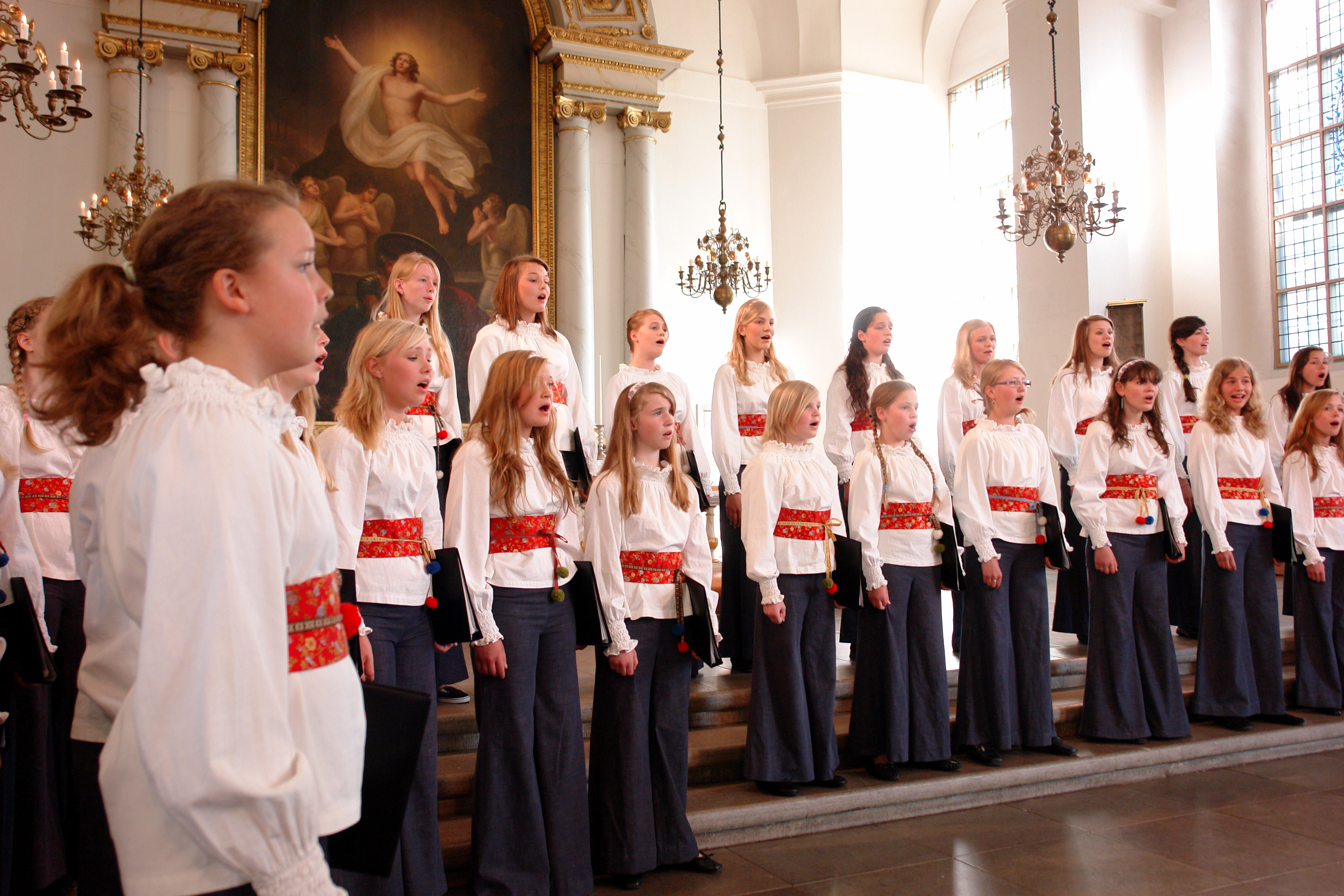
Adolf Fredrik's Girls Choir

Each student belongs to a class-choir consisting of 30 to 60 students. Practices are held almost every school day, and each class-choir has a substantial concert program schedule (at churches and auditoriums and other venues). Additionally, the school has three official choirs, which represent the school in concerts and competitions: Adolf Fredrik's Girls Choir, Boys Choir, and the mixed Chamber Choir. Membership in the official 3 choirs is based on auditions, held amongst the school's students.

Students at the school will have sung in class choirs (often a cappella) for 1200 hours by the time they graduate at age 16. (Those who participate in one of the school's competitive representation choirs and continue to a high school which also has emphasis in music, may accumulate 2000 hours of singing before university.) This training takes place during the students' most formative years.

After graduating from the school, some students continue on to one of three high schools in Stockholm with heavy emphasis on music: Kungsholmens Musikgymnasium with mixed academic/choral singing emphasis, Södra Latin with mixed academic/individual musicianship emphasis, or Lilla Akademien with a heavy emphasis on fostering future professional musicians.

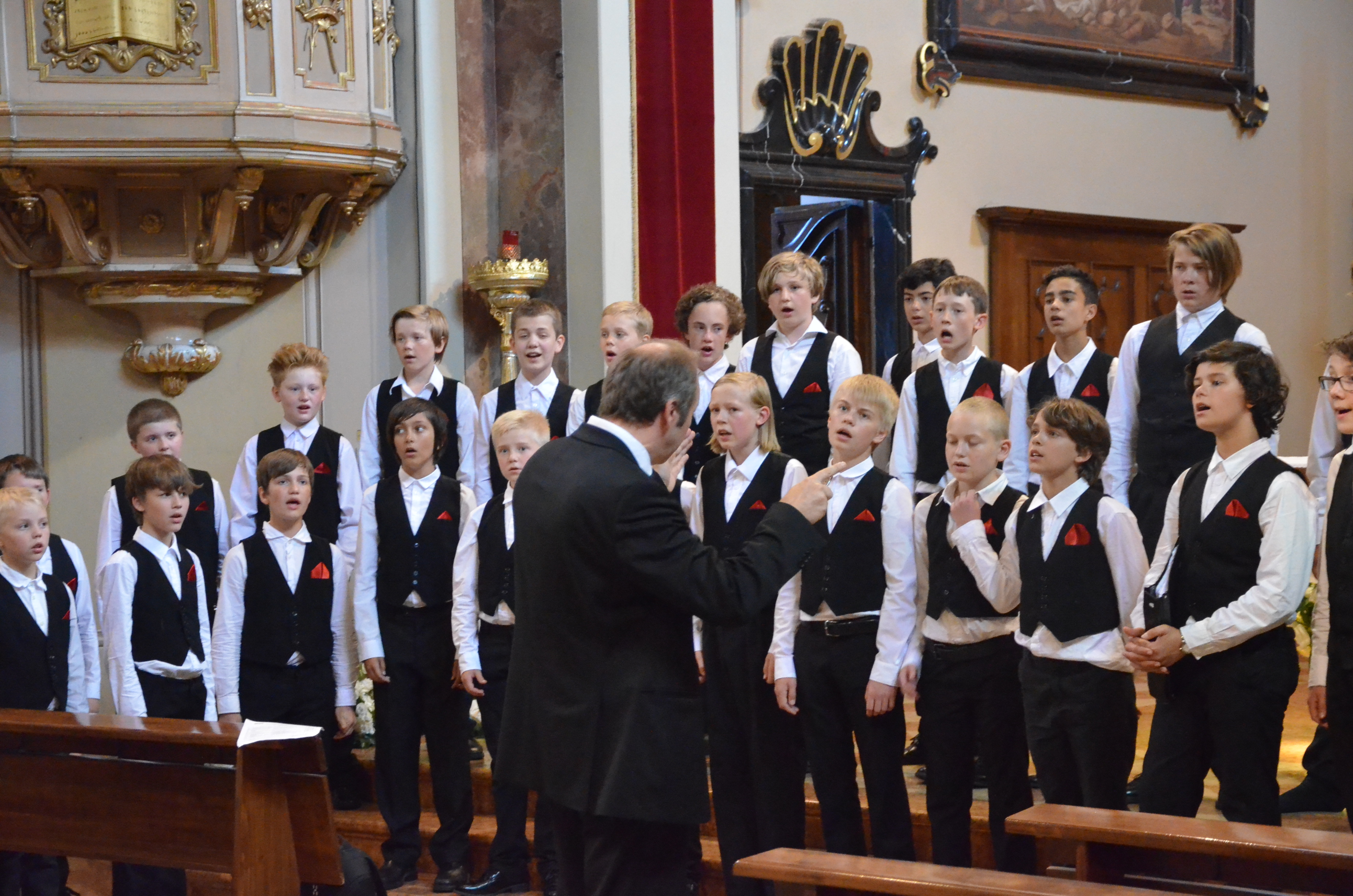
Adolf Fredrik's Boys Choir

=== Cooperation ===
In 1959 Stockholms Musikgymnasium (Stockholm's Music High School) for 10th through 12th grade started its activity in Adolf Fredrik's Music School. In 1984 it moved to Kungsholmens gymnasium. Collaboration between the two schools continues and is manifested in annual concerts in the Globen arena, Strawberry Arena or other suitable venues with high spectator capacity.

Students from Adolf Fredrik's Music School regularly participate in opera performances at the Royal Swedish Opera, such as when children's voices are required in operas like Bizet's Carmen. Grammophone recordings featuring Adolf Fredrik's Music School choirs have been nominated for the Grammis Award (the Swedish equivalent to the Grammy Award) in 1990, 2009 and 2013. The web pages of Adolf Fredrik's Girls and Adolf Fredrik's Boys Choir list 16 and 4 cd disc recordings respectively.

=== Choral Festivals – Let the Future Sing ===
In 2009 the Music School celebrated its 70th anniversary by hosting a children and youth choral festival, Adolf Fredrik Choral Festival, with participating choirs from several countries. The festival, also known as Let the Future Sing, was held again in 2012 with around 300 singers from Armenia, Estonia, Canada, China, USA and South Africa as well as around 1,000 Swedish singers. (Note: "Let The future Sing". Adolf Fredriks musikklasser. Archived from the original on 2014-10-14. 2012 festival.) The third festival was held in 2015 with a total of 1,400 young choral singers, including choirs from Bulgaria, Finland, the Philippines, Russia, the Czech Republic and the Netherlands. (Note: "Let the Future Sing 2015". Adolf Fredriks musikklasser. 20 May 2015. Archived from the original on 2015-06-15. 2015 festival.)

== Parental involvement ==
Parents are very important for the school's continued success. First, there is for all practical purposes mandatory parent participation in class based working groups for concerts, class excursions and other tasks. Parents of each class are assigned to one of six groups for one year at a time, so that by the time the student finishes his or her studies each parent has participated in each of the six working groups.

Second, the Parent Teacher Organization (AFFF – Adolf Fredriks Föräldraförening) is very active in different ways to promote the school and enhance its academic and musical curriculum. During the AF fight referred to above AFFF played a very important lobbying role (see external links).

Third, Föreningen Adolf Fredriks Musikklasser (English: the Adolf Fredrik's Music School Association) works to promote child and youth choirs locally, nationally and internationally (see external links).

== Student government ==
The student body is represented by the Adolf Fredrik's Music School Student council (Swedish: elevråd), that serves the student body by promoting extracurricular activities and by providing a voice to the student body in all discussion of school policy with the administration. The Student council applies voluntary membership, is student-driven, democratic, and has equal voting rights for all members. It consists of Class councils, Team councils and a Council board.

The Team councils are each headed by a President aided by a Secretary, elected at the first meeting of the new school year. When Team councils meet every other Tuesday a teacher from the team also participates. Every President of a Team council is also a member of the Council Board, that elects a Chairman and a Secretary. The Council Board meets every week in the Principal's office.

== Reputation ==
A choir from the school won the BBC's "Let the people sing" choir competition and in 2001, and became a Choir of the European Federation and Cultural Ambassador". The school is mentioned as one of the building blocks of The Swedish Choral Miracle. Singers.com called the school "a distinguished institution of music well known throughout the world" and the Barbershop Harmony Society called it "the most renowned choir school in Sweden". Discogs said the school is "one of the most internationally recognized children's and youth choirs throughout the world."

== Wider influence ==
=== The Swedish Choral Miracle ===
The school was the first Music School of its kind in Sweden and has inspired scores of similar schools around the country, forming one of the building blocks of The Swedish Choral Miracle (the term is a well-known expression in the world of choral music, ever since the book with the same name by Richard Sparks was published). Though Adolf Fredrik's Music School was the first of its kind, its success had by 2008 led to the creation of classes with a focus on choral singing or instrumental music in addition to the normal academic curriculum in 70 schools around Sweden. At least 5% of the Swedish population are members of and sing in choirs weekly. In 1999 Per-Åke Byström and Bo Johansson published the Swedish language book Tidernas körklang : en bok om Adolf Fredriks musikklasser, Stockholms musikgymnasium och mycket annat about the choral sound and tradition of Adolf Fredrik's Music School and Stockholms Musikgymnasium.

=== Barbershop ===
Barbershop is a special case. There were as of 2013 only 8 male choruses, some 20 quartets and in total approximately 250 individuals throughout the Nordic countries combined who sing barbershop in a reasonably organized manner (i.e., belonging to a barbershop organization). The barbershop quartet Ringmasters became the first ever non-US International Champions in 2012, while Swedish barbershop quartets have become International Collegiate Quartet Champions in 2008, 2010 and 2012. The members of these championship winning groups have their musical roots in Adolf Fredrik's Music School and Kungsholmens Musikgymnasium.

In 1989 Growing Girls from Stockholm suburb Rönninge was the first non-US female quartet to become Sweet Adelines International champions (called "Queens of Harmony"); all the quartet members attended Adolf Fredrik's Music School.

== Headmasters ==
City campus

- 1963–1980 Stig Gunnarskog
- 1980–1984 Ove Wergens
- 1984–1988 Stig Rosén
- 1989–1996 Britt Wennerfors
- 1996–2002 Hans-Erik Rudin
- 2003–2004 Christina Thunberg
- 2004–2019 Lars-Göran Jacobsson
- 2019–present Anna Alvring

Farsta campus

- 2015–2016 Wolfgang Johansson
- 2016–2016 Petter Carlsson (acting)
- 2016–2024 Cathrine Sahlsten
- 2024–present Berith Öhrn

== Discography ==
The school choirs have made a number of recordings that are listed in the appropriate Wikipedia articles. Recordings that are attributed to the school as a whole include:

- Barn Från Adolf Fredriks Musikskola, Ivan Renlidens Orkester – De Mest Älskade Barnvisorna Av Alice Tegnér (Cass, Album). 1970. Odeon, EMI 4E 254-34154, EMI 711
- Sjung Av Hela Hjärtat (CD, Album). 1996. Hjärtebarnsföreningen 1996-1
- Sånger Ur Majas Alfabet (CD, Album). 2008. Naxos 8.570732

== Alumni ==
Alphabetically and grouped by primary professional role. Only alumni with separate English language Wikipedia articles are included. Many alumni continue to sing choral music, or otherwise stay involved in musical endeavours, non-professionally.

=== Popular singers ===
- Salem Al Fakir (soul, pop, jazz)
- Sonja Aldén (pop, songwriter)
- Kristin Amparo (pop)
- Mattias Andréasson (pop)
- Love Antell (pop-rock)
- Gunilla Backman (singer, actress and musical-artist)
- Margareta Bengtson (jazz, harpist, former member of The Real Group)
- Ann-Christine Bärnsten (singer, writer)
- Sarah Dawn Finer (singer, songwriter and actress)
- Marianne Flynner (country, folk rock)
- Jessica Folcker (pop, soul)
- Carola Häggkvist (singer, songwriter)
- Anna Jalkéus (Singer, harpist, composer, educator)
- Peter Jöback (singer, actor and musical artist)
- Sofia Karlsson (singer, folk music)
- Annika Ljungberg (techno/folk/bluegrass)
- Amit Paul (singer, former member of the Swedish pop band A*Teens)
- Linda Pritchard (singer, dancer, choreographer)
- Emilia Mitiku / Emilia Rydberg (pop, soul)
- Frida Sandén (pop)
- Mimmi Sandén (pop)
- Molly Sandén (singer, host, voice actress)
- Awa Santesson-Sey (pop)
- Danny Saucedo (pop, europop, dance)
- Erik Segerstedt (pop)
- Stephen Simmonds (singer, pop, soul)
- Niklas Strömstedt (pop)
- Blossom Tainton Lindquist (singer, dancer, publisher, fitness coach and personal trainer)
- Antonia Vai (singer, songwriter)
- Pernilla Wahlgren (pop, musical theatre)
- Christian Walz (singer, songwriter, producer)

=== Classical singers ===
- Kerstin Avemo (coloratura soprano opera singer)
- Tove Dahlberg (mezzo opera singer)
- Katija Dragojevic (mezzo opera singer)
- Joa Helgesson (baritone opera singer)
- Jan Kyhle (tenor, opera and musical singer)
- Anna Larsson (contralto opera singer)
- Nina Stemme (dramatic soprano opera singer)
- Erika Sunnegårdh (lyric soprano opera singer)
- Ingrid Tobiasson (mezzo opera singer)
- Johanna Wallroth (soprano opera singer)
- Michael Weinius (tenor opera singer)

=== Actors, actresses ===
- Björn Andrésen (actor, musician)
- Filip Berg (actor)
- Brasse Brännström (actor)
- Lina Englund (actress, musician)
- Rebecca Ferguson (actress)
- Wallis Grahn (actress)
- Kåre Hedebrant (actor)
- Elin Klinga (actress)
- Cecilia Nilsson (actress)
- Rebecca Scheja (actress, DJ, singer, songwriter and record producer)
- Ted Åström (actor)

=== Instrumentalists ===
- Nassim Al Fakir (musician, presenter, comedian, master of ceremonies, moderator and lecturer)
- Erik Arvinder (violinist, multi-instrumentalist, arranger, orchestrator and conductor)
- Monica Dominique (pianist, composer, actress)
- Anders Paulsson (soprano saxophonist)
- Roland Pöntinen (pianist, composer)
- Georg Riedel (double bass player, composer)
- Georg (Jojje) Wadenius (guitarist, bassist, singer, composer)
- Robert Wells (pianist, composer, singer)

=== Conductors, composers, producers ===
- Tina Ahlin (composer, pianist and singer)
- Arnthor Birgisson (producer)
- Carl Falk (songwriter, record producer and musician)
- Ingela Pling Forsman (lyricist)
- Lasse Hallström (film director)
- Patrik Ringborg (conductor)
- Stefan Solyom (conductor)
- Carl Unander-Scharin (composer, tenor opera singer)

=== Vocal ensembles ===
- The Real Group (a cappella group)
- Riltons Vänner (a cappella group)
- Ringmasters (barbershop quartet; International Champions 2012)

=== Other ===
- Lars-Gunnar Björklund (journalist)
- Katarina Hultling (journalist)
- Claude Marcus (pediatrician)
- Måns Möller (comedian, television presenter)
- Peter Schantz (exercise physiology scientist)
- Hanna Stjärne (journalist, former CEO for Radio Sweden, presently CEO for the Nobel Foundation)
- Martin Österdahl (television producer and writer)

== See also ==
- Education in Sweden
- Music Education
