= Carl David af Wirsén =

Swedish poet and literary critic

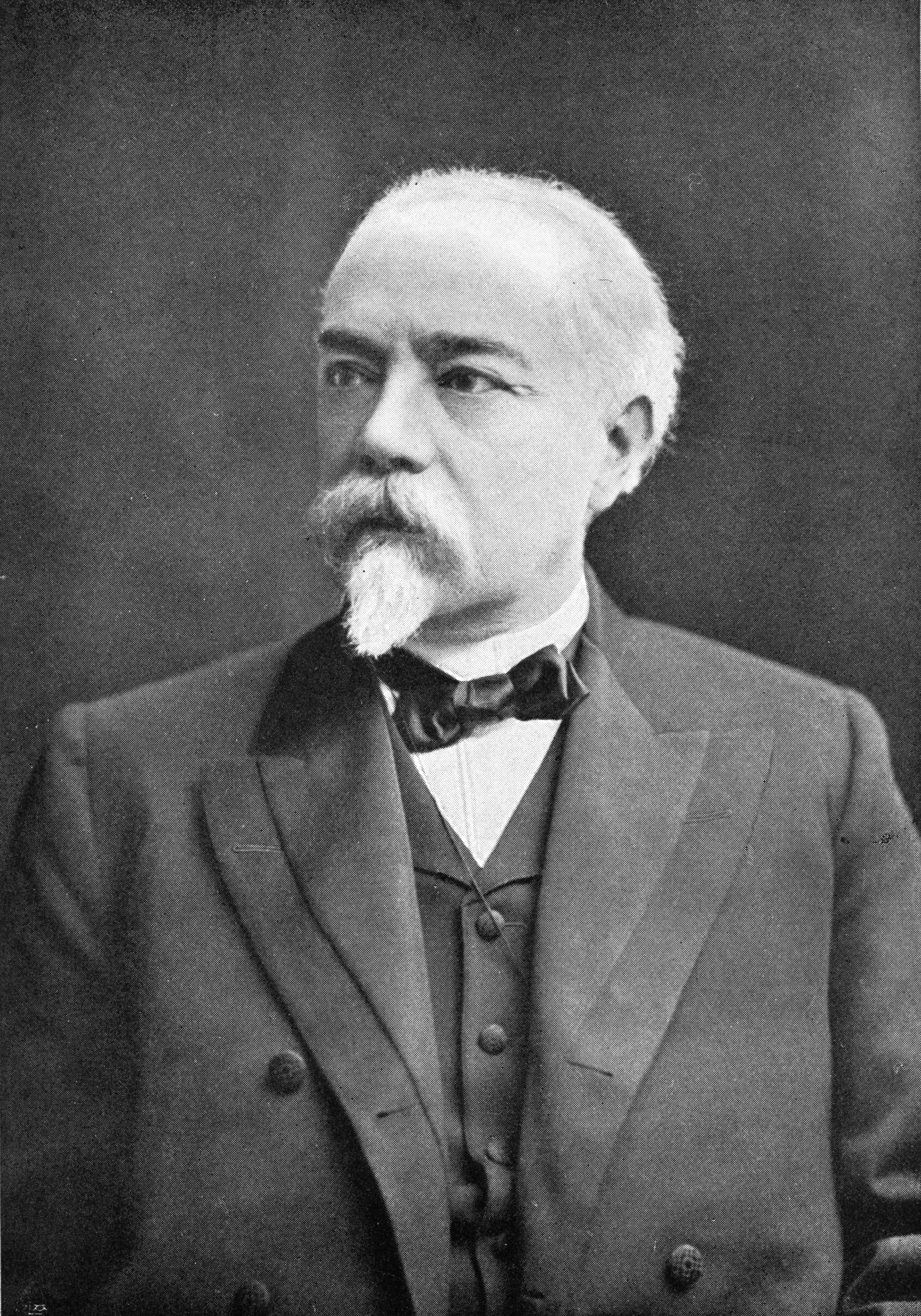
- Born: 9 December 1842; Vallentuna, Sweden
- Died: 12 June 1912 (aged 69); Stockholm, Sweden
- Occupations: poet and literary critic
- Spouse: Cecilia Emerentia Leontina Adlöf (1839–1912)
- Children: Einar af Wirsén
- Parent(s): Karl Ture af Wirsén; Eleonore von Schulzenheim

Member of the Swedish Academy (Seat No. 8)
- In office 20 December 1879 – 12 June 1912
- Preceded by: Carl Wilhelm Böttiger
- Succeeded by: Verner von Heidenstam

Permanent Secretary of the Swedish Academy
- In office November 1884 – June 1912
- Preceded by: Bror Emil Hildebrand
- Succeeded by: Hans Hildebrand

Carl David af Wirsén (9 December 1842 – 12 June 1912) was a Swedish poet, literary critic and the Swedish Academy's permanent secretary 1884–1912.

== Career ==
Wirsén was born in Vallentuna, Uppland, to Karl Ture af Wirsén and Eleonore von Schulzenheim.

He was also for several years, in company with the historian Hans Forssell, editor of the Swedish Literary Review.

In 1870, he became a lecturer in Swedish and Latin at Katedralskolan in Uppsala. In 1876 he moved to Gothenburg, where he lectured and took care of the museum's library and art collections.

In 1879 he succeeded Carl Wilhelm Böttiger to the seat 8 of the Swedish Academy, and moved the year after to Stockholm, where he became literary reviewer for the Post- och Inrikes Tidningar, and in 1886 also for the magazine Vårt Land.

In November 1884 he was appointed permanent secretary of the Swedish Academy. One of his tasks was to direct the work with "fixation of spelling" and the academy's dictionary. The former work resulted in Svenska Akademiens ordlista (The Swedish Academy's dictionary), where the modern spelling was represented, in spite of af Wirséns's opposition. Together with Theodor Wisén and Esaias Tegnér Jr., he tried to obstruct the publication.

In December 1883, he was appointed member of The Hymn Book committee of the Church of Sweden, which had the task of "preparing, with discretion, a new proposal for hymnbook". The result was the edition of 1889. He was appointed member of the Royal Swedish Academy of Sciences in 1905.

== Poetry ==
Wirsén made his debut as a poet under the signature Kuno, first in the student's calendar Isblomman (1861) and in Namnlösa sällskapet's first publication Sånger och berättelser af nio signaturer ("Songs and tales by nine signatures", 1863). After that, it lasted until the mourning memorial in Uppsala in 1872 after the death of king Charles XV of Sweden, for whom he wrote Sång till minne af konung Carl XV ("Song commemorating king Charles XV"). After several romantic poems in the monthly Nu, he published his first collection Dikter (poems) in 1876. It was followed by other collections of poetry. His Christian faith was expressed in several ways in his works, including hymns and spiritual poems, of which probably the best known is the summer hymn En vänlig grönskas rika dräkt.

== Criticism ==
af Wirsen's conservative views and an abundant publication of his literary criticism made him well-known but also provoked opposition, sometimes in harsh words, by his opponents, who represented new ideas with spelling reform and a freer style. According to his view, "the task of poetry is to discover the absolute, supersensual content, which is the foundation of the phenomena of the material world. The calling of the poet is a priesthood of light, he should in poetry reveal a higher world of purity and peace..."

As a critic, Wirsén found a hearing among many educated men, but not much connection with the young literature, and he has become notorious for his many negative reviews of August Strindberg, Verner von Heidenstam, Selma Lagerlöf, Henrik Ibsen and many others. His central position as permanent secretary of the Swedish Academy - the institution which started to award the Nobel prize of literature in 1901 - also gave him considerable influence on the choice of laureate in the first years; for instance, he was long able to exclude Selma Lagerlöf from the award, by year after year persuading a majority of the academy members to vote for alternative candidates, often nominated by himself.

== Selected works ==
=== Poetry ===
- Dikter (Poems), first collection (1876)
- Nya dikter (New poems), second collection (1880)
- Sånger och bilder (Songs and images) (1884)
- Vintergrönt (Winter green) (1890)
- Toner och sägner (1893)
- Under furor och cypresser (1896), med dikter som Spinoza, Septemberdag vid Bellmans byst
- Visor, romanser och ballader (1899)

=== Historical literature biographies ===
- Inträdestal i Svenska akademien över (sin företrädare) C.W. Böttiger (1880)
- Minne av riksmarskalken greve Johan Gabriel Oxenstierna (1885)
- Minne av biskopen doktor Frans Michael Franzén (1886)
- Minne av skalden Karl August Nicander (1886)
- Minne av friherre Bernhard von Beskow (1897)
- Minnesruna över professor A.J. Ångström (1875)

=== Hymns ===
- En vänlig grönskas rika dräkt (1986) written in 1889
- Det går ett tyst och tåligt lamm (1921)
- Det är så tyst, han kämpat ut (Sånger och psalmer 1951) written in 1889.
- Herren är tillstädes (Kyrklig sång 1928 nr 25 b.)
- I livets bok, o Fader, skriv (1921)
- Jag nu den säkra grunden vunnit (1921)
- Nu dagen är till ända (1986)

=== Hymn books ===
- Andliga Sånger (1898), samlingsverk.
- Från Betlehem till Golgata (1882), andliga sånger
- Vid juletid (1887), psalmer
- I livets vår (1888)
- Kristna högtids- och helgdagar (1889), sånger och psalmer

=== Misc ===
- Studier rörande reformerna inom den franska vitterheten under sextonde och nittonde seklen (Studies concerning the reforms in the French literature of the sixteenth and nineteenth centuries) (1868)
- Utgav och skrev en biografisk inledning till E. Björcks "Valda dikter" (1869)
- Inledning till D. Klockhoffs "Efterlemnade skrifter" (1871).
- Prolog vid sällskapsspektaklet till förmån för skandinavisk-etnografiska samlingen (1879)
- Vid tvåhundraårsfesten till Calderons minne (1881)
- Sång över Esaias Tegnér (1882)
- Rafael (1883)
- Sång vid Svenska akademiens hundraårsfest (1886)
- Claes Livijn, ett självständigt bidrag till forskningen över Nya skolan.

Cultural offices
Preceded by Carl Wilhelm Böttiger	Swedish Academy; Seat No.8; 1879-1912	Succeeded by Verner von Heidenstam
