= Claude Marcus =

Swedish pediatrician

Claude Nils Gustaf Marcus (born August 19, 1952 in Stockholm, Sweden) is a pediatrician at Karolinska University Hospital and Professor at the Karolinska Institute, most notably renowned for his research relating to childhood obesity.

== Career ==
Marcus graduated with a Medical Degree from the Karolinska Institute in Solna, Sweden in 1978. He thereafter practiced clinical medicine and became a pediatrician in 1985. In 1988 he achieved a Doctoral Degree, focusing on fat cells for newly born children. He was subsequently granted a postdoctoral research position (Docent) in pediatrics at the Karolinska Institute. In 1996 he founded the National Childhood Obesity Center. On May 15, 2000, he was appointed professor in Pediatric Care at the Karolinska Institute.

In 2005 Marcus initiated the Swedish National Quality Registry for Childhood Obesity.

To date he has published over two hundred articles in international journals. His primary research area related to the regulating of fat cell metabolism as well as clinical obesity and diabetes.

== Media appearance ==
Marcus regularly appears in various media outlets in debates relating to childhood obesity. In particular, he has propagated the introduction of a so-called "sugar changeover tax" in, which would increase the price of unhealthy, sugary products such as confectioneries and soda and in turn subsidise a decrease of the Value Added Tax (VAT) on fresh fruit and vegetables.

Marcus has also argued against the so-called Low Carb High Fat Diet (LCHF) and asserts that a high intake of saturated fat is harmful for the body and may cause cardiovascular disease.

== Early life and personal interests ==
Marcus is son to the painter and sculptor Gert Marcus and the poet Anne-Marie Söderlund. As a child he attended the highly acclaimed Adolf Fredrik's Music School in Stockholm, but after high school chose to pursue a career in medicine. Marcus has dedicated much of his spare time as a basketball coach for youth and adolescents in various basketball clubs in Stockholm.
