= Joa Helgesson =

Swedish baritone opera singer

Joa Rasmus Helgesson
- Born: 19 February 1981 (age 45); Stockholm, Sweden
- Other names: Opera Beast, Commander Octopus
- Education: University College of Opera Opera; Mälardalens Högskola Classical Vocal Training; Shanghai Theatre Academy Acting; Rytmus Stockholm Bass and Song; Adolf Fredrik's Music School Choir
- Occupations: Opera singer; Performance artist
- Years active: 2000–present
- Spouse: Anna Zakrisson
- Children: 1
- Website: https://joahelgesson.net/

Joa Helgesson (born 19 February 1981 in Blackeberg, Stockholm, Sweden) is a Swedish baritone opera singer and performance artist currently living in Berlin.

== Early life ==
Growing up in Blackeberg, Stockholm, Helgesson was involved in music and singing from an early age. He formed a death-metal band at the age of twelve while attending Adolf Fredrik's Music School (Swedish: Adolf Fredriks Musikklasser), a school in Stockholm known for its song and choral curriculum. He continued performing bass and vocals in various bands while studying bass and song at Rytmus High School. In 2000, Helgesson was involved in a collaborative music project between young musicians from Sweden, China and the USA, coordinated by Ross School and tutored by several professional musicians including producer and composer, Quincy Jones, which led him to Shanghai Theatre Academy where he studied acting. Upon returning to Sweden, Helgesson attended the chamber music program at Mälardalens Högskola, where he began his training in classical singing, which he then completed at the University College of Opera in Stockholm.

== Opera ==
Helgesson's talent was recognised early, and he was accepted at the National Opera Studio in London. From there he moved to the Opera Studio of Opernhaus Zürich, where he was able to work with conductors Bernard Haitink, Zubin Mehta, Nello Santi, and Ingo Metzmacher. During this time Helgesson was the cover for Thomas Hampson in Verdi's I masnadieri.

Throughout his career, Helgesson has demonstrated his range in numerous styles, from classical and baroque opera to world premieres and original compositions. He has performed around 50 parts including Barbiere, Don Giovanni, Eugene Onegin, Billy Budd, Escamillo in Carmen, and Enrico. He has performed in China at the Beijing Modern Music Festival, and throughout Europe at venues such as Berliner Philharmonie, Markgräfliches Opernhaus im Rahmen der Bayreuther Festspiele, Göteborgsoperan, Norrlandsoperan, Berwaldhallen, Stockholm Concert Hall, Tonhalle Zürich, Opern Halle, Gare du Nord Basel, Reykjavik Arts Festival and Oslo Ultima Festival. From 2012-2015, Helgesson was house baritone for Landestheater Schleswig-Holstein.

Helgesson was a member of the Gothenburg Opera in Sweden from 2017 to 2019, appearing as The Phantom of the Opera, and as Dom Claude Frollo in Disney's The Hunchback of Notre Dame.

In early 2020 during the coronavirus pandemic, Helgesson performed opera from the balcony of Norrbottenteatern and was streamed on national television and radio in Sweden.

== Notable performances ==
- Tristan & Isolde (Kurwenal) at Folkoperan, Stockholm, Sweden (2020)
- Don Giovanni (Don Giovanni), Norrlandsoperan (2020)
- Phantom of the Opera (Phantom), Göteborgsoperan (2017–2018)
- Kärleksmaskinen (Ion) at Piteå Chamber Opera and NEO (2020)
- Eugene Onegin (Onegin) at Schleswig-Holsteinisches Landestheater, Germany (2014)
- The Barber of Seville (Figaro) at Schleswig-Holsteinisches Landestheater, Germany (2012–2013)
- Madama Butterfly (Sharpless) at Schleswig-Holsteinisches Landestheater, Germany (2013–2014)
- Billy Budd (Billy Budd) Göteborgsoperan (2013)

== Performance Art ==
Helgesson is currently based in Berlin, performing under the name Opera Beast, creating performance art pieces that push the boundaries of classical singing, combining opera with fakir performances in collaboration with the Body Suspension community.

Helgesson also performs with his wife, Dr. Anna Zakrisson, combining opera and science to create unique performances. They performed together at the Halland Opera & Vocal Festival. Helgesson and Zakrisson were interviewed by Ronja von Rönne for the ARTE program Street Philosophy in 2019 about their alternative lifestyle. As part of a performance art and satire project, Helgesson developed the character Commander Octopus who is in a played feud with Doctor Anna from Doctor Anna's Imaginarium on social media.

== Political engagement ==
Helgesson is an active union member and is a board member of the Swedish Union for Theater.
