= The Real Group =

Swedish a cappella group

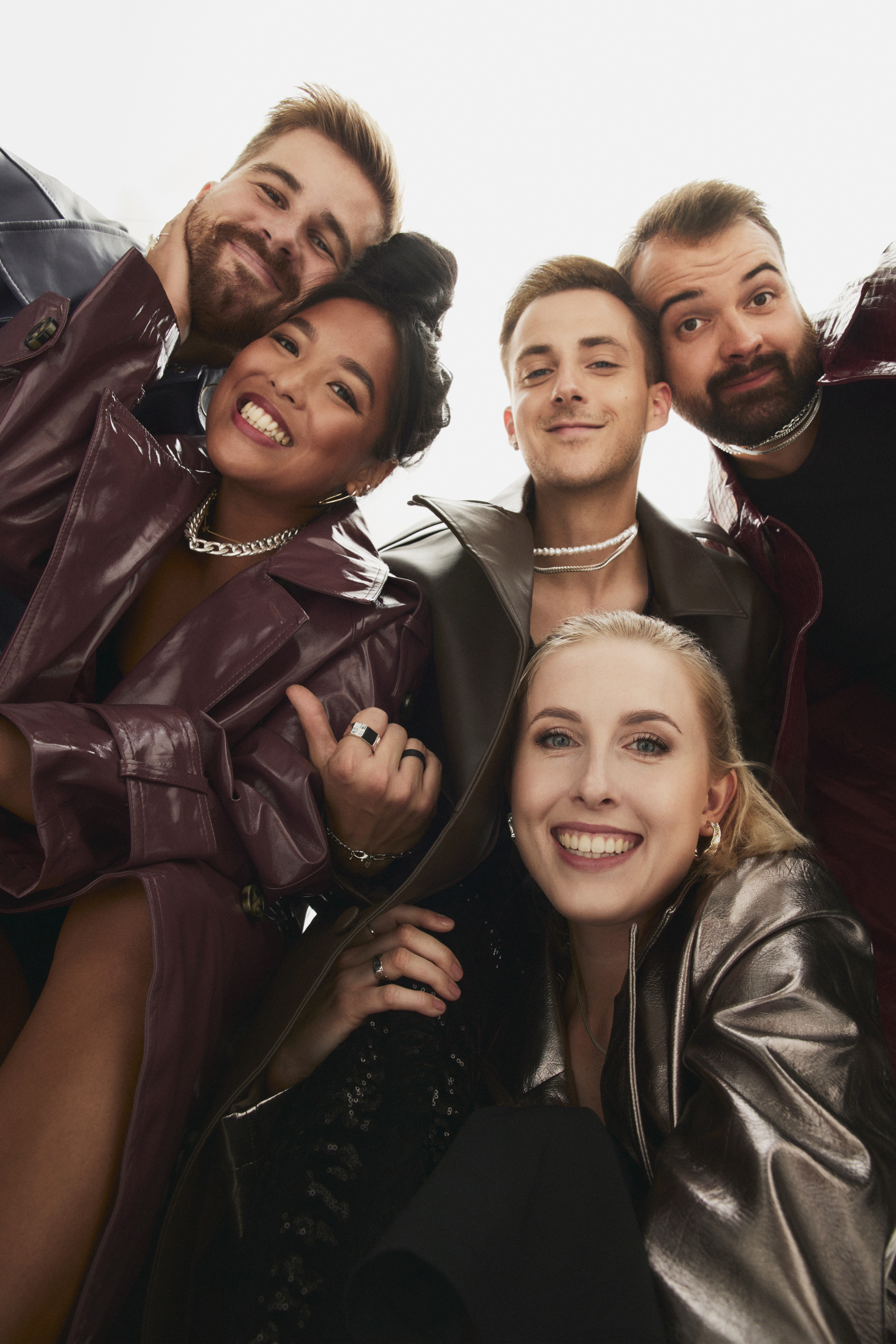
- (From left) Daniele Dees, Joanné Nugas, Johannes Rücker Becker, Axel Berntzon, Clara Fornander

Background information
- Origin: Stockholm, Sweden
- Genres: A cappella, vocal jazz, pop
- Years active: 1984–present
- Members: Clara Fornander; Joanné Pastor Nugas; Johannes Rückert Becker; Axel Berntzon; Daniele Dees
- Past members: Margareta Bengtson; Johanna Nyström; Peder Karlsson; Anders Jalkéus; Anders Edenroth; Katarina Henryson; Morten Vinther Sørensen
- Website: therealgroup.se

The Real Group is an a cappella group from Sweden. Members are Clara Fornander, Joanné Pastor Nugas, Johannes Rückert Becker, Axel Berntzon and Daniele Dees. The group's members compose and arrange most of their songs. They sing in English and Swedish and cite American vocalist Bobby McFerrin as an inspiration.

== Background ==
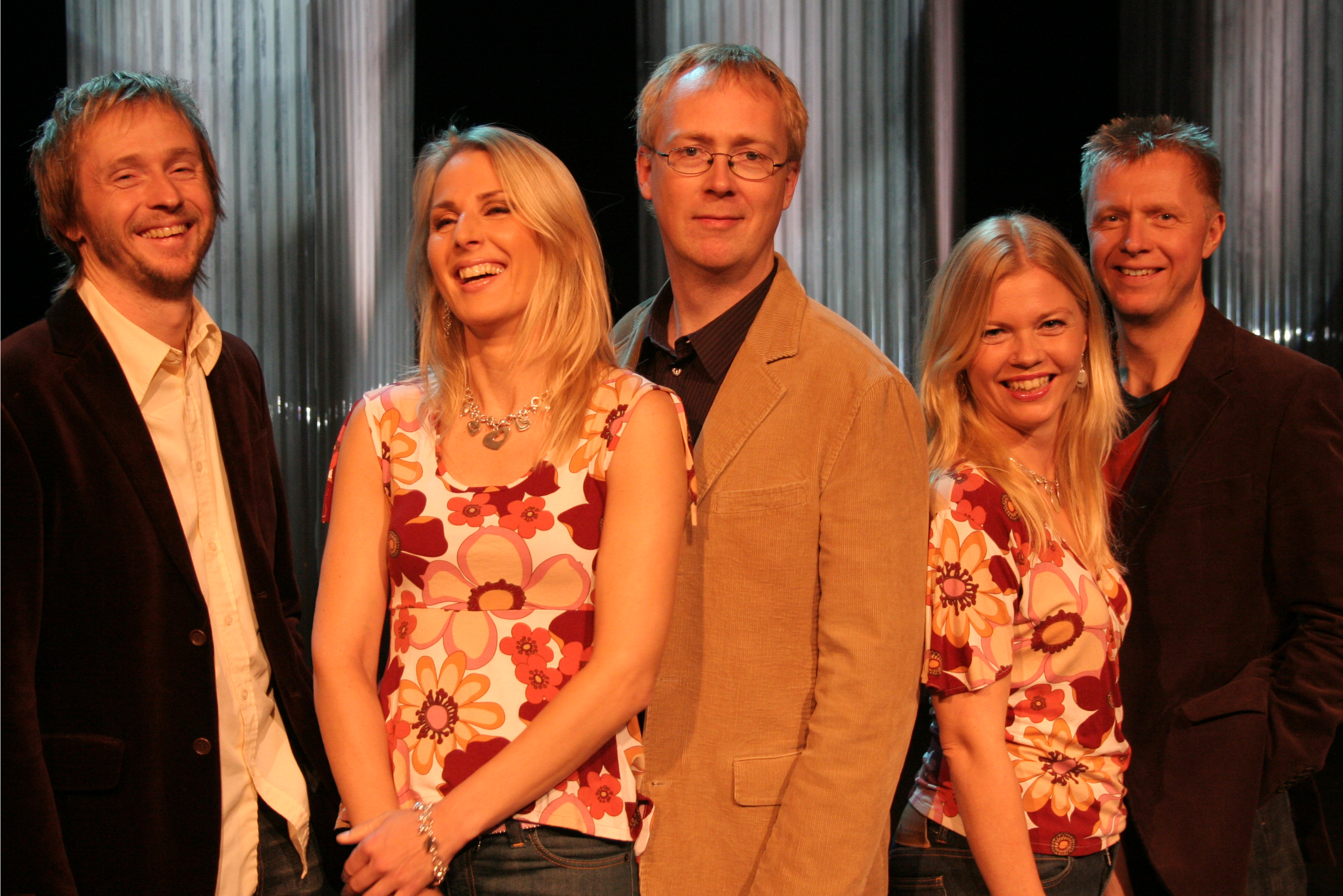
The Real Group original members: Anders Edenroth, Margareta Bengtson, Peder Karlsson, Katarina Henryson, Anders Jalkéus

The Real Group has performed more than 2000 concerts worldwide. In 2002, the Real Group performed at the opening ceremony of the FIFA World Cup in Seoul, South Korea, to an audience of 60,000. On 22 December 1993, to celebrate the fiftieth birthday of Queen Silvia of Sweden, the Real Group backed up former ABBA member Anni-Frid Lyngstad in a performance of the ABBA hit "Dancing Queen", using an a cappella arrangement that was released on the album Varför får man inte bara vara som man är.

The Real Group was formed in 1984 when its members were students at the Royal College of Music in Stockholm. All of them attended Adolf Fredrik's Music School. Margareta Bengtson was the soprano in the group at its inception, but she left to work on solo albums in 2006. Johanna Nyström filled her spot for some time until Emma Nilsdotter replaced her in 2008 and had her first appearance with the group in Kremlin Palace. Johanna Nyström also filled in for both Margareta Bengtson and Katarina Henryson when they were on maternity leave or otherwise away. Morten Vinther Sørensen joined the group in 2010 to replace Peder Karlsson, who shifted his focus to develop The Real Academy. In 2015 Jānis Strazdiņš joined the group as the bass after Anders Jalkéus retired for health reasons.

On 19 January 2016, the Real Group announced that Lisa Östergren would replace Katarina Henryson.

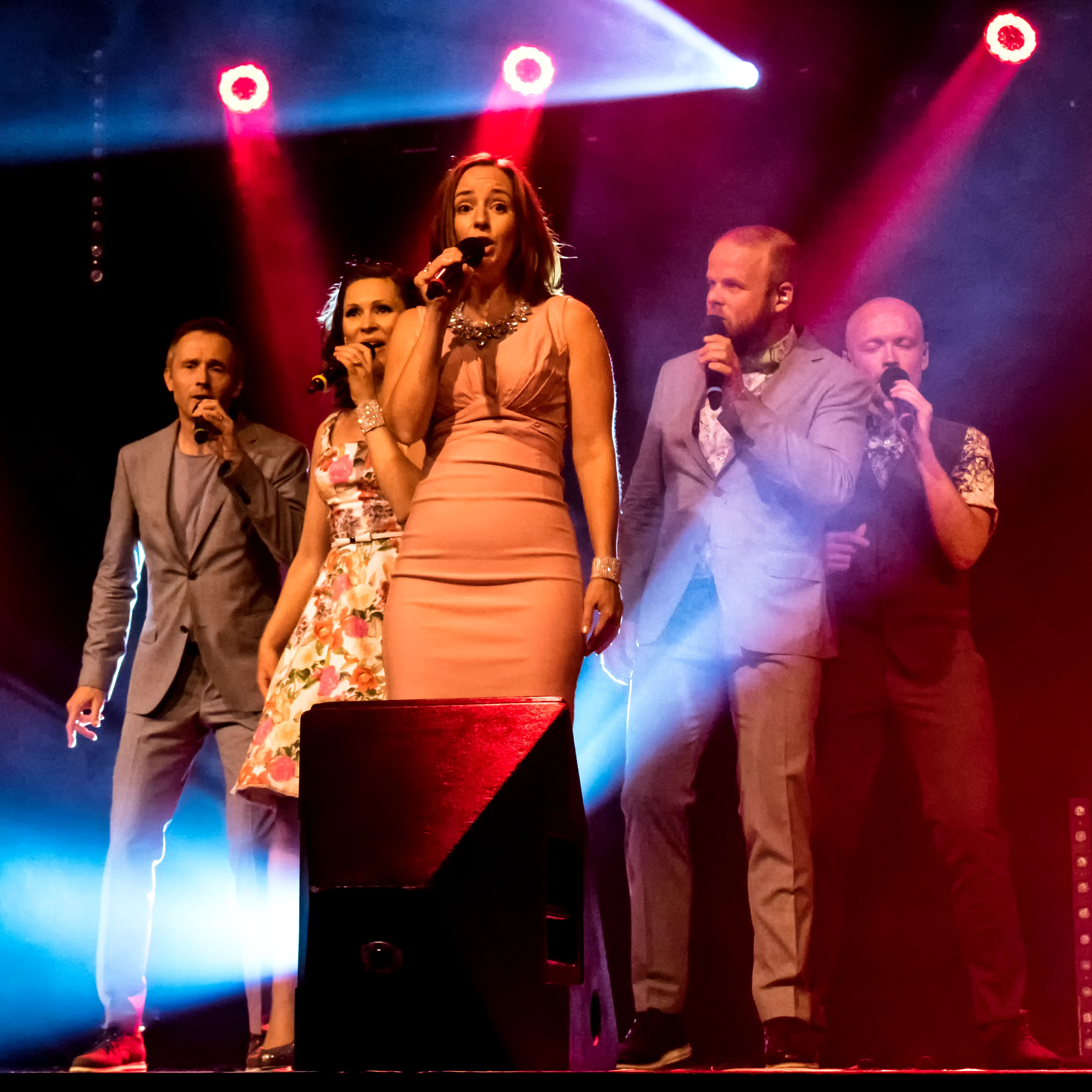
(From left) Anders Edenroth, Emma Nilsdotter, Lisa Östergren, Morten Vinther Sørensen, Jānis Strazdiņš

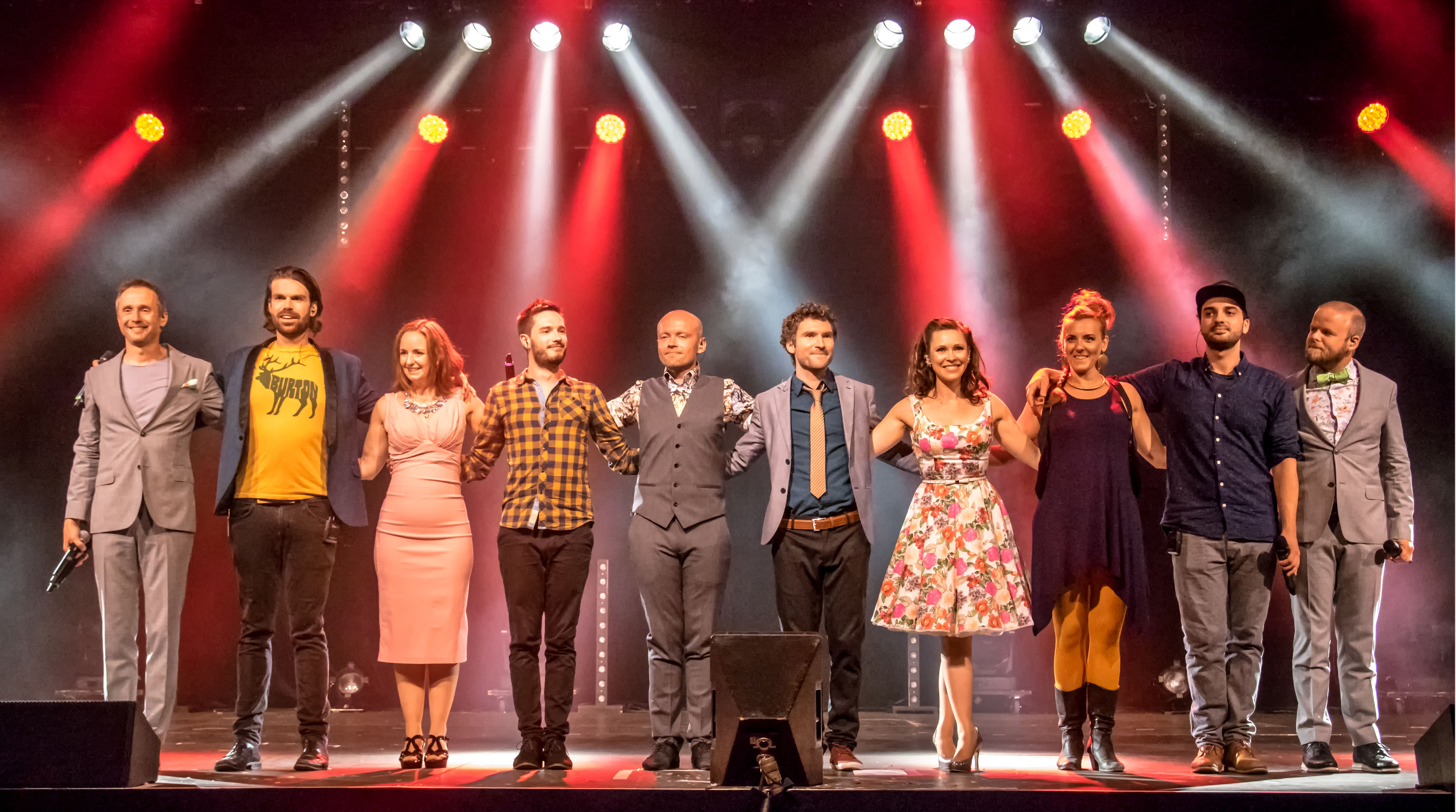
The Real Group with Unduzo at the Zelt-Musik-Festival 2016 in Freiburg, Germany

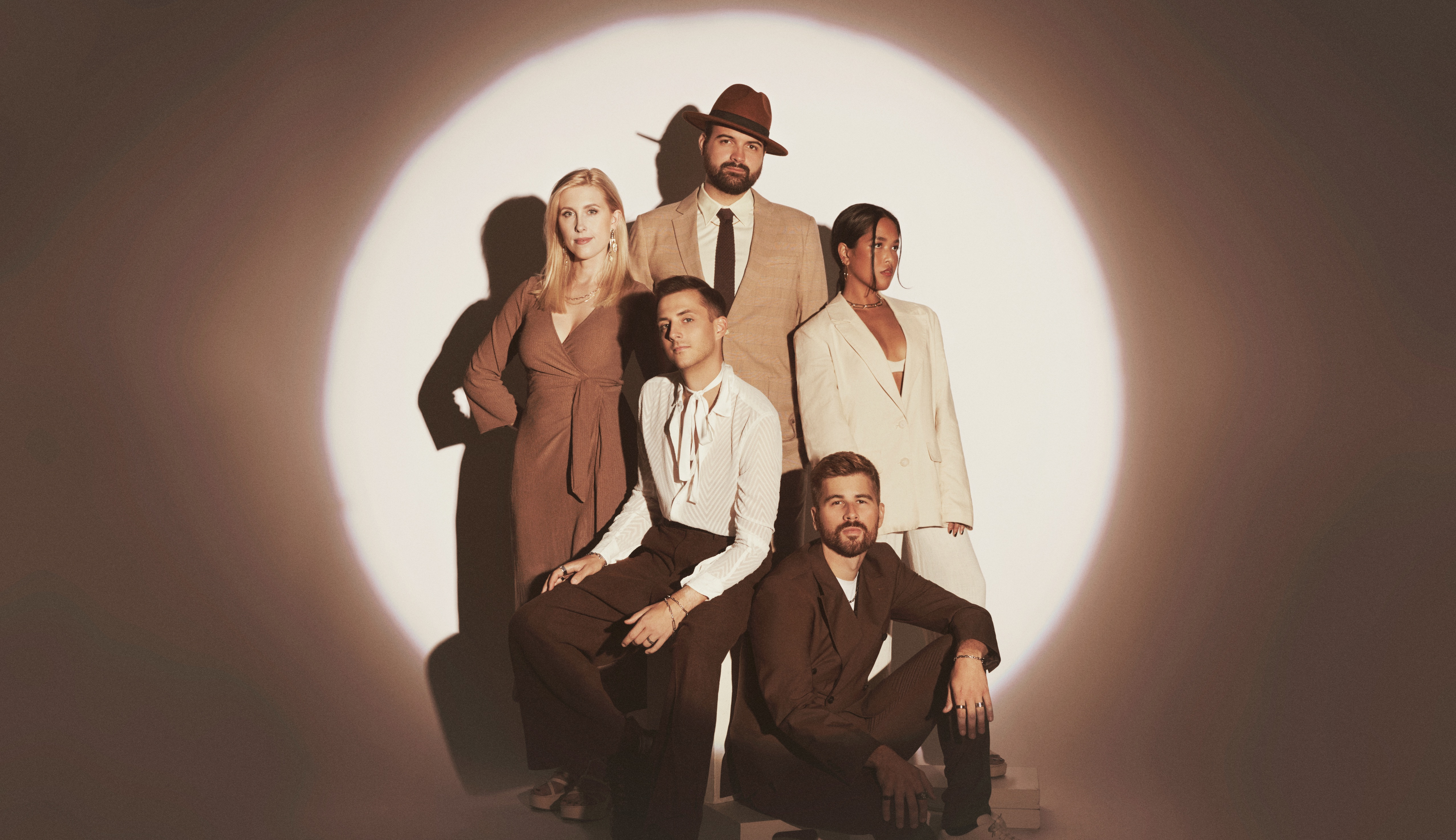

== Discography ==
Date of release	Title	Notes
1987	Debut	Thirteen tracks, three in Swedish and the rest in English. Recorded around two microphones onto 2-track tape, where the singers adjusted balance by controlling their distance from the microphone. (Caprice)
1989	Nothing But the Real Group	Twelve tracks, all in English (Caprice)
1991	Röster	Twelve tracks, all in Swedish (Caprice)
1994	Varför får man inte bara vara som man är?	Fourteen tracks, most in Swedish, including a cover of Abba's Dancing Queen with Anni-Frid Lyngstad (Gazell)
1994	Unreal!	(Town Crier)
1996	Ori:ginal	Twelve tracks, all in Swedish
1996	Get:real	
March 19, 1996	Live in Stockholm	Released in Sweden under the title jazz:live. Ten tracks in English, one in Swedish, one with no lyrics. All tracks are live performances in concert. (Town Crier)
1997	En riktig jul	Title translates: A Real Christmas. Thirteen tracks, all in Swedish
1998	One for All	Sixteen tracks, one in Swedish, accompanied by Toots Thielemans on harmonica.
2000	Commonly Unique	Thirteen tracks, all English
2001	Allt Det Bästa	Title translates: All The Best. Twenty tracks, in a mix of Swedish and English.
2002	Stämning	Twenty-two tracks, all in Swedish. Swedish folk songs, all choral in their musical style. The performances were recorded without overdubbing and were directed Eric Ericson. (EMI)
2003	Julen er her	Norwegian title translates: Christmas is here. Fifteen tracks: three in English, nine in Swedish, two in Norwegian, one with no lyrics. Four tracks are live performances in concert. Includes a video clip of a live performance of "Clown of the Jungle", an a cappella arrangement of the soundtrack to a Disney short film by the same name.
June 12, 2003	The Real Thing	Thirteen tracks: 5 in Swedish, rest in English. Two tracks were previously unreleased, a re-recorded version of "Dancing Queen" and "Song from the Snow" created for a Korean movie. (Dreambeat)
2005	In the Middle of Life	Thirteen tracks: twelve in English and one with no lyrics. The Korean-market version contains two additional tracks in English. (FMC)
June 25, 2008	Håll musiken i gång	Nine tracks, all in Swedish, three previously released. This album is a tribute to Swedish entertainer Povel Ramel, a fan of the Real Group and vice versa. The Real Group received Ramel's Karamelodiktstipendiet, a scholarship funded by Ramel, in 2002. The last track, "Konditori Forgätmigej", was written by Anders Edenroth in Povel's style. Margareta Bengtson joined the group in studio to record this album. (EMI)
September 16, 2009	The Real Album	Twelve tracks: ten in English and two with no lyrics. (Lionheart)
2012	The World for Christmas	Thirteen tracks: seven in English, four in Swedish, and two with no lyrics. It contains "The World for Christmas" composed and arranged by Anders Edenroth. (Universal)
2013	Live in Japan	Fifteen tracks: ten in English, five with no lyrics. Recorded live in April 2013 at the Billboard Jazz Club in Osaka and Tokyo. Two songs, "Catching the Big Fish" and "Lucky Luke", were composed by Morten Vinther Sørensen.
December 1, 2017	Elements	16 tracks: thirteen in English, two in Swedish, and one in Latvian.
September 4th, 2018	Friendship	11 tracks; joint production with Kicks & Sticks, the Hessen State Youth Orchestra.

== Awards and honors ==
- Contemporary A Cappella Recording Awards (CARAs):
  - 1995: Best Contemporary Cover: "Dancing Queen" from Varför får man inte bara vara som man är
  - 1995: Best Jazz Song: "Flight of the Foo-Birds" from Varför får man inte bara vara som man är
  - 1996: Best Female Vocalist: Margareta Bengtson
  - 1997: Live Album of the Year: Live in Stockholm
  - 1997: Best Original Pop Song: "Jag Vill Va Med Dig"
  - 1997: Best Jazz Song: "Waltz for Debby"
  - 1997: Best Female Vocalist: Margareta Bengtson
  - 1998: Best Holiday Album: En riktig jul
  - 2003: Best Classical Album: Stämning
  - 2003: Runner Up for Best Classical Song: "En vänlig grönskas rika dräkt" from Stämning
  - 2004: Best Holiday Album: Julen er her
  - 2004: Best Holiday Song: "Hark, the Herald Angels Sing" from Julen er her
- Other awards:
  - 2002 Karamelodiktstipendiet (in Swedish), an annual award given to a Swedish entertainer by Povel Ramel.

=== Timeline ===
Vertical lines are records, red line is the new generation TRG.
