= En vänlig grönskas rika dräkt =

1889 Carl David af Wirsén hymn

- Christian hymn by Carl David af Wirsén
- Language: Swedish
- Composed: 1889

"En vänlig grönskas rika dräkt..." ("A Friendly Green Does Richly Dress..."), also called Sommarpsalm ("Summer Hymn"), is a popular 1889 Swedish summer hymn by the civil servant Carl David af Wirsén, and his only well-known work.

== Summer hymn ==
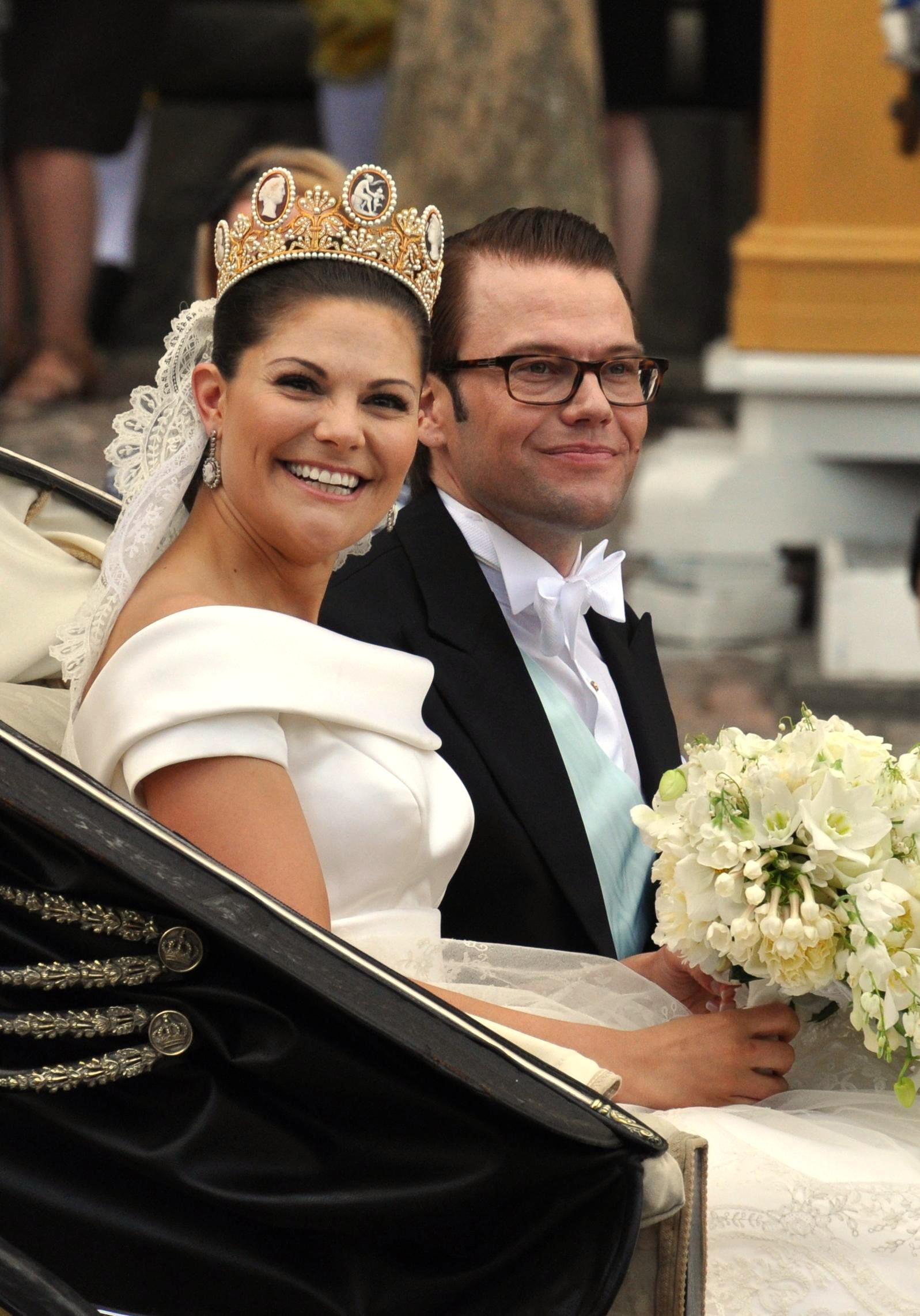
The summer hymn was sung for the Swedish royal wedding in June 2010.

En vänlig grönskas rika dräkt is one of Sweden's best loved summer hymns, whether sung in unison or in parts. For example, Crown Princess Victoria of Sweden chose the hymn for her wedding to Daniel Westling in June 2010. In 2002, the hymn reached the Swedish pop music charts in a recording by The Real Group on the 2002 album Stämning, scoring a Svensktoppen hit for six weeks between 15 June and 13 July 2002.

The first Swedish hymnbook to include the hymn was Nya psalmer 1921, where it was number 644. The melody was composed by S. Gastorius in 1675. The melody used in most later hymnbooks is from a 1933 choral composition by Waldemar Åhlén (1894–1982).

In 2016-2017 the melody was used in a Länsförsäkringar TV commercial film.

== Reception ==
Cordelia Edvardson, writing in Svenska Dagbladet, identifies the hymn as a beloved example of popular poetry, part of the Swedish people's cultural heritage. So for example, she writes, in verse two "the dizzy birds" (de yra fåglarna) express the joy of summertime.

Carlhåkan Larsén, reviewing Per Rydén's book about Carl David af Wirsén in Sydsvenskan, describes Wirsén as a loser on the dark side of literary history, only one of whose poems still survives: the summer hymn, En vänlig grönskas rika dräkt.

Hans Holmberg, writing in Kristianstadsbladet, notes that the hymn is part of Sweden's summer repertoire, and that people usually sing "only the first three verses, which are a hymn of praise to summer." But, observes Holmberg, the remaining verses are quite different: they give a feeling of decay, with the biblical phrase "All flesh is grass". The hymn, writes Holmberg, switches repeatedly between life and praise on the one hand, and death and decay on the other. En vänlig grönskas rika dräkt can be and is used both as a summer hymn and for funerals: but, remarks Holmberg, "I find it hard to imagine an occasion when the hymn is sung in its entirety". In fact, Holmberg concludes, while Wirsén is now derided as a dusty permanent secretary to the Swedish Academy, he was actually too bold for us to follow nowadays.

== Publication history ==
- Hemlandssånger 1892 as no. 408 under heading Kärleken (Love) with melodies by Georg Stolpe and August Elfåker, neither of which are used in the Swedish hymnal.
- Nya psalmer 1921 as no. 644 under headings Tidens skiften: Årets tider: Sommaren (Changing times: Seasons: Summer).
- 1937 års psalmbok as no. 476 under heading Sommaren (Summer).
- Cantarellen 1984 as no. 23.
- 1986 års psalmbok as no. 201 (copied into several other hymnals).
- Lova Herren 1988 as no. 789 under heading Årets tider (Seasons).
- Sångboken 1998 as no. 22.

== Sources ==
- Libris
- Den svenska sångboken (The Swedish songbook)
