= Jan Kyhle =

Swedish opera and musical singer

Jan Kyhle (born Jan Ingemar Kyhle on 25 August 1961) is a Swedish opera and musical singer. He is a tenor, although until 1991 he was a baritone.

== Opera career ==
As a student Jan Kyhle attended the Adolf Fredrik's Music School in Stockholm. He began his singing career in the bands Lustans Lakejer and Reeperbahn in the early 1980s and then applied to the University College of Opera, Stockholm (Operahögskolan). In 1991, he had his breakthrough when he sang the role of Siegmund in The Valkyrie at the Royal Swedish Opera in Stockholm. Some of his other roles in opera are:

- Pelléas in Pelléas and Mélisande by Debussy (1993, Royal Swedish Opera).
- The title role in Doktor Glas by Arne Mellnäs (1994, Royal Swedish Opera).
- Siegmund in The Valkyrie by Wagner:
  - In 2001 and 2003 at the Scottish Opera in Edinburgh and Glasgow.
  - In 2004 and 2006 at the Gothenburg Opera.
- Grigory in Boris Godunov by Mussorgsky (2005, Gothenburg opera).
- The Prince in Rusalka by Dvořák (2006, Norrland Opera).
- The title role in Parsifal by Wagner (2007, Gothenburg Opera).

== Musicals ==
He has also sung roles in musicals, including:

- Passarino in The Phantom of the Opera by Andrew Lloyd Webber (1989, Stockholm)
- Raoul in the same musical (1992)
- Jean Valjean in Les Misérables by Claude-Michel Schönberg:
  - In 2000 at the Gothenburg Opera.
  - In 2001 at the Malmö Opera and Music Theatre.
- Guido in Nine by Maury Yeston (2002, Malmö Opera and Musical Theatre).
