= Anna Zakrisson =

Swedish science communicator (born 1980)

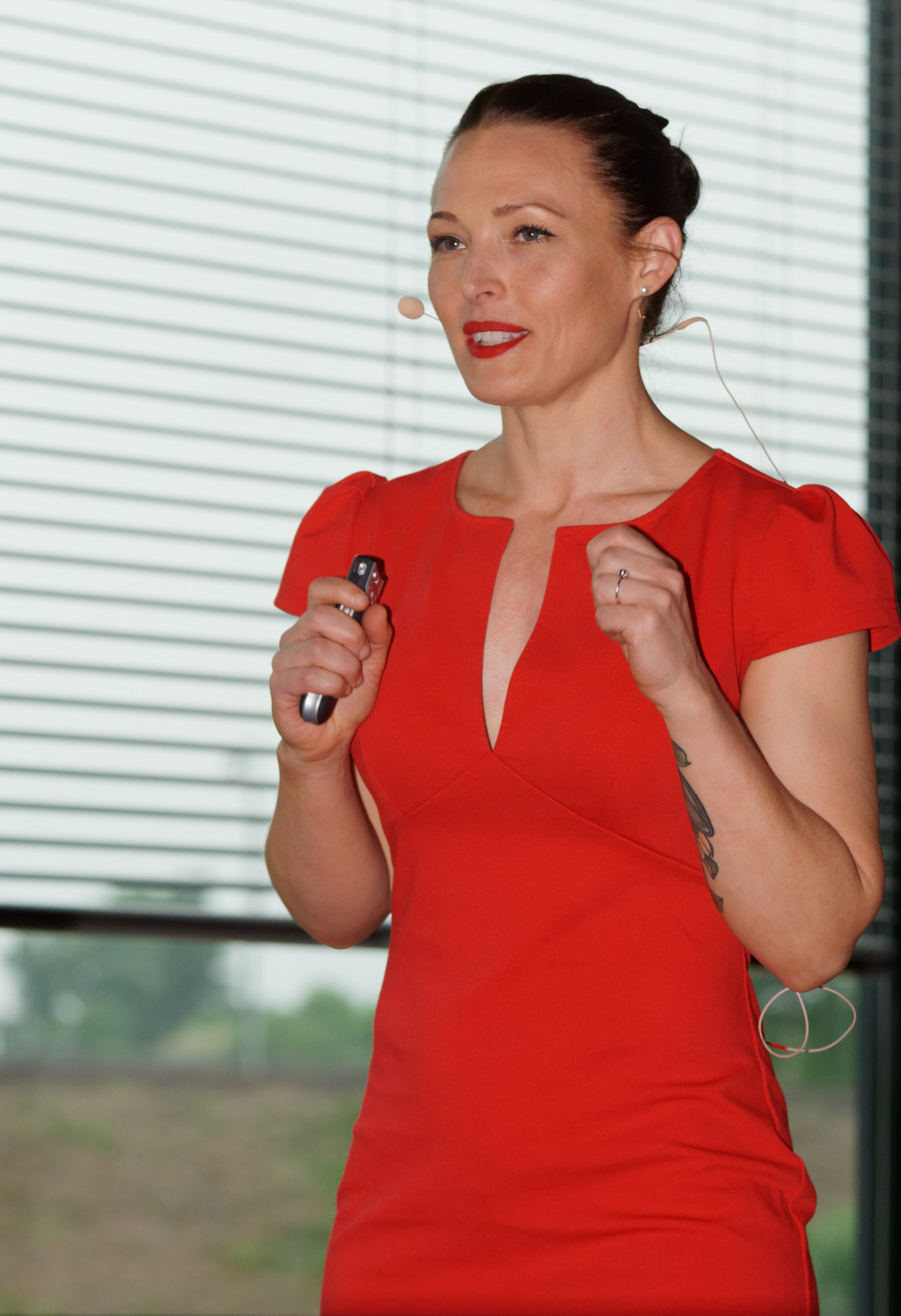
- Zakrisson (2018)
- Born: 31 March 1980 (age 46); Stockholm, Sweden
- Citizenship: Swedish
- Education: Lucy Cavendish College, Cambridge
- Alma mater: Stockholm University
- Spouse: Joa Helgesson
- Scientific career
- Fields: Science Communicator, Consultant
- Workplaces: Max-Planck-Institute; Charité; Zageno
- Thesis: External Growth Control of Baltic Sea Cyanobacteria (2015)
- Doctoral advisor: Prof. Ulf Larsson
- Other academic advisors: Dr. Jacob Walve, Prof. Elena Gorokhova
- Anna Zakrisson's voice Recorded May 2018
- Website: https://annasimaginarium.com/

Anna Zakrisson (born 31 March 1980) is a Swedish science communicator and scientist living in Berlin.

== Life ==
Born in Sollentuna, Stockholm, Sweden, Zakrisson grew up in Stockholm; her father was a hydrologist and her mother is a medical doctor. She moved to Fagersta Municipality in Västmanland County in 1988 and left Sweden in 1997 for journeys to California, Asia and Africa. She studied at Lucy Cavendish College, Cambridge and Stockholm University where she completed her doctoral thesis in 2015 entitled "External Growth Control of Baltic Sea Cyanobacteria". From 2004 to 2006 she worked as a researcher for Max-Planck-Institute Cologne. She is the mother of a daughter, born 2008. In 2012, she moved to Berlin and worked as a biologist and for Charité.

In an interview with Annika Merkelbach for Skeptical Inquirer, when asked her academic career Zakrisson replied that "...I didn't want to stay in academia... The system sucks. I think it's built to remove all that wonder and childish enthusiasm that, in my opinion, should be the foundation of science."

As of 2018, she is a resident of Berlin, Germany, and worked as a freelancer in science communication for a two years before founding her consulting company Anna's Imaginarium GmbH & Co KG.

In 2019 Zakrisson married internationally active opera singer Joa Helgesson with whom she collaborates closely to create performative science lectures.

== Science communication ==
Zakrisson was Head of Content of Zageno and worked as a biotechnical consultant there. She founded her platform Doctor Anna's Imaginarium in 2015. Zakrisson told Annika Merkelbach that "my absolutely favorite audience are those ... with no background whatsoever in science. To see those faces light up in sudden understanding of some aspects of their bodies or the world around them is fantastic and rewarding beyond belief." She also does science performances together with artists including opera singers, fakirs and dancers.

One of Zakrisson's main area of concern in science communication is addressing the anti-vaccine movement. She calls it "an extremely dangerous movement."

She has become more concerned with Homeopathy since homeopathic remedies for Ebola and HIV were introduced.

On the subject of women in science, Zakrisson believes that "it's important for young female scientists to be able to see the diversity of women who do science."

Zakrisson has cooperated with a museum in the United Kingdom to advocate for early diagnostics for conditions such as Colorectal cancer.

She was a speaker at the German GWUP conference SkepKon in 2018. She is also active in the skeptical movement and is a member of the Swedish Skeptics Society (Föreningen Vetenskap och Folkbildning).

== Publications ==
- Control of Sodium Transport in Durum Wheat as Anna Zakrisson-Plogander. ASPB, March 2005. Plantphysiology, with Romola Davenport, Richard A. James, Mark Tester and Rana Munns.
- Do Baltic Sea diazotrophic cyanobacteria take up combined nitrogen in situ?. Journal of Plankton Research, Volume 36, Issue 5, 1 September 2014, pp. 1368–1380. Journal of Plankton Research, with Ulf Larsson and Helena Höglander.
- Regulation of heterocyst frequency in Baltic Sea Aphanizomenon sp.. Journal of Plankton Research, Volume 36, Issue 5, 1 September 2014, pp. 1357–1367. Journal of Plankton Research, with Ulf Larsson.
- External Growth Control of Baltic Sea Cyanobacteria. Doctoral thesis, 2015. Stockholm University, Faculty of Science, Department of Ecology, Environment and Plant Sciences. Stockholms Universitet
- Dietary supplements: health from the ocean?. Acta Physiologica 2015, 215, pp. 119–122. Online Library, with P. B. Persson.
- Did you know that your cravings might be microbes controlling your mind?. Acta Physiologica 2015, 215, pp. 165–166. Online Library
- Stress. Acta Physiologica 2016, 216, pp. 149–152. Online Library, with P. B. Persson.
- Tools in science. Acta Physiologica 2017, 220, pp. 3–6. Online Library, with C. Kronfoth.
- Preservation and Fixation Methods for Aquatic Organisms. Eureka Methods 1(1): e05. (2017) Eureka Methods with Rex J.
