= Margareta Bengtson =

Swedish singer

Margareta Bengtson (born 1966) (formerly Margareta Jalkéus, having married and divorced Real Group bandmate Anders Jalkeus) is the former soprano of The Real Group, a professional a cappella vocal jazz quintet from Sweden which she sang with for over twenty years.

== History and education ==
Bengtson comes from a very musical family. Her mother taught voice for many years and her father, now retired, was once the principal flautist in the Royal Swedish Opera's orchestra.

At age ten, she began studies at Adolf Fredrik's Music School in Stockholm, where she attended for ten years. She began playing the harp at 12.

In 1984, she entered the solo-harp class at the Royal College of Music in Stockholm, where she studied for 5 years. The same year she became a member of the vocal ensemble The Real Group. In 1987 the group was offered a course of advanced study at the college and this continued until 1989, when they gave three diploma concerts in Stockholm. The Real Group has been a professional ensemble since then.

== Solo album ==
On October 25, 2006, Bengtson released a solo jazz album "I'm Old Fashioned" with EMI, containing ten American jazz standards. All the arrangements are attributed to members of the band, who all are from Sweden as well. Pål Svenre was the producer.
