= Esaias Tegnér =

Swedish writer, professor of the Greek language, and bishop (1782–1846)

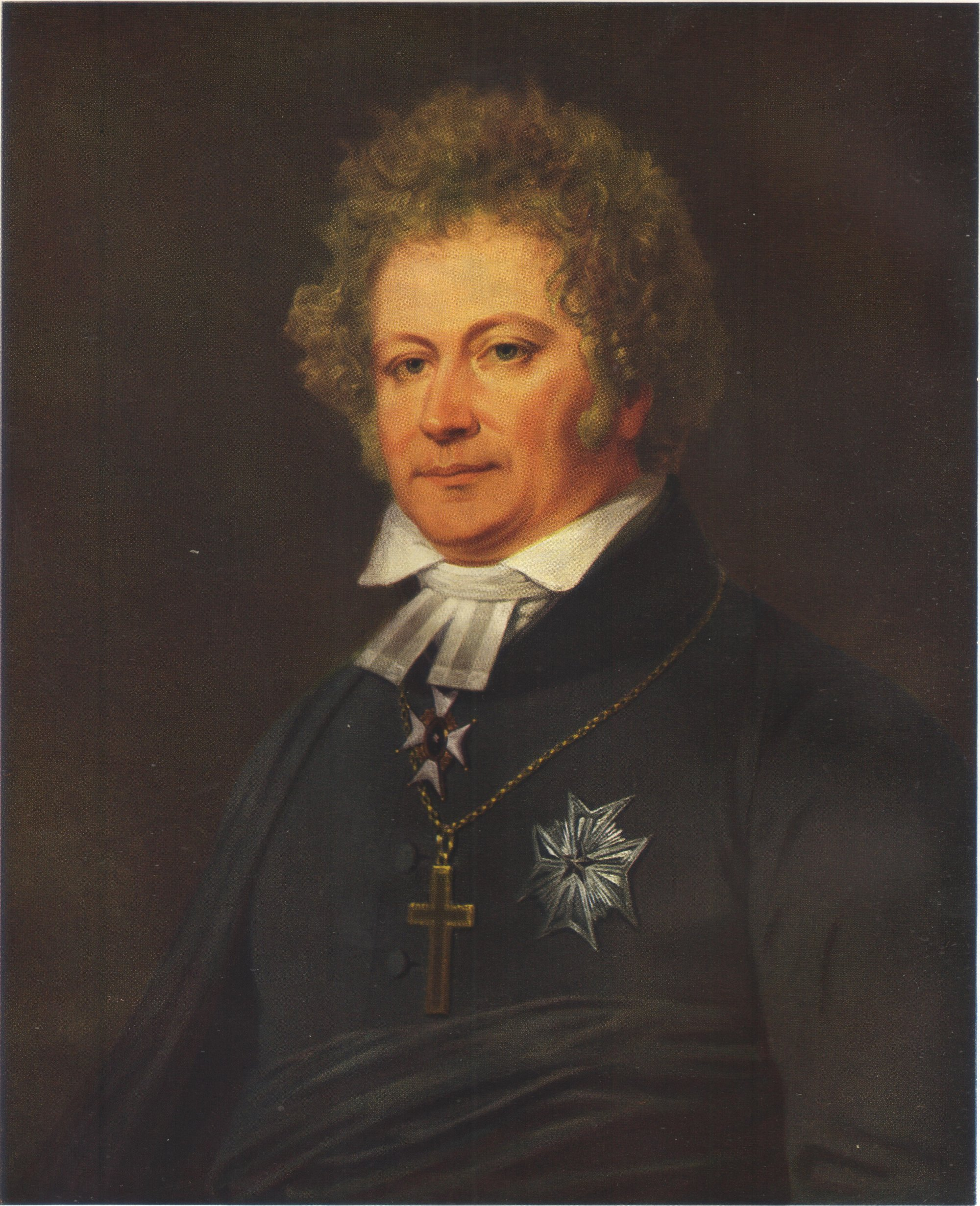
- Esaias Tegnér as portrayed by Johan Gustaf Sandberg, around 1826
- Born: Esaias Tegnér; 13 November 1782; Kyrkerud, Värmland, Sweden
- Died: 2 November 1846 (aged 63); Växjö, Småland, Sweden
- Spouse: Anna Maria Gustava Myhrman
- Children: Christoffer; Göthilda; Disa; Lars Gustaf
- Writing career
- Language: Swedish
- Notable work: Frithiof's Saga

Esaias Tegnér (Swedish: [tɛŋˈneːr]; 13 November 1782 – 2 November 1846) was a Swedish writer, professor of Greek, and bishop. During the 19th century, he was regarded as the father of modern poetry in Sweden, mainly through the national romantic epic Frithiof's Saga. He has been called Sweden's first modern man. Much is known about him, and he also wrote openly about himself.

== Early life ==
His father was a pastor, and his grandparents on both sides were peasants. His father, whose name had been Esaias Lucasson, took the surname of Tegnérus—altered by his fifth son, the poet, to Tegnér—from the village of Tegnaby in the province of Småland, where he was born. In 1792 Tegnérus died.

In 1799 Esaias Tegnér, hitherto educated in the country, entered Lund University, where he graduated in philosophy in 1802, and continued as tutor until 1810, when he was elected Greek lecturer. In 1806 he married Anna Maria Gustava Myhrman, to whom he had been attached since his earliest youth. In 1812 he was named professor, and continued to work as a lecturer in Lund until 1824, when he was made Bishop of Växjö. He remained in Växjö until his death, twenty-two years later.

He was comparatively slow in development. His first great success was a dithyrambic war-song for the army of 1808. In 1811 his patriotic poem Svea won the great prize of the Swedish Academy, and made him famous. In the same year was founded in Stockholm the Gothic League (Götiska förbundet), a sort of club of young and patriotic men of letters, of whom Tegnér quickly became the chief. The club published a magazine, entitled Iduna, in which it printed a great deal of excellent poetry, and ventilated its views, particularly as regards the study of Icelandic literature and old Norse history. Tegnér, Geijer, Afzelius, and Nicander became the most famous members of the Gothic League.

Nationalism at the time went hand in hand with liberalism, and Tegnér during his most productive period (1812–1824) also expressed his opinions on politics, which were evident as early as 1808 in poems such as Fördragsamhet (Tolerance), which was later rewritten and published as Fridsröster (Voices of Peace). In Hjelten (The Hero, 1813), he announces in the context of the French Revolution: "What is decayed shall be toppled / and the healthy new shall grow / out of destruction." In Den vaknade Örnen (The Awakened Eagle, 1815) he celebrates the return of Napoleon from Elba. In Nyåret 1816 (New Year 1816) he pours scorn on the reactionary politics of Metternich and the Holy Alliance. In a famous address given by Tegnér in 1817, he celebrates the Protestant Reformation as a breakthrough for human liberty and progress and praises the national liberation movements of his day. In Epilog vid magister-promotionen (Epilogue at the Master's Presentation, 1820), Tegnér also attacks reactionaries in the realm of literature. And in 1824 Tegnér writes: "We should not forget that the [reactionaries] have a couple of million bayonets at their disposal in Europe and thus, for the moment at least, are the strongest. It is not too much if each one who can wield a pen undertakes the cause of the liberals, which is nevertheless, above all, that of light and humanity."

=== Lund poems ===
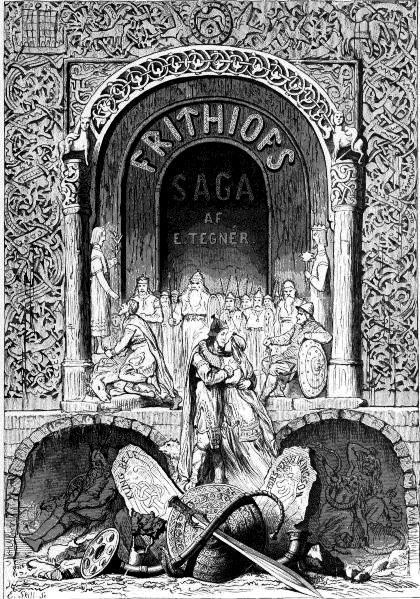
Title page of Frithiofs Saga (1876)

The majority of the many poems from Tegnér in Lund are short, but some are in lyrics. They are still shown to visitors as the Tegnér museum. His celebrated Song to the Sun dates from 1817. He completed three poems of a more ambitious character, on which his fame chiefly rests. Of these, the romance of Axel (1822) and the delicately chiselled idyl of Nattvardsbarnen (1820), translated by Longfellow, take a secondary place in comparison with Tegnér's masterpiece of worldwide fame. In 1819 he also became a member of the distinguished Swedish Academy, on seat 8.

=== Claim to recognition ===
In 1820 he published in Iduna fragments of an epic on which he was working: Frithjof's saga. In 1822 he published five more cantos, and in 1825 the entire poem. Already before its last canto it was famous throughout Europe; the aged Goethe took up his pen to commend to his countrymen this alte, kräftige, gigantischbarbarische Dichtart and desired Amalie von Imhoff to translate it into German. This romantic paraphrase of an ancient saga was composed in twenty-four cantos, all differing in verse form, modeled somewhat, on an earlier Danish masterpiece, Helge of Oehlenschläger.

Frithjof's saga was during the 19th century the best known of all Swedish productions. It is said to have been translated twenty-two times into English, twenty times into German, and once at least into every European language. It is far from satisfying the demands of more recent antiquarian research, but it still is allowed to give the freshest existing impression, in imaginative form, of life in early Scandinavia. A section of the work was later used by Max Bruch as the basis for his 1864 cantata Frithjof.

== Later life ==
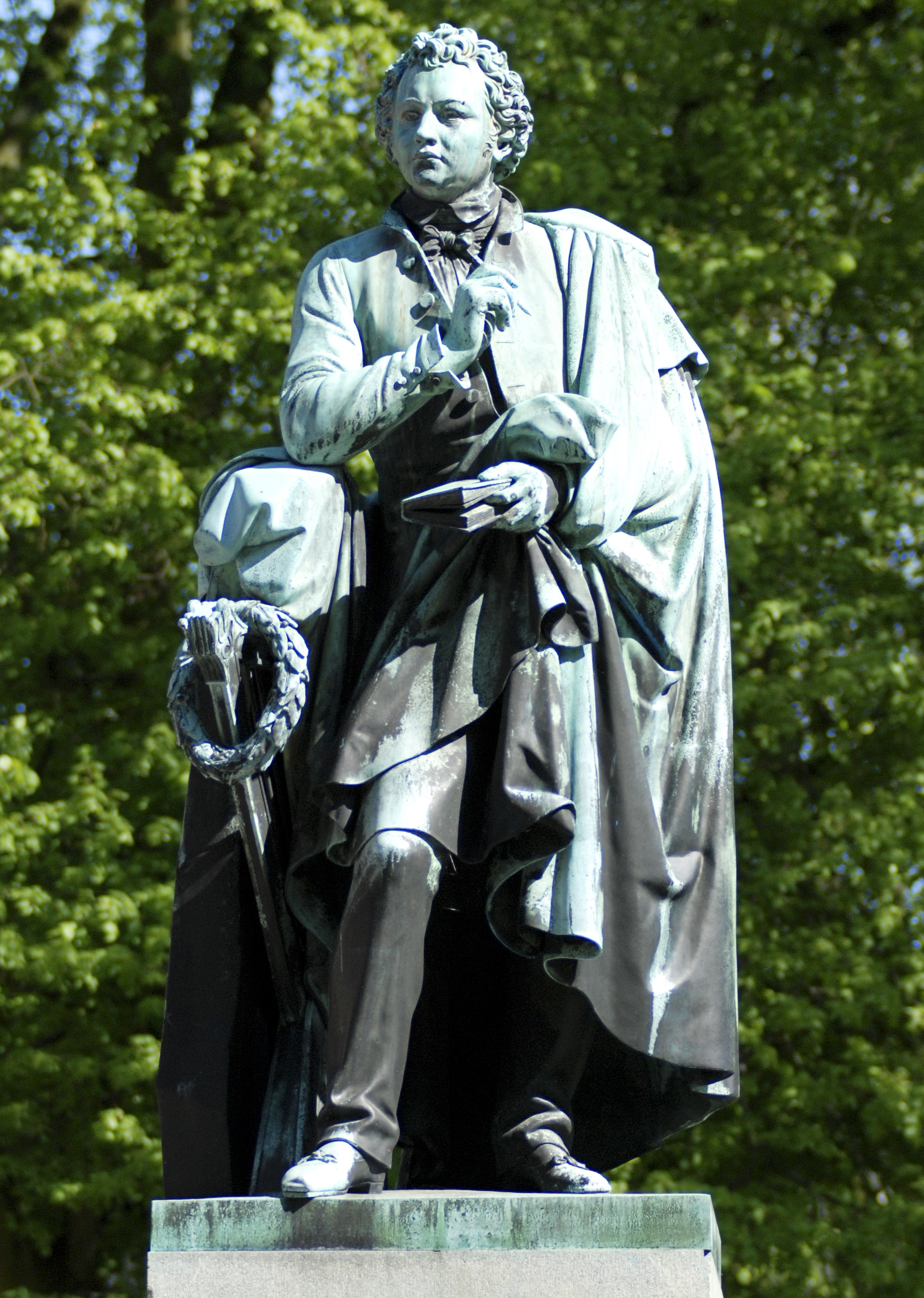
Statue of Tegnér, right by Lund Cathedral in central Lund

The period of the publication of Frithjof's saga (1825) was the critical epoch of his career. It made him one of the most famous poets in Europe. It transferred him from his study in Lund to the bishop's palace in Växjö; it marked the first breakdown of his health, which had hitherto been excellent; and it witnessed a singular moral crisis in the inner history of the poet, about which much has been written, but of which little is known. Tegnér was at this time passionately in love with a certain beautiful Euphrosyne Palm, the wife of a town councillor in Lund, and this unfortunate passion, while it inspired much of his finest poetry, turned the poet's blood to gall. From this time forward the heartlessness of woman is one of Tegnér's principal themes.

=== Bishop's seat ===
Tegnér, a man without Christian heritage and with little interest in formal religious matters was offered and accepted the bishop's crosier. Tegnér was poor; and anxious to get away from Lund. Despite regretting the decision, he did not go back on his decision and Tegnér made a respectable bishop as long as his health lasted. In 1835, he was elected a member of the Royal Swedish Academy of Sciences. He became moody and melancholy; as early as 1833 he complained of fiery heats in his brain, and in 1840, during a visit to Stockholm, he suddenly became insane.

=== Mental deterioration ===
He was sent to an asylum in Schleswig, and early in 1841 he was cured, and able to return to Växjö. In later years Tegnér began, but left unfinished, two important epic poems, Gerda and Kronbruden. It was during his convalescence in Schleswig that he composed Kronbruden. He wrote no more of importance; in 1843 he had a stroke of apoplexy, and on 2 November 1846 he died in Växjö.

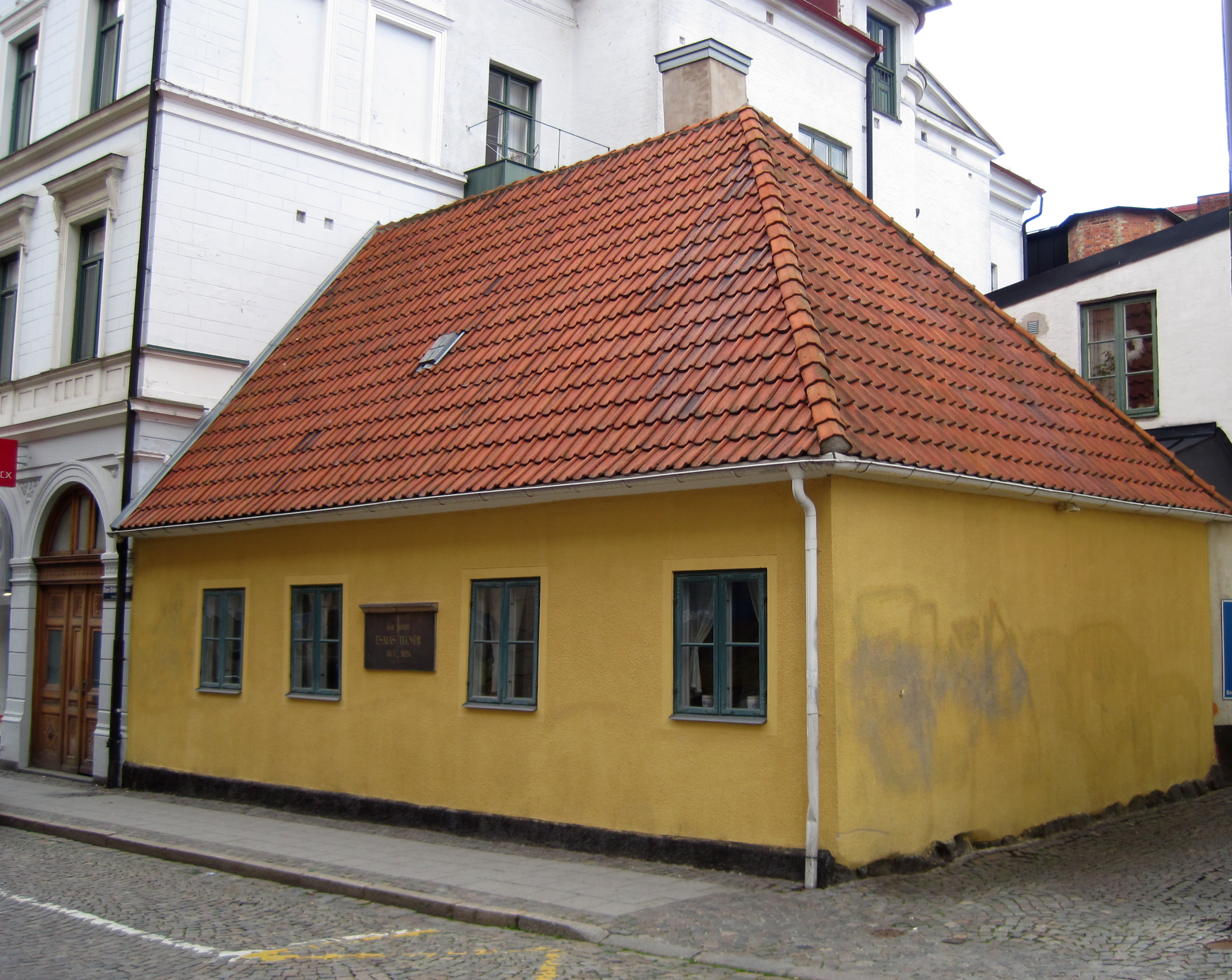
Tegnérmuseet in Lund

== Tegnérmuseet ==
Tegnérmuseet is a museum devoted exclusively to the life and work of Esaias Tegnér. The museum is located in the house where Esaias Tegnèr lived with his family from 1813 to 1826 in the city center of Lund. Since 1997, the museum has been part of the foundation Kulturen, which also operates the open-air museum in Lund.

== Notes ==
Cultural offices
Preceded by Johan Gabriel Oxenstierna	Swedish Academy, Seat No.8; 1818–1846	Succeeded by Carl Wilhelm Böttiger
