= Katija Dragojevic =

Swedish opera singer

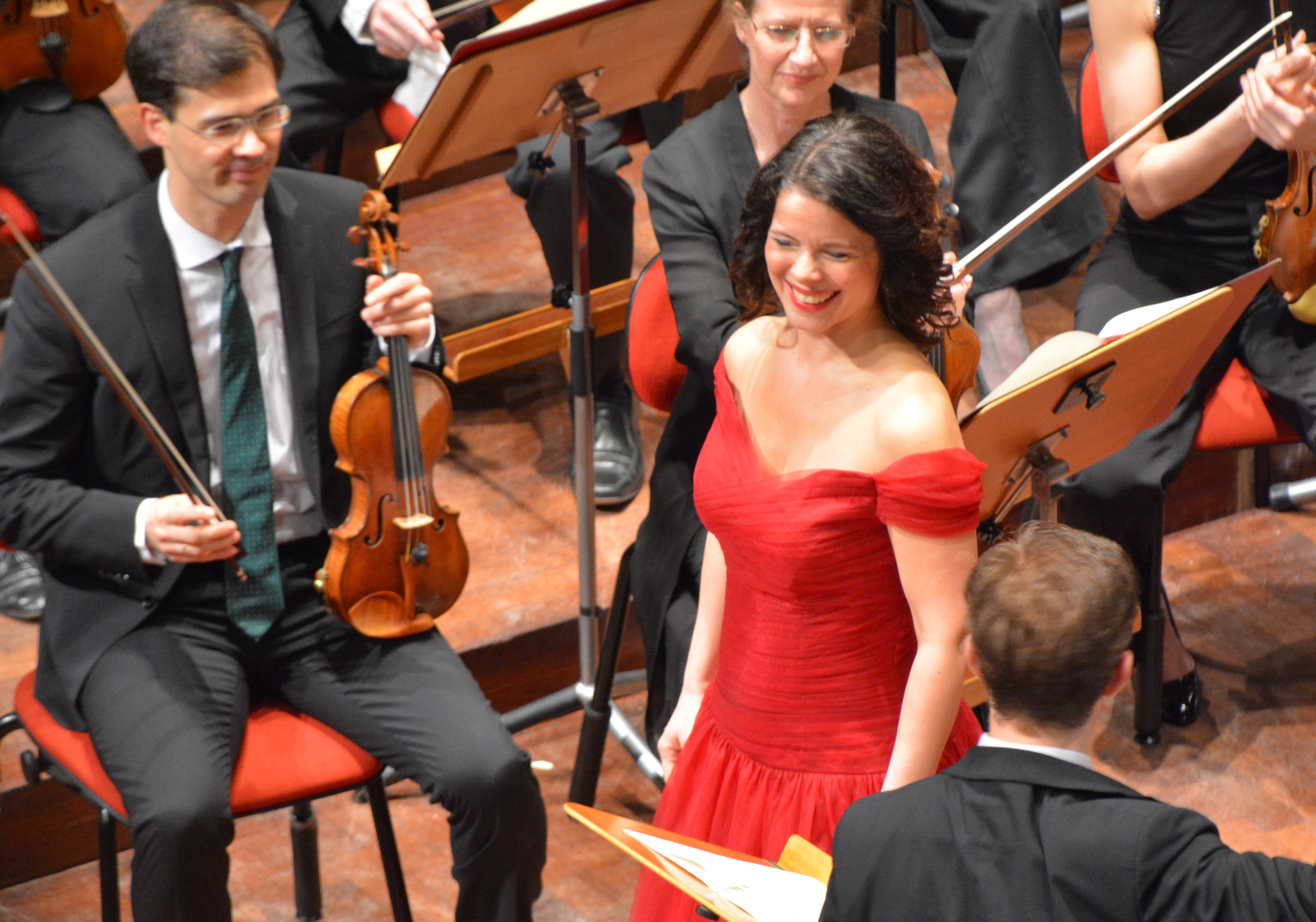
Katija Dragovejic, mezzosopran, at Berwaldhallen in Stockholm with Swedish Radio Symphony Orchestra, March 2016 at the first performance of Marie Samuelsson's Afrodite - Fragment av Sapfo.

Katija Dragojevic, born on 14 July 1970, is a Swedish operatic mezzo-soprano who is active at international opera houses such as La Scala, Royal Opera House Covent Garden and La Monnaie. Dragojevic starred in the film Juan based on Mozart's Don Giovanni.

== Career ==
Born in Stockholm, the young Dragojevic attended Adolf Fredrik's Music School there and sang in Adolf Fredrik's Girls Choir. She received her professional training at the college of music in Stockholm and at the Guildhall School of Music and Drama in London.

The debut took place in October 2000 as Kristina in Janáček's The Makropulos Affair at La Monnaie in Brussels. In 2012, she made her debut at La Scala in Milan as Cherubino in The Marriage of Figaro. At the Royal Swedish Opera, she has also sung Cherubino, a page in Salome and Meg Page in Verdi's Falstaff.

On the concert stage, Dragojevic has appeared with orchestras such as the Swedish Radio Symphony Orchestra, the Malmö Symphony Orchestra, the Gulbenkian Orchestra in Lisbon, the NDR Symphony Orchestra in Hamburg and the Bavarian Radio Symphony Orchestra in Munich in works like Bach's Magnificat, Mozart's C Minor Mass and Mahler's Des Knaben Wunderhorn. She has worked with conductors such as Ivor Bolton, Daniel Harding, Andris Nelsons, Thomas Hengelbrock, Manfred Honeck and Robin Ticciati.

Dragojevic was the soloist at the Nobel Prize Banquet in Stockholm in 2000. She appeared as Zerlina in Kasper Holten's 2010 film version of Mozart's Don Giovanni entitled Juan. She has recorded Michael Haydn's Missa Sancti Hieronymi and Timete Dominum for BIS Records.

== Discography ==
- Michael Haydn, Sacred Choral Music, 2000, BISCD859
- Vadstena Academy, Forty summers of opera, 4 CD:s, 2007, dB Productions #116

== Filmography ==
- Juan (2010)
