= Helena Charlotta Åkerhielm =

Swedish dramatist and translator

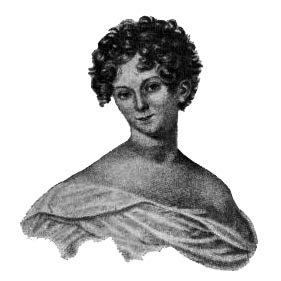
- Born: 1786
- Occupations: dramatist and translator

Helena Charlotta Åkerhielm (née af Ugglas; 1786 – 7 April 1828) was a Swedish dramatist and translator.

She was the daughter of count Samuel af Ugglas and Carolina Wittfoth and married baron Gustaf Fredrik Åkerhielm (1776–1853) in 1807.

Her spouse was director of the Royal Dramatic Theatre in 1818–23, and like him, she was genuinely interested in the dramatic art and active as a playwright and translator there. She co-wrote the tragedy Engelbrekt in collaboration with her spouse, which was staged at the Royal Dramatic theatre in 1820; the play was successful and was played at the theatre seventeen times until 1841. She also translated the plays Värdshuset, eller det lyckliga äventyret (1819), De begge svartsjuke (1820) and Maria Stuart (1820), all of them from French, which were all staged with good critique on the royal theatre.

She was the first woman to have her own play staged at the Royal Dramatic theatre, and together with Jeanette Granberg one of only two female playwrights to have their plays staged at the Royal Dramatic theatre before 1863.
