= Riltons Vänner =

Swedish professional a cappella group

Riltons Vänner (Rilton's Friends) is a Swedish professional a cappella group. The group was based in Stockholm and was formed in 1999. The band disbanded in July 2010 but reunited in May 2015.

The group has toured in Sweden as well as internationally.

== Members ==
- Linnéa Rilton (soprano)
- Matilda Lindell (soprano)
- Mia Greayer (alto)
- Daniel Greayer (baritone)
- Sebastian Rilton (bass)

=== Former members ===
- Ida Carnestedt
- Mathilda Lindgren (mezzo-soprano)

== Discography ==
- Kompis (2002)
- Kamrat (2003)
- Här är passion (2005)
- De vill att vi bugar och niger (2008)
- Japanmix (2009)
- Orkar, orkar inte (2019)

== Awards ==
- Winner, 2005 Best Folk/World Album of the Year, Contemporary A Cappella Society.
