= Carl Wilhelm Böttiger =

Swedish writer (1807–1878)

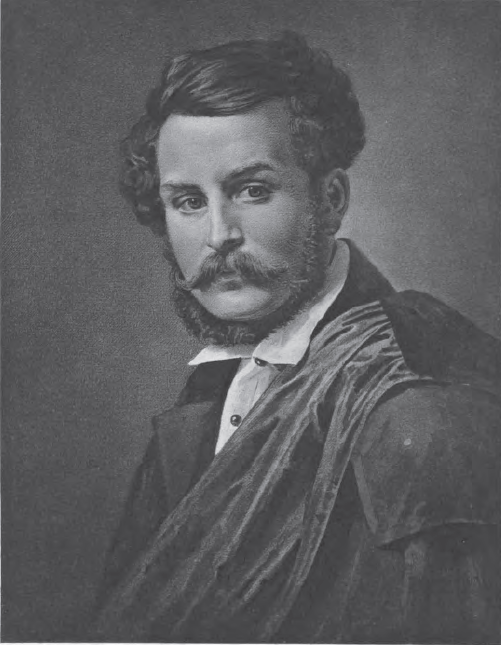
- Portrait by Olof Johan Södermark

Carl Wilhelm Böttiger (15 May 1807 – 22 December 1878) was a Swedish writer.

== Biography ==
He was born in Västerås, and studied at the University of Uppsala, where, after extensive travels, he was appointed professor of modern literature in 1845, and in 1858 professor of aesthetics, from which post he retired in 1867.

== Work ==
He was exceedingly active as translator, poet, dramatist, and literary critic. Most of his publications in the latter capacity appeared among the Transactions of the Swedish Academy. It is perhaps by his verse that he is best known. His publications include:

- Lyriska stycken (Lyrical Pieces, 1837–39)
- Religiösa sånger (Religious Songs, 1841)
- Torquato Tasso, Gerusalemme Liberata, Swedish translation (1842–51)
- Dante, Divina Commedia, Swedish translation (1846–51).
- a biography of his father-in-law, Esaias Tegnér

His Samlade Skrifter (Collected Works) appeared at Stockholm (6 vols., 1856–81).

Cultural offices
Preceded by Esaias Tegnér	Swedish Academy, Seat No.8; 1847-78	Succeeded by Carl David af Wirsén
