= Karl August Nicander =

Swedish lyric poet

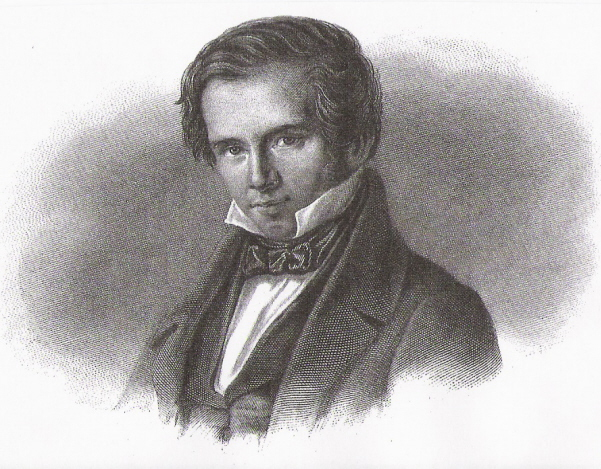
Karl August Nicander

Karl August Nicander (20 March 1799 — 7 February 1839) was a Swedish lyric poet.

== Bibliography ==
- Runesvärdet (1820)
- Fosterlandskänslan (1825)
- Dikter (1825)
- Dikter (1826)
- Markus Botzaris (1826)
- Tassos död (1826)
- Nya dikter (1827)
- Minnen från Södern (1831–1839)
- Hesperider (1838)
- Samlade dikter (1839–1841)
