= List of Swedish musicians =

This is a list of Swedish musicians and musical groups:

== Composers ==
=== A–M ===
- Johan Agrell (1701–1765), full name: Johan Joachim Agrell
- Hugo Alfvén (1872–1960), full name: Hugo Emil Alfvén
- Kurt Atterberg (1887–1974), full name: Kurt Magnus Atterberg
- Tor Aulin (1866–1914)
- Sven-Erik Bäck (1919–1994)
- Carl Michael Bellman (1740–1795)
- Berwald family
  - Franz Adolf Berwald (1796–1868), composer, musician and businessman; and the best-known of the musical Berwalds
  - Johan Fredrik Berwald (1787–1861), violinist, concert-master of the Swedish Royal Orchestra
  - Julie Berwald, actress and singer at the Royal Swedish Opera, later married to baron Knut Åkerhielm
  - Mathilda Berwald, née Cohn (married to Johan B.), singer to the Royal Court
- Ulf Björlin (1933–1993), conductor and composer
- Karl-Birger Blomdahl (1916–1968)
- Britta Byström (born 1977), classical composer for orchestra
- Düben family, originally musicians, who were raised to the nobility through the favour especially of king Charles XII of Sweden. Family members other than those mentioned below were important in civil service or made important contributions to other fields.
  - Gustaf Düben (1624–1690), organist of the German Church in Stockholm, Master of the Royal Swedish Court Orchestra, composer
- Lars Edlund (1922–2013)
- John Fernström (1897–1961), born in China of Swedish parents
- Gunnar de Frumerie (1908–1987)
- Harald Fryklöf (1882–1918)
- Ludwig Göransson, Academy-Award winning film score composer (born 1984)
- Thomas G:son (born 1968)
- Ebbe Grims-land (1915–2015)
- Jacob Adolf Hägg (1850–1928)
- Johann Christian Friedrich Hæffner (1759–1833), born in Germany
- Jan Johansson (1931–1968)
- Ulla Jones (born 1946)
- Edvin Kallstenius (1881–1967)
- Jacob Karlzon (born 1970)
- Joseph Martin Kraus (1756–1792)
- Lars-Erik Larsson (1908–1986)
- Lykke Li (born 1986)
- Ingvar Lidholm (1921–2017)
- Adolf Fredrik Lindblad (1801–1878)
- Otto Lindblad (1809–1864)
- Bo Linde (1933–1970)
- Loreen (born 1983), Eurovision winner
- Ralph Lundsten (1936–2023)
- Hildor Lundvik (1885–1951)
- Yngwie J. Malmsteen (born 1963), key figure in neoclassical metal, virtuoso guitarist, composer and multi-instrumentalist
- Rolf Martinsson (born 1956)
- Gertrud Maria Mell (1947–2016), organist, choir master and composer

=== N–Z ===
- Ludvig Norman (1831–1885), considered by some the outstanding Swedish composer between Franz Berwald and Wilhelm Stenhammar
- Gösta Nystroem (1890–1966)
- Wilhelm Peterson-Berger (1867–1942), full name: Olof Wilhelm Peterson-Berger
- Allan Pettersson (1911–1980), full name: Gustaf Allan Pettersson
- Ture Rangström (1884–1947)
- Benjamin Thage Dag Reichwald (born 1994)
- Johan Helmich Roman (1694–1758), called the "Swedish Handel"
- Hilding Rosenberg (1892–1985)
- Sven-David Sandström (1942–2019)
- Michael Saxell (born 1956)
- Fredrik Sixten (born 1962)
- Emil Sjögren (1853–1918), late romantic miniaturist
- August Söderman (1832–1876)
- Oscar Stembridge (born 2007)
- Wilhelm Stenhammar (1871–1927)
- Hilda Thegerström (1838–1907), pianist and composer
- Gunnar Wennerberg (1817–1901), uncle of Sara Wennerberg-Reuter
- Sara Wennerberg-Reuter (1875–1959)
- Johan Wikmanson (1753–1800)
- Dag Wirén (1905–1986)
- Ferdinand Zellbell the Younger (1719—1780)

== Conductors ==
- Ulf Björlin
- Herbert Blomstedt
- Sixten Ehrling
- Maria Eklund
- Eric Ericson
- Patrik Ringborg
- Niklas Willén

== Musical groups ==
=== 0–9 ===
- 59 Times The Pain

=== A–B ===
- ABBA
  - Stikkan Anderson (manager)
  - Benny Andersson
  - Agnetha Fältskog
  - Anni-Frid Lyngstad
  - Michael B. Tretow (engineer)
  - Björn Ulvaeus
- Ace of Base
  - Jenny Berggren
  - Jonas Berggren
  - Linn Berggren
  - Ulf Ekberg
- Acid House Kings
- Alcazar
  - Magnus Carlsson
  - Lina Hedlund
  - Andreas Lundstedt
  - Tess Merkel
- Alice in Videoland
- ALPHA 60
- Amaranthe
- Amon Amarth
- Änglagård
- Antiloop
- Arcana
- Arch Enemy
- The Ark
  - Ola Salo
- Armageddon
- Army of Lovers
  - Alexander Bard
  - Jean-Pierre Barda
  - Michaela Dornonville de la Cour
  - Camilla Henemark
  - Dominika Peczynski
- Ashbury Heights
- Astral Doors
- At the Gates
- A-Teens
  - Dhani Lennevald
  - Sara Lumholdt
  - Amit Sebastian Paul
  - Marie Serneholt
- Backyard Babies
- Basic Element
- Bathory
- Bjärv
- Blindside
  - Marcus Dahlström
  - Simon Grenehed
  - Christian Lindskog
  - Tomas Näslund
- Bloodbath
- Blue Swede
- Bo Kaspers Orkester
- Bob Hund
- Bodies Without Organs
- Brainpool
- Broder Daniel
- Bladee

=== C–D ===
- Caesars
- Callinaz
- Candlemass
- Caramba
- Caramell
- The Cardigans
  - Lars-Olof Johansson
  - Bengt Lagerberg
  - Nina Persson
  - Peter Svensson
  - Magnus Sveningsson
- Carnal Forge
- Charta 77
- Ceremonial Oath
- Clawfinger
- Club 8
- Clubland
- Coca Carola
- The Concretes
- Corroded
- Covenant
- Crashdïet
- Craft
- The Crown
- Crucified Barbara
- Cult of Luna
- Dark Funeral
- Dark Tranquillity
- Darkane
- David & the Citizens
- Dawn
- De Lyckliga Kompisarna
- Dead By April
- Deathstars
- Den Fule
  - Glenn Ljungström
  - Hans Nilsson
- Diablo Swing Orchestra
- Diabolical Masquerade
- Dimension Zero
- Dina Ögon
- Dismember
- Dissection
  - Tomas Asklund
  - Jon Nödtveidt
  - Set Teitan
- Division of Laura Lee
- Doktor Kosmos
- Dozer
- Draconian
- Dragonland
- Dream Evil
  - Fredrik Nordström
- Drömhus
- Dungen
- Dynazty
- Drain Gang

=== E–G ===
- Ebba Grön
- Ecco2k
- Edge of Sanity
- Ef
- Eldkvarn
- Elliphant
- Engel
- Entombed
- Eskobar
- Europe
  - Ian Haugland
  - John Levén
  - Kee Marcello
  - Mic Michaeli
  - John Norum
  - Tony Reno
  - Joey Tempest
- Evergrey
- The Fallen Empires
- First Aid Kit
- The Flower Kings
- FO&O
  - Oscar Enestad
  - Oscar Molander
  - Omar Rudberg
  - Felix Sandman
- Freak Kitchen
- Galantis
- Gardenian
- Garmarna
- Gemini
- Gert Jonnys
- Ghost
  - Tobias Forge
- Goat
- Graveyard
- Gravitonas
  - Alexander Bard
- Günther and the Sunshine Girls
- Gyllene Tider

=== H–K ===
- H.E.A.T
- HammerFall
- Hardcore Superstar
- The Haunted
- Headplate
  - Anders Björler
  - Jonas Björler
  - Peter Dolving
  - Patrik Jensen
  - Per Möller Jensen
- Hedningarna
  - Hållbus Totte Mattson
  - Anders Norudde
  - Magnus Stinnerbom
- The Hellacopters
  - Nicke Andersson
  - Robert Dahlqvist
  - Kenny Håkansson
  - Matz Robert Eriksson
  - Anders "Boba Fett" Lindström
- Hello Saferide
- The Hep Stars
  - Benny Andersson
- The Hives
  - Howlin' Pelle Almqvist
  - Nicholaus Arson
  - Chris Dangerous
  - Vigilante Carlstroem
  - Dr. Matt Destruction
- Honey Is Cool
- Hoola Bandoola Band
- The Hootenanny Singers
- Hoven Droven
- Hypocrisy
- iamamiwhoami
  - Jonna Lee
- Icona Pop
  - Caroline Hjelt
  - Aino Jawo
- IFA Wartburg
- I'm from Barcelona
  - Emanuel Lundgren
- Imminence
- Imperiet
  - Joakim Thåström
- In Flames
  - Anders Fridén
  - Björn Gelotte
  - Peter Iwers
  - Johan Larsson
  - Jesper Strömblad
  - Daniel Svensson
- The (International) Noise Conspiracy
- Jack Baymoore & the Bandits
- J.E.M
- Jens Lekman
- Johnossi
- Just D
- Kaipa
- Katatonia
- Kent
  - Joakim Berg
  - Sami Sirviö
- Khoma
- Kill Squad vs. Doubleheader
- Kite
- The Knife
- Komeda
- Koop

=== L–O ===
- Last Amanda
- Leather Nun
  - Freddie Wadling
- The Legends
- LeGrand
- Lili & Susie
  - Lili Päivärinta
  - Susie Päivärinta
- Little Dragon
- LOK
- Lord Belial
- Love Is All
- Lowe
- Machinae Supremacy
- Makthaverskan
- Mando Diao
- Marduk
- The Mary Onettes
- Mayhem's 1988–1991 singer Per Yngve Ohlin, also known as "Dead", also member of Swedish band Morbid
- Melody Club
- Meshuggah
  - Tomas Haake
  - Mårten Hagström
  - Jens Kidman
  - Dick Lövgren
  - Fredrik Thordendal
- Miike Snow
- Millencolin
  - Mathias Färm
  - Erik Ohlsson
  - Nikola Šarčević
  - Fredrik Larzon
- Moneybrother
- Monster
- Moonlight Agony
- Movits!
- Mustasch
- My heart is a metronome
- Månegarm
- Naglfar
- Nasum
- Nationalteatern
  - Ulf Dageby
  - Totta Näslund
- NEXX
- Nightingale
- Nightrage
- Ninedee
- No Fun at All
- Nocturnal Rites
- The Nomads
- October Tide
- Oh Laura
- Onkel Kånkel
- Opeth
  - Mikael Åkerfeldt
  - Martin Axenrot
  - Peter Lindgren
  - Martin Mendez
  - Per Wiberg
- Orsa Spelmän

=== P–S ===
- Pain
- Pain of Salvation
- Pan.Thy.Monium
- Passenger
- Peace Love & Pitbulls
- Peter Bjorn and John
- Play
  - Faye Hamlin
  - Anaïs Lameche
  - Janet Leon
  - Rosie Munter
  - Anna Sundstrand
- The Poodles
- Radio Dept.
- Raised Fist
- Razorlight
- Rednex
- Reeperbahn
  - Olle Ljungström
- Refused
- Ribspreader
- Roxette
  - Marie Fredriksson
  - Per Gessle
- Sabaton
- Sahara Hotnights
- Sambassadeur
- Sandy Mouche
  - Christian Älvestam (former member)
  - Helena Josefsson
  - Jonas Kjellgren
- Scar Symmetry
- Secret Service
- Shivering Spines
- Shout Out Louds
- Silent Border
- Skwisgaar Skwigelf (lead guitarist of Dethklok)
- Slagsmålsklubben
- Soilwork
  - Björn Strid
  - Peter Wichers
- Solution .45
- Sonic Syndicate
- The Sounds
  - Maja Ivarsson
- The Soundtrack of Our Lives
- The Spotnicks
- Steel
- Suburban Kids with Biblical Names
- Sugarplum Fairy
- Svartsyn
- Swedish House Mafia
  - Steve Angello
  - Axwell
  - Sebastian Ingrosso

=== T–Z ===
- Tad Morose
- The Tages
- Taken By Trees
- Tallest Man on Earth
- Teddybears sthlm
  - Joakim Åhlund
  - Klas Åhlund
- Terror 2000
- Therion
  - List of Therion members
- Thermostatic
- This Ending
- This Perfect Day
- Those Dancing Days
- Thyrfing
- Tiamat
- Tiger Lou
- The Tough Alliance
- Triakel
  - Emma Härdelin
- Truckfighters
- Tråd
- Unleashed
- Vacuum
  - Alexander Bard (former member)
  - Mattias Lindblom
  - Marina Schiptjenko (former member)
  - Anders Wollbeck
- Van
- Vintersorg
  - Andreas "Vintersorg" Hedlund
  - Mattias Marklund
- Violent Silence
- The Wannadies
- Whale
- Whipped Cream
- Zeigeist

== Musicians ==
- Mikael Åkerfeldt
- Christian Älvestam
- Christopher Amott
- Daniel Antonsson
- Martin Axenrot
- Anders Björler
- Jonas Björler
- Nalle Colt
- Fredy Clue
- Peter Dolving
- Niclas Engelin
- Per Eriksson
- Adrian Erlandsson
- Daniel Erlandsson
- Anders Fridén
- Björn Gelotte
- Martin Henriksson
- Peter Iwers
- Fredrik Johansson
- Jonas Kjellgren
- Jacob Karlzon
- Anna Lang
- Ingrid Lang-Fagerström
- Johan Larsson
- Martin Larsson
- Jonna Lee
- Johan Liiva
- Tomas Lindberg
- Glenn Ljungström
- Martin Lopez
- Christofer Malmström
- Kee Marcello
- Lisa Miskovsky
- Anders Nyström
- Jonas Renkse
- Speed
- Mikael Stanne
- Jesper Strömblad
- Niklas Sundin
- Alf Svensson
- Daniel Svensson
- Dan Swanö
- Peter Tägtgren
- Peter Wichers
- Peter Wildoer
- Quorthon
- Weatherday

== Singers ==
=== Opera singers ===
List of Swedish operatic sopranos

- Anna Bartels (1869–1950), soprano
- Davida Afzelius-Bohlin (1866–1955), mezzo-soprano
- Adèle Almati (1861–1919), mezzo-soprano
- Ruth Althén (1980–1985), soprano
- Vendela Andersson-Sörensen (1860–1926), soprano
- Lovisa Augusti
- Irma Björck (1898–1993), mezzo-soprano
- Jussi Björling
- Sophie Cysch (1847–1917), mezzo-soprano
- Mathilda Ebeling (1826–1851), soprano
- Mathilda Enequist
- Malena Ernman
- Wilhelmina Fundin (1819–1911), soprano
- Nicolai Gedda
- Maria Gelhaar (1858–1920), soprano
- Wilhelmina Gelhaar (1837–1923), soprano
- Håkan Hagegård
- Josef Herou
- Davida Hesse-Lilienberg (1877–1964), soprano
- Thekla Hofer (1852–1938), soprano
- Agnes Janson (1861–1947), mezzo-soprano
- Liva Järnefelt (1876–1971), mezzo-soprano
- Helena Jungwirth (1945–2023), mezzo-soprano
- Anna Maria Klemming (1864–1889), soprano
- Jan Kyhle
- Karin Langebo (1927–2019), soprano
- Anna Larsson
- Jenny Lind
- Paula Lizell (1873–1962), soprano
- Ida Lövgren (c. 1850), dramatic soprano
- Magna Lykseth-Skogman (1874–1949), soprano
- Kerstin Meyer (1928–2020), mezzo-soprano
- Louise Michaëli
- Birgit Nilsson
- Christina Nilsson
- Henriette Nissen-Saloman
- Augusta Öhrström-Renard (1856–1921), mezzo-soprano
- Elisabeth Olin
- Signe Rappe-Welden (1879–1974), soprano
- Margit Rosengren (1901–1952), soprano
- Margareta Sjöstedt (1923–2012), contralto
- Anne Sofie von Otter
- Anna Sofia Sevelin
- Elisabeth Söderström
- Nina Stemme
- Fredrika Stenhammar
- Wilhelmina Strandberg (1845–1914), mezzo-soprano
- Iréne Theorin
- Astrid Varnay,
- Elisabeth Wärnfeldt
- Lilly Walleni (1875–1920), mezzo-soprano
- Zulamith Wellander (1857–1919), mezzo-soprano
- Henriette Widerberg
- Carolina Östberg

=== Popular music singers ===
==== A–M ====
- Tommy Genesis, half Swedish
- Salem Al Fakir
- Felix Kjellberg (PewDiePie)
- Joel Alme
- Joel Berghult (RoomieOfficial)
- Alice Babs
- Basshunter
- Bell
- Robin Bengtsson
- Linda Bengtzing
- Lars Berghagen
- Marit Bergman
- Bertil Boo
- Bosson
- Jay-Jay Johanson
- Joachim Cans
- Pelle Carlberg
- Agnes Carlsson
- Eagle-Eye Cherry
- Neneh Cherry
- Shirley Clamp
- Kikki Danielsson
- Darin
- Per Yngve Ohlin
- Stefan Demert
- Doris
- Dr. Alban
- Lotta Engberg
- Martin "E-Type" Eriksson
- Marie Fredriksson
- Per Gessle
- José González
- Nanne Grönvall
- Carola Häggkvist
- Håkan Hellström
- Kjell Höglund
- Patrik Isaksson
- Emil Jensen
- Amanda Jenssen
- Andreas Johnson
- Ana Johnsson
- Helena Josefsson
- Tommy Körberg
- Laleh
- Zara Larsson
- Tomas Ledin
- Leila K.
- Jens Lekman
- Lykke Li
- Lill Lindfors
- Tove Lo
- Olivia Lobato
- Ulf Lundell
- Lars Lönndahl
- Veronica Maggio
- Amanda Mair
- Siw Malmkvist
- Meja
- Andreas Moe
- John Martin

==== N–Z ====
- SHY Martin
- Sanna Nielsen
- Stina Nordenstam
- Tone Norum
- Elena Paparizou
- Charlotte Perrelli
- Ulla Persson
- Lena Philipsson
- Povel Ramel
- Bo Johan Renck
- Robin Carlsson (Robyn)
- Eric Saade
- Danny Saucedo
- Michael Saxell
- September
- Seinabo Sey
- Martin Stenmarck
- Tove Styrke
- Emil Svanängen (Loney, Dear)
- Barbro "Lill-Babs" Svensson
- Loreen Talhaoui
- Joey Tempest
- Titiyo
- Viktoria Tolstoy
- Magnus Uggla
- Cornelis Vreeswijk
- Yung Lean/jonatan leandoer96
- Pernilla Wahlgren
- Jenny Wilson
- Lars Winnerbäck
- Sophie Zelmani
- Måns Zelmerlöw
- Zikai
- Maher Zain
- Zara Larsson

== Others ==
- NOTD
- Björn Afzelius
- Airbase
- Alesso
- Marten Andersson
- Avicii
- Robert Bennesh
- Anna Bergström-Simonsson (1853–1937), voice teacher
- John Dahlbäck
- Mikkey Dee (drummer of Motörhead)
- Arne Domnerus
- Lisa Ekdahl
- Jörgen Elofsson
- Rolf Ericson
- Bengt Forsberg
- Gula gubben
- Bo Hansson
- Jakob Hellman
- Jonny Jakobsen
- Åsa Jinder
- Jens Johansson
- Peter Jöback
- Nils Landgren
- Christian Lindberg
- Björn J:son Lindh
- Yngwie J. Malmsteen
- Max Martin
- Eddie Meduza
- Totta Näslund
- Lisa Nilsson
- Myrra Malmberg
- Stefan Olsdal
- Åke Persson
- Denniz Pop
- Eric Prydz
- Roland Pöntinen
- Ilya Salmanzadeh
- Björn Skifs
- Stonebridge
- Niklas Strömstedt
- Molly Sanden
- Evert Taube
- Joakim Thåström
- Monica Törnell
- Rebecka Törnqvist
- Cecilia Vennersten
- Monica Zetterlund

== See also ==
- Popular music in Sweden
- Lists of composers
- Music of Sweden
- Swedish hip hop
- Royal Swedish Academy of Music
