= Berwald =

Berwald is a surname. Notable people with the surname include:

- Franz Berwald (1796–1868), Swedish Romantic composer
- Johan Fredrik Berwald (1787–1861), Swedish violinist, conductor and composer
- Juli Berwald, American biologist and writer
- Julie Berwald (1822–1877), Swedish concert and opera singer
- Lance Berwald (born 1961), American basketball player
- Mathilda Berwald (1798–1877), Finnish/Swedish concert singer
- William Berwald (1864–1948), American composer and conductor

== See also ==
- 10380 Berwald, main-belt asteroid
- Bärwald
- Bärwalde
- Baerwald
