= 1920 in Nordic music =

The following is a list of notable events and compositions of the year 1920 in Nordic music.

== Events ==
- 16 February – Composer Jean Sibelius spends an evening celebrating along with the poet Eino Leino, musicians Robert Kajanus, Eero Järnefelt, artist Pekka Halonen and other members of the Kalevala Society. In the course of the evening, Sibelius quarrels with Leino.
- 8 December – On his birthday, Jean Sibelius is presented with 63,000 marks, raised by the tenor Wäinö Sola to honour the composer and help pay his debts.

== New works ==
- Hugo Alfvén – Min födelsedag
- Viking Dahl – Maison de Fous (ballet)
- Johan Halvorsen – Norwegian Rhapsody No. 2
- Oskar Merikanto – Regina von Emmeritz (opera)
- Carl Nielsen – Moderen (incidental music)
- Jean Sibelius – Hymn of the Earth
- Rued Langgaard – Symphony No. 6 "The Heaven-rending".

== Popular music ==
- Ellen Heijkorn – "Julvisa (Nu så kommer julen...)"; text by Zacharias Topelius
- Carl Nielsen & Helge Rode – "Min pige er så lys som rav"

== Births ==
- 11 January – Ole Henrik Moe, Norwegian pianist, art historian, and critic (died 2013)
- 2 February – Heikki Suolahti, Finnish composer (died 1936)
- 15 February – Rolf Andersen, Norwegian trumpeter, orchestra conductor, and bandleader (died 2016)
- 16 February — Karsten Andersen, Norwegian conductor (died 1997).
- 27 March – Carl-Henrik Norin, Swedish saxophonist (died 1967)
- 3 August – Jonas Brunvoll Jr., Norwegian opera singer and actor (died 1982)
- 7 August – Harry Arnold, Swedish jazz saxophonist and bandleader (died 1971)
- 28 August – Rowland Greenberg, Norwegian trumpeter, vocalist, and bandleader (died 1994).
- 7 September – Hans Leygraf, Swedish pianist, conductor and composer (died 2011)
- 4 October – Charlie Norman, Swedish jazz pianist and entertainer (died 2005)

== Deaths ==
- 16 April – Conrad Nordqvist, Swedish composer (born 1840)
- 14 May – Lilly Walleni, Swedish operatic mezzo-soprano (born 1875)
- 10 August – Clara Lachmann, Danish-Swedish patron of the arts (born 1864)
- 31 October – Joachim Neergaard, Danish composer (born 1858)
- unknown date – Maria Gelhaar, Swedish operatic soprano (born 1877)

== See also ==
- 1920 in Denmark
- 1920 in Iceland
- 1920 in Norwegian music
- 1920 in Sweden
