= Suolahti (disambiguation) =

Suolahti may refer to:

== Places ==
- Suolahti, former town and municipality of Finland

== People ==
- Jaakko Suolahti (1918 – 1987), Finnish historian
- Heikki Suolahti (1920 – 1936), Finnish composer
- Hugo Suolahti (1874 - 1944), Finnish politician, linguist and philologist
