= 1971 in Nordic music =

The following is a list of notable events and releases that happened in Scandinavian music in 1971.

== Events ==
- 3 April – The 16th Eurovision Song Contest is held in Dublin, and is won by Monaco. Of the Scandinavian entries, Sweden finishes 6th, Finland 8th and Norway 17th.
- 2 December – The Finlandia Hall in Helsinki is inaugurated with a concert of Finnish music, featuring the premiè of Einojuhani Rautavaara's Meren tytär ('Daughter of the Sea') and Aulis Sallinen's First Symphony (opus 24), as well as Sibelius's violin concerto, with Isaac Stern as soloist and the Helsinki Philharmonic Orchestra.
- 5 September – The Kalvøyafestivalen, a music festival in Norway, is held for the first time. Performers include Lillebjørn Nilsen and Ole Paus.

== New works ==
- Jørgen Jersild – Three Danish Romances
- Sven-Eric Johanson – Pastorale
- Harald Sæverud – Mozart-Motto Sinfonietta (1971)
- Aulis Sallinen – Symphony No. 1

== Popular music ==
- Familien Andersen – "Jeg har set en rigtig negermand" (#1 Denmark)
- Gitte Hænning – "Flirt (Samme sted, samme tid)" (#1 Denmark)
- Anita Hegerland & Roy Black – "Schön ist es auf der Welt zu sein" (#1 Denmark; #3 Norway)
- Hootenanny Singers – "Aldrig Mer"

== Recordings ==
- Fred Åkerström – Mera Ruben Nilson
- Gunder Hägg – Glassfabriken
- Anni-Frid Lyngstad – Frida
- Trúbrot – Lifun

== Eurovision Song Contest ==
- Finland in the Eurovision Song Contest 1971
- Norway in the Eurovision Song Contest 1971
- Sweden in the Eurovision Song Contest 1971

== Film and television music ==
- Sven Gyldmark Guld til præriens skrappe drenge

== Musical films ==
- The Apple War, with music by Evert Taube

== Births ==
- 3 February – Christian Liljegren, Swedish singer-songwriter
- 1 December – Mika Pohjola, Finnish jazz pianist and composer

== Deaths ==
- 11 February – Harry Arnold, Swedish saxophonist and bandleader (born 1920)
- 22 May – Frank Ottersen, Norwegian jazz musician (born 1921)

== See also ==
- 1971 in Denmark
- 1971 in Iceland
- 1971 in Norwegian music
- 1971 in Sweden
