= Augusta Öhrström-Renard =

Swedish operatic mezzosoprano

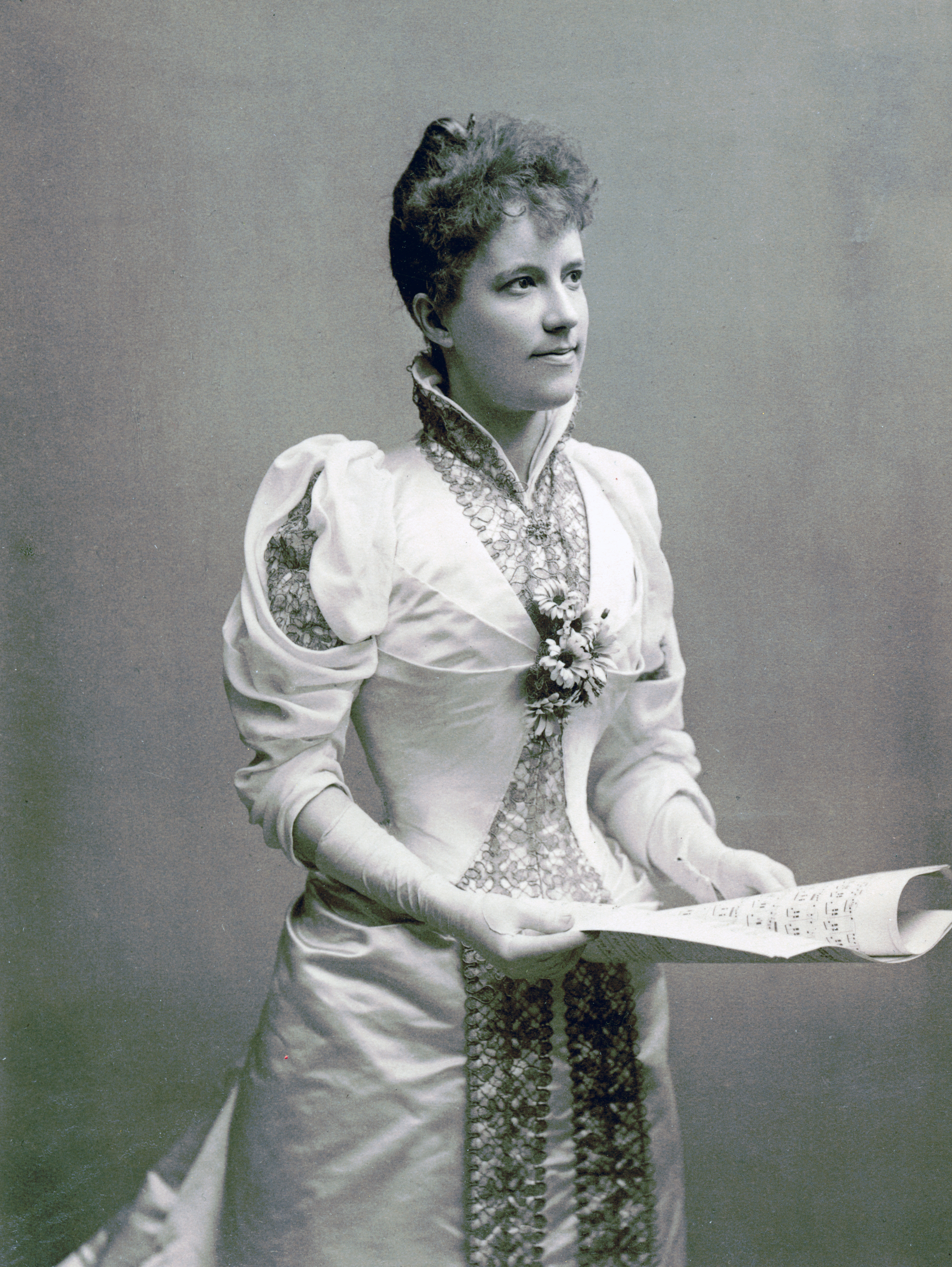
Augusta Öhrström (1883)

Augusta Öhrström-Renard (16 February 1856 – 4 November 1921) was a Swedish mezzo-soprano opera singer who performed at the Royal Theatre in Stockholm (1881–1883) and gave concerts in France and North America. Her operatic roles included Azucena in Il trovatore, Bergadrottningen in Den bergtagna and Marta in the Swedish première of Mefistofele in 1883. From 1897 she lived in New York where she was engaged by the Metropolitan Opera for a five-year period.

== Biography ==
Born in Gothenburg on 16 February 1856, Augusta Öhrström was musically talented from an early age, playing both the piano and the violin and performing when she was only 11. Her parents therefore sent her to study music in Stockholm under Fredrika Stenhammar and Wilhelmina Strandberg when she was 15. She first sang at a Gothenburg concert when she was 17. After an engagement at the Royal Opera from 1881 to 1883, she moved to Paris where she met the foremost operatic composers of the day, including Gounod, Jules Massenet and Charles-Marie Widor. She spent four years in Paris where she frequently sang in salons and public concerts. In 1888, she participated in the music festival in Copenhagen.

Öhrström then went on tour in North America where she gained a reputation as an international star, performing no less than 126 times in Canada, Mexico and the United States in cities including Boston, Philadelphia, Quebec, Montreal, New Orleans and Washington. Wherever she went, she was enthusiastically acclaimed by both her audiences and the press. She then returned to Sweden in 1990, giving concerts in various venues in the south of the country.

From 1897 she lived in New York where she was engaged by the Metropolitan Opera for a five-year period. In 1903 she married the impresario Fred O. Renard. Augusta Öhrström-Renard died in New York City on 4 November 1921.
