= New Tide Orquesta =

Swedish chamber music group

- Origin: Stockholm and Gothenburg, Sweden
- Genres: nuevo tango minimalism chamber music improvisation post minimalism contemporary classical music
- Years active: 1996-present
- Labels: Imogena; MNW/Xource; Laika Records; Hoob Records
- Members: Per Störby; Livet Nord; Thomas Gustavsson; Josef Kallerdahl; Johanna Dahl
- Website: www.newtideorquesta.com

New Tide Orquesta is a Swedish chamber music group based in Stockholm. The group, consisting of Per Störby, Livet Nord, Thomas Gustavsson, Josef Kallerdahl and Johanna Dahl, was known from 1996 to 2012 as New Tango Orquesta.

Their music have been used in several movies, including the award-winning Searching for Sugar Man, and as the musical score to several theatre plays, dance performances and art installations.

The band have toured and performed at concert halls, festivals, clubs and music stages in Russia, Brazil, USA, Ukraine, China, Turkey, Germany, England, Ireland, Argentina, Uruguay, Luxembourg, Denmark, Norway among others.

== Lineup ==
- Per Störby, composer, bandoneon
- Livet Nord, violin
- Thomas Gustavsson, piano
- Josef Kallerdahl, double bass
- Johanna Dahl, cello

The artistic director of the group, composer Per Störby, is known for electro acts such as Zeigeist and Pearl Fiction. New Tide's music is a unique mix of baroque music, nuevo tango, free improvisation, minimalism, post minimalism and contemporary classical music. They are known for their special sound with much dynamism. In 2010, they were awarded "Group Of The Year" in the Swedish folk and world music gala.

The "New Tide Orquesta" name was first introduced in the music documentary/concert "New Tide Orquesta - The River Session", produced by Fredrik Egerstrand and Kalle Gustafsson Jerneholm for broadcast on Swedish national television (SVT) in 2012. The word "tango" was replaced with "tide" because the group felt that they had "grown out of the tango suit" and needed to develop their music without boundaries and obligations.

== Discography ==
They have released eight albums. Five as New Tango Orquesta (1998-2012) and three as New Tide Orquesta (2012-):

- 1998 The New Tango Orquesta
- 2000 Part II
- 2005 Bestiario
- 2009 The Kiev Concert
- 2009 Vesper
- 2012 How To Climb A Mountain
- 2016 Live In Rio
- 2016 Spirits: Nursery Rhymes

The third album "Bestiario" was nominated for a Swedish Grammy award in 2005. The fourth album was recorded in the beautiful October Palace in Kyiv, Ukraine in 2008. Their fifth album "Vesper" won an award for "experimental of the year" in the Swedish Manifest gala in 2011.

In 2011, they released the book "Full Scores/Photos/Text" with the complete full scores for "Vesper", text by the Swedish dramatist Mattias Brunn, art front cover by the Swedish artist Ernst Billgren and collected photos from the band's tours and performances. A sixth album "How To Climb A Mountain", their first album under the name "New Tide Orquesta", was released October 24, 2012 on HOOB Records.

== Bibliography ==
- 2011 Full Scores/Photos/Text
