= Fallen Empire =

Fallen Empire or Fallen Empires may refer to:

== Film ==
- Fallen Empire (film), 2012 film by Alejo Mo-Sun

== Games ==
- Fallen Empires (Magic: The Gathering), a Magic: The Gathering expansion set
- Fallen Empire, renamed Legions: Overdrive, a 2010 computer game

== Music ==
- Fallen Empires (album), a 2011 album by Snow Patrol, or the title song
  - Fallen Empires Tour
- The Fallen Empire, a 2006 album by Altaria
- The Fallen Empires, Swedish band
- Fallen Empires, a 2010 album by Our Last Enemy
- Fallen Empires, a 2015 album by Diviner
