= 1994 in Nordic music =

The following is a list of notable events and releases that happened in Nordic music in 1994.

== Events ==
- 30 April – The 39th Eurovision Song Contest takes place in Dublin. The best-performing Scandinavian country is Norway, which finishes in 6th place. Iceland is 12th, Sweden is 13th, and Finland finishes 22nd.
- 9–13 May – The 40th International Rostrum of Composers takes place. For the third time in a row a Finnish composer wins the senior category (Eero Hämeenniemi with Nattuvannar) Mogens Christensen of Norway and Jouni Kaipainen of Finland are also recommended.
- 16 May – Norwegian musician Varg Vikernes is sentenced at Eidsivating Court to 21 years of prison for murder and arson.
- 30 July – The Verbier Festival is launched by Martin Engstrom.
- unknown date – Swedish dansband Anders Engbergs is re-established when Lotta Engbergs leaves Lotta & Anders Engbergs orkester following the couple's divorce.

== Classical works ==
- Vagn Holmboe – Symphony No. 13, M.362
- Magnus Lindberg – Piano Concerto No. 1
- Frederik Magle – Concerto for organ and orchestra, "The Infinite Second"
- Einojuhani Rautavaara
  - The Gift of the Magi (opera)
  - Symphony No. 7, "Angel of Light"

== Film and TV scores ==
- Jaakko Erkkilä & Pekka Karjalainen – Aapo
- Søren Rasted and Claus Norreen – Frække Frida og de frygtløse spioner

== Musical films ==
- Min fynske barndom, biopic of composer Carl Nielsen
- Total Balalaika Show, featuring a 1993 concert by the Leningrad Cowboys in Helsinki

== Hit singles ==
- Ace of Base – "Don't Turn Around" (#3 Finland; #4 Denmark; #5 UK; #10 Iceland)
- Army of Lovers – "Lit de Parade" (#13 Sweden)
- Glenmark Eriksson Strömstedt (GES) – "När vi gräver guld i USA" (#1 Sweden)
- Sissel Kyrkjebø – "Se ilden lyse (Fire in Your Heart)" (#1 Norway; #9 Sweden)
- Klamydia – "Huipulla tuulee" (#1 Finland)
- Rednex – "Cotton Eye Joe"(#1 Sweden, Austria, Belgium, Finland, Germany, Netherlands, Norway, Spain, UK)
- Taikapeili – "Jos sulla on toinen" (#1 Finland)
- Whigfield – "Saturday Night" (#1 UK, etc.)

== Eurovision Song Contest ==
- Finland in the Eurovision Song Contest 1994
- Iceland in the Eurovision Song Contest 1994
- Norway in the Eurovision Song Contest 1994
- Sweden in the Eurovision Song Contest 1994

== Births ==
- 11 May – Guro Kleven Hagen, Norwegian violinist

== Deaths ==
- 10 January – Sven-Erik Bäck, Swedish composer (born 1919)
- 18 January – Torbjörn Hultcrantz, Swedish jazz bassist (born 1937)
- 30 January – Finn Arnestad, Norwegian composer (born 1915)
- 2 April – Rowland Greenberg, Norwegian jazz trumpeter (born 1920)
- 18 May – Hans Stenseth, Norwegian flautist (born 1896)
- 23 May – George de Godzinsky, Finnish pianist, conductor and composer (born 1914)
- 13 July – Eddie Boyd, African-American blues musician based in Finland (born 1914)
- 18 August – Charles Redland, Swedish jazz saxophonist, bandleader, and composer (born 1911)
- 9 September – Soffi Schønning, Norwegian opera singer (born 1894)
- 21 October – Thore Ehrling, Swedish jazz trumpeter, bandleader and composer (born 1912)
- 31 October – Erling Stordahl, Norwegian singer and farmer (born 1923)
- 27 November – Toralf Tollefsen, Norwegian accordionist (born 1914)
