= Elfrida Andrée =

Swedish organist, composer and conductor (1841–1929)

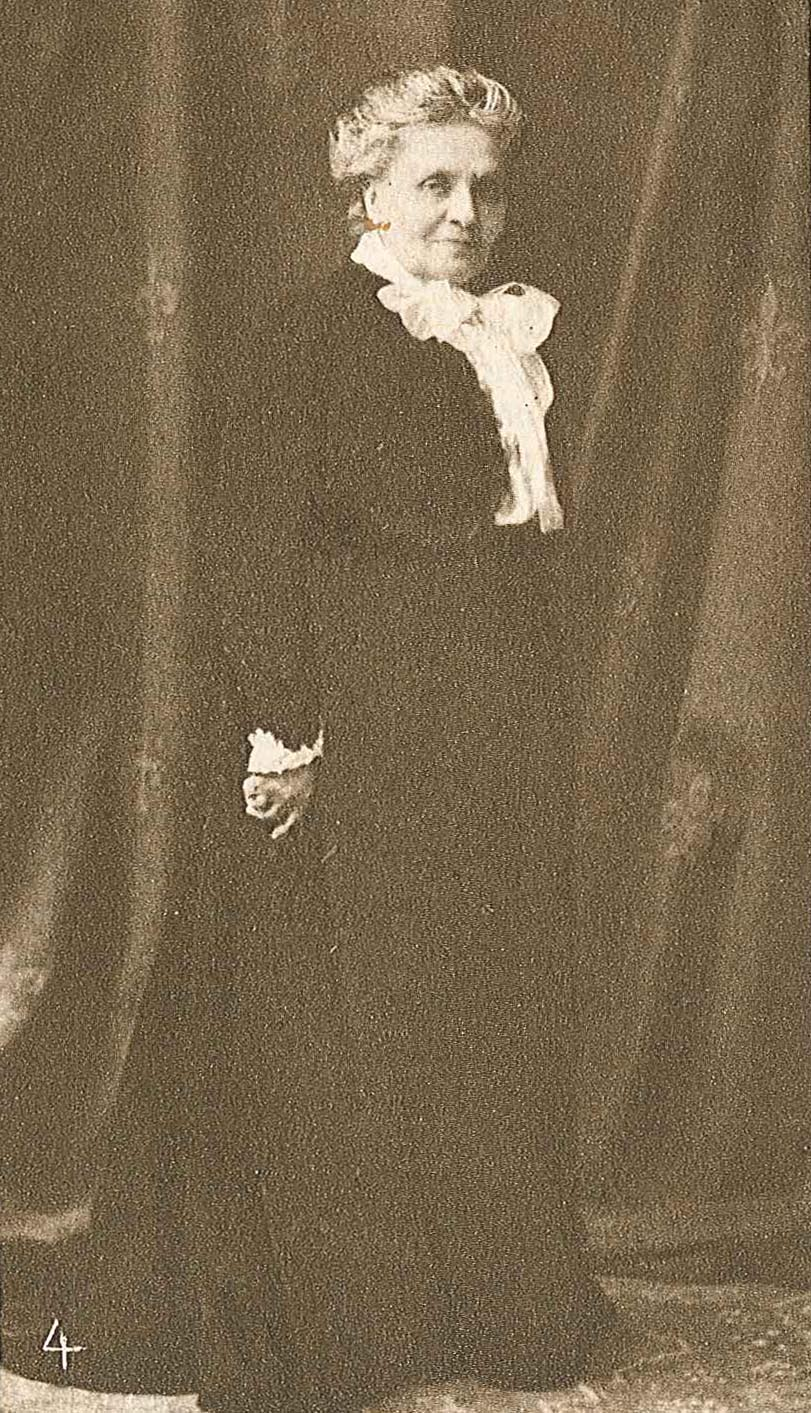
Andrée before 1916

Elfrida Andrée (19 February 1841 – 11 January 1929) was a Swedish organist, composer, and conductor. Her sister was the singer Fredrika Stenhammar.

== Life and career ==
=== Early life and education ===
Andrée was born on 19 February 1841 in Visby to the doctor Andreas Andrée and Lovisa Lyth, both of whom were actively involved in musical pursuits. Luckily for Elfrida, Andreas believed in education for all his children, not just his sons. Both she and her older sister, Fredrika, received excellent instruction, especially in music. When she was fourteen, she enrolled at the Conservatory in Stockholm, where she studied both organ and composition. She was the pupil of Ludvig Norman and Niels Wilhelm Gade, and was the first woman to pass organ examinations in Sweden.

=== Activism ===
In Sweden at the time Andrée was ready to begin her career, unmarried women over the age of twenty-five were barred from holding permanent positions as church organists. Both Elfrida and her father repeatedly lobbied the Swedish parliament to change the law, and eventually succeeded in 1861. An activist in the Swedish women's movement, she was one of the first female organists to be officially appointed in Scandinavia.

=== Career ===
Andrée began work in Stockholm in 1861 and became the organist at Gothenburg Cathedral in 1867, where she remained the organist until her death. In 1897 she was named leader of the Gothenburg Workers Institute Concerts, establishing her reputation as the first Swedish woman to conduct a symphony orchestra. Reportedly, she fainted upon hearing the news of her appointment. For her services, she was elected to the Royal Swedish Academy of Music. She died in Gothenburg. During her career, she won the Litteris et Artibus award in 1895, as well as the Idun "Women's Academy" Fellowship in 1908.

=== Compositions ===
Andrée wrote two organ symphonies, No. 1 in B minor and No. 2 in E-flat major that are still being played today, in addition to an Andante in G major and a Larghetto in C minor. Her other compositions include the opera Fritiofs saga (1899, libretto by Selma Lagerlöf), several works for orchestra including two symphonies, a piano quartet in A minor (1870) and a piano quintet in E minor (published in 1865), a piano trio in G minor (1887) (and another published posthumously in C minor), a string quartet in D minor from 1861 and another in A major, pieces for violin (including sonatas in E flat and B flat major) and for piano, two Swedish masses, an 1879 choral ballade "Snöfrid", and lieder. The composer was rediscovered in the 1980s by the Swedish musicologist Eva Öhrström.

== Recordings ==
A 1996 recording on the Caprice label features Andrée's piano quintet, along with a piano sonata, the string quartet in D minor, and vocal music. Both her symphonies were released on CD and download, the First in C major (1868) on the Nilento label, the Second in A minor (1897) on the Sterling label. The same CD as the Second Symphony also contains her Fritiof Suite, based on the Icelandic Saga of the same name.

Andrée was Composer of the Week on BBC Radio 3, starting 10 November 2025.
