= Gustafva Röhl =

Swedish educator

Gustafva Röhl (1798–1848), was a Swedish educator.

She was the sister of Maria Röhl. She became a governess after the death of her parents in 1822, and managed a girls' school in Falun. Her school was widely respected; she was regarded as a progressive educator "both in regard to her knowledge as well as her view on life twenty years before her time" and published several books about education and pedagogy.

== Works ==
- En liten bok för att bilda små barn i de första begreppen om hvad är rätt och orätt. Falun 1842. 12:o. 12 s. — Uppl. 3: 1847.
- En liten inledning till catechesen. Falun 1842. 10:o. 20 s. Uppl. 2—4: 1844–48.
- Första steget till Gamla Testamentets historia. Till läsning för små barn. Falun 1842. 12:o. 28 s.
- Första steget till Nya Testamentets historia... Falun 1842. 12:o. 50 s.
