= Per Störby =

- Birth name: Per Störby Jutbring
- Born: 26 June 1971; Falkenberg, Sweden
- Genres: Post minimalism, electro, pop, classic
- Occupation(s): Composer, musician, producer
- Instrument(s): Piano, bandoneon, synthesizer
- Years active: 1989-present
- Labels: Hoob Records, Bibbi Records, imperial recordings, Sony, mnw
- Website: perstorbyjutbring.com

Per Störby Jutbring (born June 26, 1971) is a Swedish pianist, singer, bandoneonist and composer. Störby is the band leader of New Tide Orquesta in which he plays bandoneon besides composing all music. Per compose music for theatre, dance, television and films, recording and producing his own music and collaborating with other. He is a post minimalistic composer, blending contemporary classical with alternative pop and electronic elements, and he have also worked in a wide array of music such as electronic pop and new tango.

== Early life ==
Störby Jutbring was born in Falkenberg, Sweden. He learned piano from 10 and studied improvisation and jazz piano at the folk high school in Skurup. He moved to Gothenburg, Sweden 1991 and lived in Berlin, Germany 2006-2007 before he moved to Stockholm, Sweden 2007.

== Career ==
=== Solo work ===
In 2014 he released his first solo album Dance Of The Diaper Fairy; minimalistic compositions and improvisations performed on piano and also some tracks featuring cello and violin. He has made live performances with Per Störby Jutbring "Solo" and "Ensemble".

=== Theatre, dance ===
Since the mid 1990s he has made music for more than 30 theatre-plays, including Huset vid flon at the Stockholms city theatre, Efter Fredrik and Sisyfos at the national theatre and Den Goda Människan I Sezuan at Masthuggsteatern. In 2016-18 he made a collaboration with the American based choreographer and dance company Sidra Bell Dance New York and wrote music for the multidisciplinary performance Mönster Outside. He also contributed with conceptual dramaturgy and design and as one of the musicians besides his band New Tide Orquesta. The show premiered at Contemporary Arts Centre in New Orleans 2017.

=== New Tide Orquesta ===
Per started the band in Gothenburg 1996, by that time named as New Tango Orquesta, in which he also plays the tricky instrument Bandoneon. Since the beginning they have released eight albums and made a lot of international touring. Their music has developed from new tango to a more progressive sort of chamber music, including influences from minimalism, baroque music, improvisation, jazz and alternative pop. The band has found their very own role as the constant outsider, at a rock club in Moscow, jazz festival in Istanbul, tango club in Buenos Aires or a concert hall in Beijing.

=== Zeigeist, Pearl Fiction ===
In 2006 Per started Zeigeist, a constellation with five artists from design, performance, fashion and video art, with the ambition to put art in pop music and stage performances. He composed/produced all music and dramatist Mattias Brunn wrote the lyrics. The debut album The Jade Motel was released 2008, with several singles on rotation at the Swedish national radio and blogs, among others Pitchfork Media placed the leaked demo of Tar Heart at number sixty on their list of The Top 100 Tracks of 2006.[4] The EP ”Neverending Love” was released 2009 along with their break-up. Per started the alias Pearl fiction and released the album Painted Wolf in 2012, with the singles Run and Painted Wolf on high rotation at the Swedish international radio.

=== Film work ===
Per has composed music for film and TV including Oscar awarded Searching For Sugarman (2012), Future My Love (2012), Crystal Bear awarded My Skinny Sister (2015) and Star Boys (kaiken se kestää) (2017). He has released the scores of the films ”My Skinny Sister” and ”Star Boys” on digital albums.

=== Collaborations and other projects ===
Per has made collaborations with a wide array of artists in performances, shows, composing, arranging and producing; such as Frida Hyvönen, Laleh, Mattias Alkberg, Sven-Bertil Taube, Povel Ramel, Erik Enocksson, Midaircondo, Bosse Sundström, Simone Moreno, Melissa Horn, Sarah Riedel, Linnea Olsson, Sibille Attar, Sound of Arrows. Together with his wife, the radio and TV host Kitty Störby Jutbring, he produced a popular parent podcast in Swedish. Recording it in a prestige less way, with regular elements and interesting guests, talking about the family, sex equality and gender pedagogics.

== Personal life ==
Per is married with the Swedish radio and TV host Kitty Störby Jutbring. Together they have two kids, born 2012 and 2015. The family lives in Stockholm, Sweden.

== Discography (in selection) ==
=== Per Störby Jutbring, Albums ===
- 2014 Dance Of The Diaper Fairy (Album)
- 2015 My Skinny Sister – The Original Motion Picture Soundtrack (Album)
- 2017 Star Boys – The Original Motion Picture Soundtrack (Album)

=== New Tide Orquesta - Albums ===
- 1998 - The New Tango Orquesta
- 2000 - Part II
- 2005 - Bestiario
- 2009 - The Kiev Concert
- 2009 - Vesper
- 2012 - How To Climb A Mountain
- 2016 - Live In Rio
- 2016 - Spirits: Nursery Rhymes

=== Zeigeist - Albums and singles ===
- 2007 - Black Milk (Single)
- 2008 - Humanitarianism/Bunny (Single)
- 2008 - The Jade Motel (Album)
- 2008 - Wrecked Metal (Single)
- 2008 - Cuffs (Single)
- 2009 - Neverending Love (Ep)

=== Pearl Fiction, Albums and Singles ===
- 2010 The Ruby Fever (Single) (May)
- 2010 Insomnia (Single) (October)
- 2011 Run (Single)
- 2012 Painted Wolf (Album)
- 2012 Painted Wolf (Single)
- 2012 Talking Seems To Fade Away (Single)
- 2012 Stories From A Purple Soul (Pearl Fiction feat Malin Dahlström (Niki And The Dove) & Stefan Storm (Sound Of Arrows))

=== New Tide Orquesta - Misc ===
- 2010 - Full Scores/Text/Photos (sheet music/book)
- 2012 - Buffalo Stance (video)
- 2012 - While Sleeping (video)

== Feature films ==
- Min Lilla Syster (My Skinny Sister) by Sanna Lenken (SWE 2014)
- Kaiken Se Kestää (Star Boys) by Visa Koiso-Kanttila (FIN 2017)
- Searching For Sugarman by Malik Bendjelloul (GB/SWE 2012)
- Future My Love by Maja Borg
