= 1914 in Nordic music =

The following is a list of notable events and compositions of the year 1914 in Nordic music.

== Events ==
- 30 January – Wilhelm Stenhammar's Reverenza is included as movement no. 2 in the composer's Serenad [Serenade] at its first performance, which takes place at the Kungliga Teatern (Royal Opera House) in Stockholm, by the orchestra of the Royal Swedish Opera, with Stenhammar conducting.
- unknown date – The "Kotimainen Ooppera" is renamed "Finnish Opera".

== New works ==
- Oskar Lindberg – Concert fantasy in C minor
- Carl Nielsen – Serenata in vano
- Selim Palmgren – Ballade "Torpflickan" for Solo Voices, Choir and Orchestra
- Jean Sibelius – The Oceanides
- Wilhelm Stenhammar – Late Summer (Sensommarnätter), five piano pieces, Op. 33

== Popular music ==
- Wilhelm Peterson-Berger – "Ack, Wärmeland du sköna" (Svensk folkvisa)
- Alice Tegnér – "Bön den 6 februari 1914"

== Births ==
- 17 February – Magne Elvestrand, Norwegian pianist, harpsichordist, and organist (died 1991)
- 24 February – Eyvin Andersen, Danish organist, violinist, and composer (died 1968).
- 8 June – Kåre Siem, Norwegian musician and writer (died 1986)
- 24 June – Kari Diesen, Norwegian actor and singer (died 1987)
- 5 July – Gerda Gilboe, Danish actress and singer (died 2009)
- 18 August – Irmgard Österwall, Swedish jazz singer (died 1980)
- 3 November – Hallgrímur Helgason, Icelandic composer (died 1994)
- 18 November – Leif Solberg, Norwegian organist and composer (died 2016)

== Deaths ==
- 1 March – Tor Aulin, Swedish violinist, conductor and composer (born 1866)
- 16 October – Wilhelmina Strandberg, Swedish operatic mezzo-soprano (born 1845)
- 9 November – Princess Teresia, German-born Swedish princess, composer

== See also ==
- 1914 in Denmark
- 1914 in Norwegian music
- 1914 in Sweden
