= Ninedee =

Swedish industrial metal band

- Origin: Sweden
- Genres: Industrial; Metal; Crossover
- Years active: 1997–2005, 2009-
- Label: Dreamnation Studios
- Members: Marcus Eriksson; Henrik Söderlund; Anders Bergegran
- Past members: Örjan Viklund; Fredrik Granberg; Jimi Marklund
- Website: Official website

Ninedee is a Swedish industrial/metal/crossover band founded by former Shield guitarist Marcus Eriksson in 1998.

== Discography ==
=== ALBUM ===
==== I En Värld Av Hat ====
1. Nailed to the Cross
2. 999
3. We Were Gods
4. Jag Älskade Er Av Kärlek En Gång
5. Judge
6. Centipede
7. Ignoransens Högborg
8. I Dream of Nothing
9. Thorns Shall Grow
10. När Ljuset Slocknar
11. Där Ondskan Möter Oss

Releasedate: 2018.09.09
Media: DIGI, Vinyl LP
Catnr: DNS110
Additional information: Vinyl LP, edition limited to 99 copies (180 g). Comes with 20 x 20 cm booklet.

=== EP ===
==== Thorns Shall Grow ====
1. Thorns Shall Grow
2. Are Demons My Angels
3. Skymning

Releasedate: 2014.09.09
Media: DIGI
Catnr: DNS107

==== We Were Gods ====
1. We Were Gods
2. Turning Point

Releasedate: 2014.05.15
Media: DIGI
Catnr: DNS106

==== Infusco ====
1. Antebellum
2. Ora Pro Nobis
3. Mors Ianua Vitae

Releasedate: 2012.08.01
Media: DIGI
Catnr: DNS102

==== Egoism ====
1. Bleeding
2. Consumed
3. Rise
4. Faces
5. Miss Wannabe

Releasedate: 2010.12.23
Media: CD, DIGI
Catnr: DNS101
Additional information: CD, edition limited to 500 copies, individually numbered.

==== Discipline ====
1. Alone
2. Filter
3. Turning Point
4. Miss Wannabe
5. Manifesto

Releasedate: 2004.01.01
Media: CD
Catnr: DNSP01
Additional information: -

=== Other releases ===
==== När Ljuset Slocknar ====
1. Nailed to the Cross
2. We Were Gods
3. Ignoransens Högborg
4. När Ljuset Slocknar

Releasedate: 2018.01.10
Media: Cassette
Catnr: DNSP02
Additional information: Edition limited to 50 copies.

==== CAS9D (split) ====
1. Chaos All Stars – The Contract (featuring Kya Wolfwritten)
2. Chaos All Stars – Volcano (Remixed by Ninedee)
3. Chaos All Stars – Influx (Autumn Light Festival Version)
4. Ninedee – Lies
5. Ninedee – Consumed (Remixed by Chaos All Stars)
6. Ninedee – Mental

Releasedate: 2011.10.10
Media: 12" Vinyl
Catnr: EPOS1101
Additional information: 12" clear vinyl, edition limited to 200 copies.
