= Josef Herou =

Swedish actor (1884–1960)

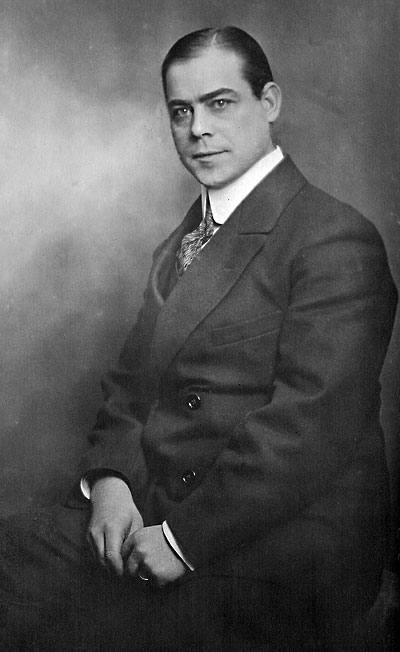
Josef Herou, circa 1920

Carl Josef Nicanor Herou (6 October 1884 – 10 March 1960) was a Swedish operatic baritone.

== Biography ==
Herau was a blacksmith from the very beginning. His voice was noticed during his military service by the officers, who arranged money for his training. He studied at the Conservatory of the Royal Swedish Academy of Music from 1905 to 1909 with Oskar Lejdström and Nils Personne and further at the Opera School from 1905 to 1909, and in Milan in 1914.

He made his debut as Escamillo in Carmen in 1909 at the Royal Swedish Opera, where he was permanently engaged until 1934. In 1912, Herou guest starred at the Berlin State Opera.

He appeared in roles such as Beckmesser in Die Meistersinger von Nürnberg, Alberich in Das Rheingold, Jago in Otello, Telramund in Lohengrin, Amonasro in Aida, and the title role in Der fliegende Holländer. He also sang Swedish roles in operas such as Ture Rangström's Medeltida and modern operas such as Schreker's Der ferne Klang. In total, he performed about 60 roles.

His voice captured the audience, and the qualities of his voice and performance were praised. Herou left the opera stage in 1934 and then worked as a singing teacher in Stockholm.

== Sources ==
- Sohlmans musiklexikon: nordiskt och allmänt uppslagsverk för tonkonst, musikliv och dans. Stockholm: Sohlman. 1948–1952. p. 1061
- Joseph Herou
- De kungliga teatrarna, Leopolds antikvariat
