= Shivering Spines =

Swedish indie rock band

Shivering Spines was a Swedish indie rock band from Jönköping, active from 1988 to 1993. They won PolyGram's Rock Band of the Year for 1990 and had a top-40 single, "Heaven Is...", in 1992.

== History ==
Shivering Spines was formed in 1988. The initial line-up was Fredrik "Fido" Johansson (drums), Pelle Gustafsson (vocals), Dan Jälmeborg and Sven-Åke Svensson (bass); Svensson and Jälmeborg were veterans of a punk band, Pöbel Möbel, which had formed on the Råslätt housing estate in Jönköping. Johansson, also formerly of Pöbel Möbel, soon moved to the US, and was replaced by Johan Häll on drums and Janne (Jannicke) Meijner, also a punker, on guitar.

For their 1989 debut single, on Tilt Records, they released a video for the A-side, "Desert Hum"; some members of the band were in the media track at Södra Vätterbygdens folkhögskola. "Desert Hum" was called "cowboy rock" by one rock writer, but also showed influences from Irish folk music. In early 1990 they released a second single, "Judas Kiss", also on Tilt Records, praised in one rock magazine as "hit[ting] the mark squarely". The song "Judas Kiss" is included on the compilation album The Swedish Stand 1990.

The band was named "Rock Band of the Year" in 1990 by PolyGram, after which they gained wider recognition in Sweden, performing at a prominent club in Stockholm and at festivals including Dala-Rock and the Hultsfred Festival. The award came with a deal to record a single; after hearing nothing further, Shivering Spines eventually sent in "Heaven Is..." and a second song, but PolyGram were unenthusiastic. Released in 1992, the single peaked at number 36 in the Swedish singles chart.

In 1993, they released their debut album, Garlic Escargots, on Brimstone. The album showed their eclecticism, including a cover of AC/DC's "You Shook Me All Night Long" and other songs blending pop and folk with rock; Jälmeborg played mandolin as well as guitar. "Repulsion", which comes close to grunge, was recorded in 1992 live at a club in Jönköping and includes Gustafsson auctioning off a watch.

The album was well received, but Shivering Spines broke up later in 1993. Häll has since been in several bands including Hellspray.

== Discography ==
Desert Hum / Power (7", Tilt Records, Spines 001, 1989)

Judas Kiss / Pros and Cons of Convertible Homes (7", Tilt Records, Spines 002, 1990)

Live Kulturhuset 14 sept-91 (MC, Tilt Records, Spines 003, 1991)

Heaven is... / The Night Before Today (7"/CD, PolyGram, 866750-7, 1992)

Garlic Escargots (CD, Brimstone Production, BRCD 9301, 1993)

== Videos ==
Desert Hum (1989)

Heaven is... (1992)

December Live (1992) (live from Kåren in Jönköping, Brimstone Production, BRVD 9212)

Lying Awake (1993) (from Garlic Escargots, Brimstone Production, BRVD 9306)
