= Callinaz =

Swedish dansband

- Origin: Skåne, Sweden
- Genres: Dansband music
- Years active: 2010–
- Label: Atenzia Records

Callinaz is a Swedish dansband presently made up of Carolina, Andreas, Mikael, Tom and Simon. The band debuted with the 2011 album Från mörker till ljus that reached number 8 on Sverigetopplistan the official Swedish Albums Chart. The band has released 5 albums.

== Discography ==
=== Albums ===
Year	Album	Peak positions	Certification
Year	Album	SWE	Certification
2011	Från mörker till ljus	8	
2012	Så kom jag till Provence	11	
2014	Fest i folkets park	15	
2015	Lite som du vill	34	
