= Bärwald =

Bärwald (transliterated Baerwald, German: bear forest) may refer to:

- Alexander Baerwald (1877–1930) German architect
- David Baerwald (born 1960), American musician
- Franz Berwald (1796–1868), Swedish-born composer
- Hans Baerwald (1880–1946), German physicist and professor
- Helmut Bärwald (1928–2003), German politician
- Hermann Bärwald (1828–1907), German educator and author
- Moritz Baerwald (1860–1919), German politician
- Paul Baerwald (1871–1961), German-born American banker and philanthropist
- Richard Baerwald (1867–1929), German psychologist
