= Bjärv =

Swedish modern folk music ensemble

Bjärv is a modern folk ensemble from Sweden.

Mikael Grafström plays guitar and is from Ångermanland, Sweden; Fiddler Olof Gothlin is from Värmland, Sweden; Benjamin R. Teitelbaum is from Evergreen, Colorado and plays nyckelharpa. The three met at the Eric Sahlström Institute in Tobo, Sweden in 2001.

Mikael and Olof are study folk music at the music academy in Malmö, Sweden. Olof became a Riksspelman in 2006. Mikael Grafström is an increasingly prominent nyckelharpa builder. Benjamin has studied at Bethany College and the Royal College of Music in Stockholm, becoming the first North American to earn a bachelor's degree in nyckelharpa performance. Ben is a doctoral student in ethnomusicology at Brown University.

The band's name is a portmanteau of the Swedish words for bear and wolverine.

They have toured the United States frequently during the last ten years.
