= My heart is a metronome =

Swedish rock band

- Origin: Uppsala, Sweden
- Years active: 2012-present
- Label: Raw street noise
- Members: Mattis Malinen; Gustaf Simonsson; Felix Carlsten
- Website: Officiell webbplats

My heart is a metronome (MHIAM) is a Swedish rock band from Uppsala with Mattis Malinen (vocals/guitars), Gustaf Simonsson (bass/backup vocals) and Felix Carlsten (drums/backup vocals).

== Music career ==
My heart is a metronome started out in 2010, as singer and guitarist Mattis Malinen's solo project. In late winter 2012, he self-recorded the EP ”Sketches” at his family cabin in northern Sweden. After testing his songs on a hobo tour through Europe the solo project grew to a trio in spring 2012, when he got company from bassist Gustaf Simonsson and drummer Felix Carlsten. In February 2013 their first single as a band "Spring" was released. The song was recorded in a basement in their hometown Uppsala.

MHIAM released their self produced EP ”The Colouring” in April 2014. The single ”The Whistler” crested the Swedish national radio P3 contest for unsigned bands for four consecutive weeks, and consequently got added to the P3 rotation list.

In October 2014, the band went on a British tour, consisting of ten gig dates in England and Wales, and shortly thereafter got signed to fresh Swedish indie label Substitute Music Group. First single ”Turtle” was played in Swedish national television for the biggest yearly charity event in Sweden Musikhjälpen.

In June 2015 MHIAM released "Feel > Think", their third single since signing with Substitute Music Group and in March 2016 they released their own version of the 60's Motown hit "Ain't No Mountain High Enough".

In February 2017 the band released the EP "Tierp", mixed by three time Swedish Grammy-winner Pelle Gunnerfeldt and mastered by Robin Schmidt, with indie label Soul City Enterprise. The title track and single "Tierp" was featured in the BAFTA Award-winning TV series Made in Chelsea and was featured in the monthly indie rock playlist of April 2017 by YouTuber Alexrainbird

In May 2018 MHIAM signed a management deal with Erik Grönwall at Hagenburg AB.

In January 2019 the band signed with Docks Music (Sony). and released the EP 'Benevolence' three singles Produced by Dino Medanhodzic/Simon Nordberg, mixed by Dino/Pelle Gunnerfeldt and mastered by Dino/Magnus Lindberg. The single 'Diamonds' was picked up by some of the big Spotify editorial playlists.

My heart is a metronome is set to release their debut album in the spring of 2024, produced and mixed by Jakob Grundtman (Tallest man on earth, Francis) and mastered by Sören von Malmborg (Coldplay, Sia, Avicii). First single 'Get it right' was released on 24 November 2023, followed up by 'Yours Now' on 29 December and 'Ghosts' on 19 January 2024.

Aside from the album, but in the same production constellation, the band 27 October 2023 released their cover of Donna Lewis' 90's smash hit 'I love you always forever'.

== Discography ==
=== Albums ===
- 2024: TBA

=== EPs ===
- 2012: Sketches
- 2014: The Colouring
- 2017: Tierp
- 2019: Benevolence

=== Singles ===
- 2013: "Spring"
- 2014: "The Whistler"
- 2014: "Turtle"
- 2015: "Feel > Think"
- 2016: "Ain't No Mountain High Enough (cover)"
- 2017: "Tierp"
- 2019: "Landslide"
- 2019: "Mother of all mothers"
- 2019: "Tonight"
- 2019: "Diamonds"
- 2023: "I love you always forever (cover)"
- 2023: "Get it right"
