= Gert Jonnys =

- Origin: Sweden
- Genres: Dansband
- Years active: 1970s–1980s

Gert Jonnys was a Swedish dansband during the 1970s and 1980s. Its leader, Gert Jonny Hansson left the band in 1982, and since 1988, the three remaining members and one additional member, are known as Freddy's, led by Freddy Pedersen and Chris Bittner. They still perform occasionally in the southern parts of Sweden, in Denmark and on the Canary Islands, although the members also have day jobs.

The band was relatively unknown until a number of old promotional pictures were posted on the Internet and gained instant cult status. These pictures, along with pictures of other Swedish dance orchestras, have been posted on websites from Sweden, Norway, the United States, Portugal, Germany, the United Kingdom, and various other countries.
