= Ida Lövgren =

Swedish opera singer

Ida Lövgren was a Swedish opera singer.

== Career ==
She was engaged at the Royal Swedish Opera in Stockholm in 1855–56, and then in Germany. In 1857 she sang Norma in Amsterdam. In 1860, she married the German opera singer Herrmann Cesar at the Royal Opera in Berlin. She was then engaged with her spouse in several stages in Germany, as well as in Vienna and Budapest.
