= Joachim Neergaard =

Danish composer (1877–1920)

Joachim Bruun Neergaard
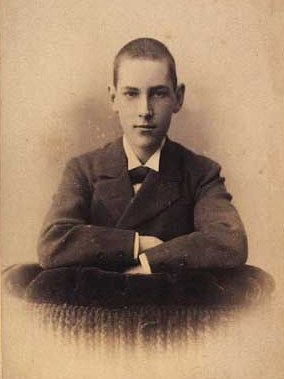
- Neergaard photographed circa 1900
- Born: April 27, 1877; Stubberup, Denmark
- Died: October 31, 1920 (aged 43); Sorø, Denmark
- Resting place: Vestre Cemetery (Copenhagen)

Joachim Bruun Neergaard (27 April 1877 – 31 October 1920) was a Danish composer and pianist. As a composer he wrote works for violin, piano, and orchestral pieces. Neergaard produced fewer than 30 works in his short lifetime.

== Early life and education ==
Joachim Bruun Neergaard was born on 27 April 1877 in Stubberup to Sophie Louise Bardenfleth (1855–1947) and Vilhelm Peter Christian Bruun Neergaard (1846–1912). His family was part of the aristocracy and his father, Vilhelm Peter, was a hofjægermester and chamberlain. His maternal grandfather, Carl Emil Bardenfleth, had been a politician and Governor of Iceland.

As a child, Neergaard received piano lessons from Tekla Gähler. Following in his family's political and aristocratic legacy, he began formal schooling in 1895 and was awarded a law degree in 1901. However, Neergaard continued to pursue his passion between 1895 and 1908 by studying the piano with Ove Christiansen, music theory with Orla Rosenhoff, and instrumentation with Johan Svendsen.

== Career ==
Neergaard made his debut as a composer in 1906 with orchestral arrangements (op. 4) which were performed at Tivoli's concert hall. That year, he also gave a performance on the piano which included his violin sonata in B flat minor, performed by Ludvig Holm. In 1908, he won a competition put on by Asger Hamerik and the Dansk Koncert-Forening for his concert overture in A minor (op. 5). Between 1908 and 1910 he composed his string quartet in C minor (op. 6), a late-romantic, "post-Brahmsian" work.

Few of his works have been published. These include: a string quartet (op. 6), piano quintet (op. 10), romance for trombone and orchestra (op. 13), a waltz intermezzo for piano, and six small piano pieces. His style has been described as sober and melodious, though he did not partake in the more modern trends of his era. His greatest stylistic influences were likely Pyotr Ilyich Tchaikovsky and his former teacher Johan Svendsen.

In 1910, Neergaard debuted as a conductor with the partial performance of his B minor symphony (op. 8). The symphony would later be performed in its entirety in 1912. He conducted again in 1814 in Berlin. From the mid 1910s onwards, Neergaard lived in Sorø where he stayed reclusively for the remainder of his life. He died there on 31 October 1920. He was buried at Vestre Cemetery in Copenhagen.
