= 1971 in Norwegian music =

The following is a list of notable events and releases of the year 1971 in Norwegian music.

Lars Levin guitarist and keyboardist of Greenhouze, born 04.12.1971

== Events ==
=== May ===
- The 19th Bergen International Festival started in Bergen, Norway.

=== June ===
- The 8th Kongsberg Jazz Festival started in Kongsberg, Norway.

=== August ===
- The 12th Moldejazz started in Molde, Norway.

=== September ===
- 5 – The 1st Kalvøyafestivalen started at Kalvøya near by Oslo.

== Albums released ==
=== Unknown date ===
A

Arild Andersen

- Underwear (ECM Records), with Bobo Stenson and Jon Christensen

G

Jan Garbarek

- Sart (ECM Records), with Bobo Stenson, Terje Rypdal, Arild Andersen, and Jon Christensen

R

Terje Rypdal

- Terje Rypdal (ECM Records)

V

Jan Erik Vold

- HAV (Philips Records), with Jan Garbarek

== Births ==
January

- 5 – Stian Carstensen, multi-instrument, entertainer, and composer (Farmers market).
- 26 – Helge "Deathprod" Sten, ambient artist and record producer.

February

- 1 – Siri Gjære, jazz singer.
- 16 – Øyvind Brandtsegg, electronica and jazz percussionist, programmer and composer.

April

- 2 – Solveig Slettahjell, jazz singer and composer.
- 25 – Trygve Seim, jazz saxophonist and composer.
- 26 – Christian Wallumrød, jazz pianist, keyboardist, and composer.

May

- 12 – Kristin Asbjørnsen, jazz singer and composer.
- 15 – Erland Dahlen, jazz drummer and percussionist.

June

- 7 – Håvard Fossum, jazz saxophonist, flautist, composer and music arranger.
- 29 – Ingar Zach, jazz percussionist and businessman.

July

- 12 – Unni Wilhelmsen, singer, songwriter and musician.
- 15 – Jacob Holm-Lupo, guitarist, composer, and music producer.

September

- 23 – Ingebrigt Håker Flaten, jazz upright bassist.

October

- 17 – Kim Ljung, bassist, guitarist, keyboardist, and vocalist.
- 19 – Helén Eriksen, jazz saxophonist, vocalist, songwriter and music arranger.
- 24 – Frode Berg, upright bassist.

December

- 17 – Rita Engedalen, vocalist, guitarist, and songwriter.
- 18 – Tommy Tee, record producer, rapper, broadcaster, record executive, concert promoter and magazine publisher.

Unknown date

- Isak Rypdal, music producer and founder of Crab Key Records.

== See also ==
- 1971 in Norway
- Music of Norway
- Norway in the Eurovision Song Contest 1971
