= Robert Bennesh =

Swedish organist (born 1986)

- Born: July 31, 1986 (age 40); Bjärred, Skåne
- Education: The University of Music in Malmö and Yale University
- Occupation: Organist
- Employer: Uppsala Cathedral
- Board member of: Church of Sweden Music Council
- Spouse: Rickard Andersson
- Website: https://www.svenskakyrkan.se/uppsaladomkyrka/organister-och-korledare-

Robert Bennesh (born 31 July 1986) is a Swedish organist who, since September 2024, has been the organist at the Uppsala Cathedral, having moved from his position as organist at Lund Cathedral in Lund taken up in 2016. In 2016, he founded the 'Festival of Sacred Arts,' launching in 2017, and has won numerous awards for his musical capabilities.

== Education ==
Bennesh gained his education firstly at the age of ten, beginning with piano and quickly progressing to organ.

He later sought his bachelors studies at the Royal Danish Academy of Music and continued with a Masters at the Malmö Academy of Music. Following this, he studied at the Institute of Sacred Music at Yale University, receiving a master's in music in 2014 and an artist's diploma in 2015.

== Career ==
Bennesh has performed at numerous festivals, among them the Lund Sacred Contemporary Music Festival, as well as Orchestra New England's Colonial Concert in Connecticut.

He has played and premiered works by contemporary composers such as Judith Bingham, Benjamen Staern, Staffan Storm, Per Gunnar Petersson, Stefan Klaverdal, Eli Tausen á Lava, Daniel Hjorth, and Hanna Blomberg.

== Awards ==
- Julia R. Sherman Memorial Prize
- Mary Baker Scholarship

== Recordings ==
- 2020: Humperdinck, Music for the Stage (Naxos, Dario Salvi)
- 2017: Faure Requiem & Other Sacred Music (Hyperion, David Hill)
