= Maria Röhl =

Swedish artist (1801–1875)

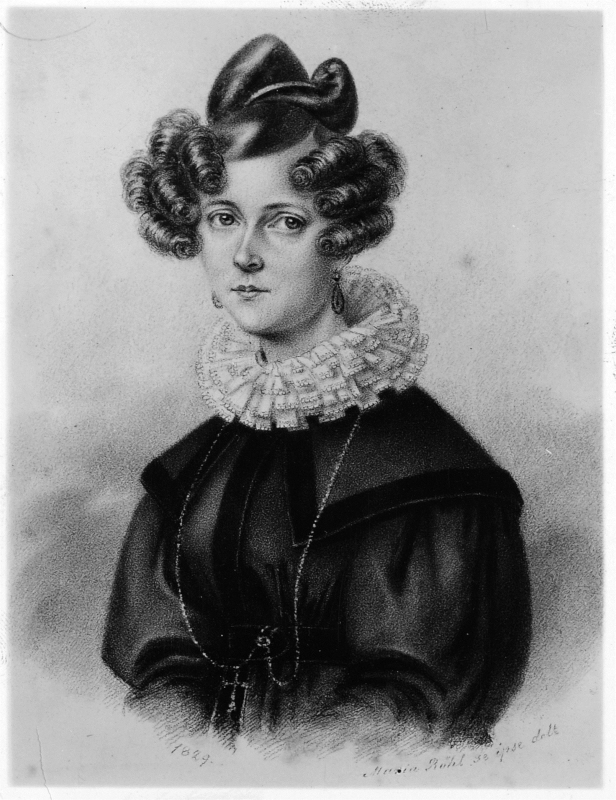
- Self-portrait, 1829
- Born: Maria Christina Röhl; 26 July 1801; Stockholm, Sweden
- Died: 5 July 1875 (aged 73); Stockholm, Sweden
- Known for: Drawing, painting

Maria Christina Röhl (26 July 1801 – 5 July 1875) was a Swedish portrait artist. She made portraits of many of the best known people in Sweden in the first half of the 19th century. Her paintings are exhibited at the Nationalmuseum in Stockholm. The Swedish Royal library has a collection of 1800 portraits by her. She was a member of the Royal Swedish Academy of Arts (1843) and an official portrait artist of the royal court.

== Biography ==
Maria Röhl was born in Stockholm in a well-off family. She was the daughter of the consul Jacob Röhl and Maria Christina Kierrman and sister of educator Gustafva Röhl (1798–1848).

After the death of their parents in 1822, she first worked as a governess. She was educated in drawing by the professor and copper engraver Christian Forssell (1777–1852); she had already received education in art by architect and artist Alexander Hambré (1790–1818) and was now taught to make quick and realistic portrait drawings in lead and chalk.

She began to draw the friends of the Forsell family, where she lived, and soon it became fashionable in high society to be portrayed by "mamsell Röhl", and she was able to support herself as an artist. She was much employed by those who couldn't pay to be painted in oil, and drew a large number of famous Swedes of the time, both aristocrats and actors. Maria Röhl did paint in oil, but the majority of her work are drawings in lead and chalk.

In 1843, Röhl was appointed court painter, and in 1843–1846, she studied in Paris with portrait painter Leon Cogniet (1794–1880) at the École des Beaux-arts. After her return, she established her own studio at Brunkebergstorg in Stockholm. During her last years, the art of photography became a harsh rival to her drawn portraits. She died in Stockholm.

== Gallery ==
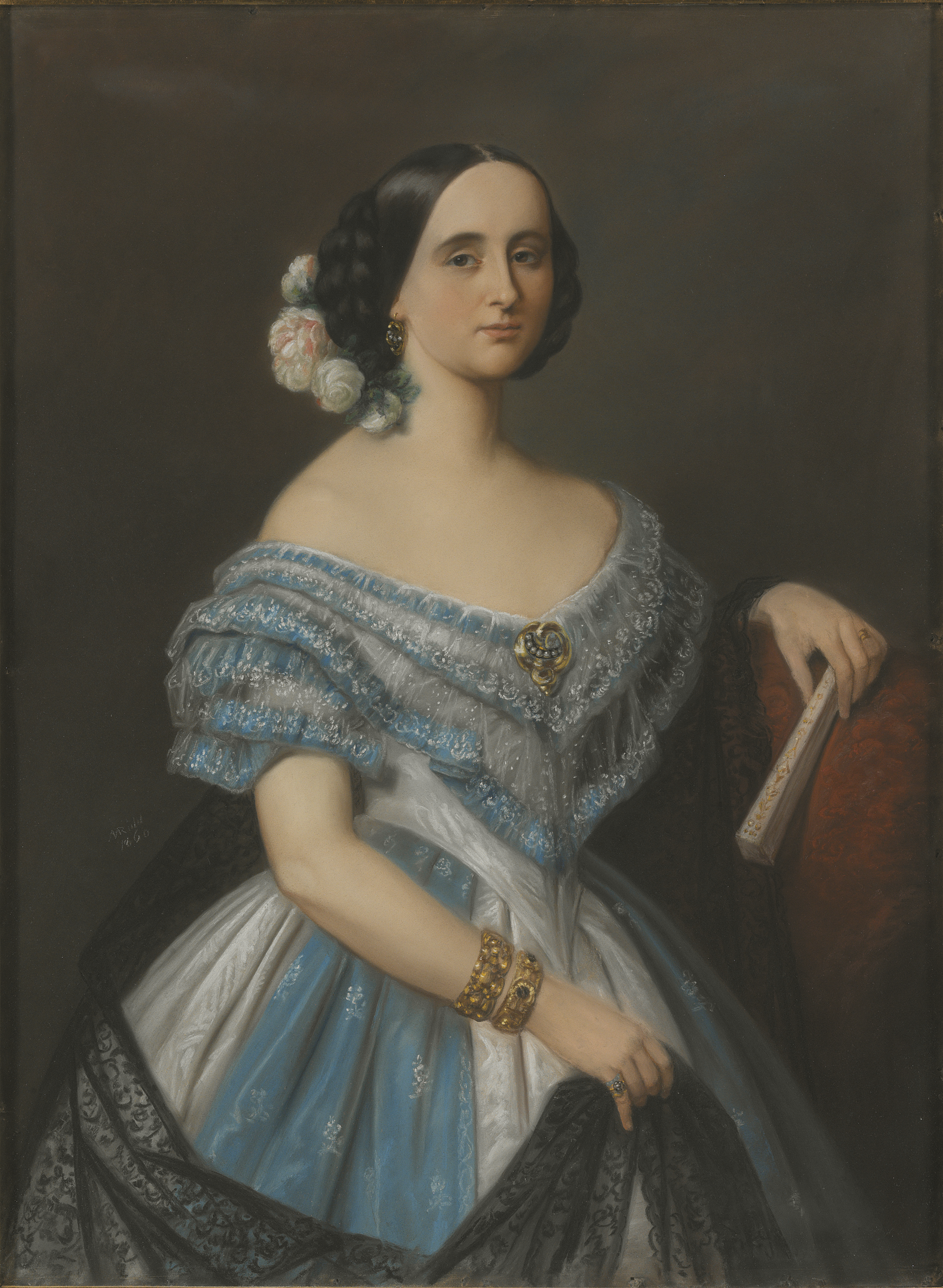
Opera singer Julie Berwald

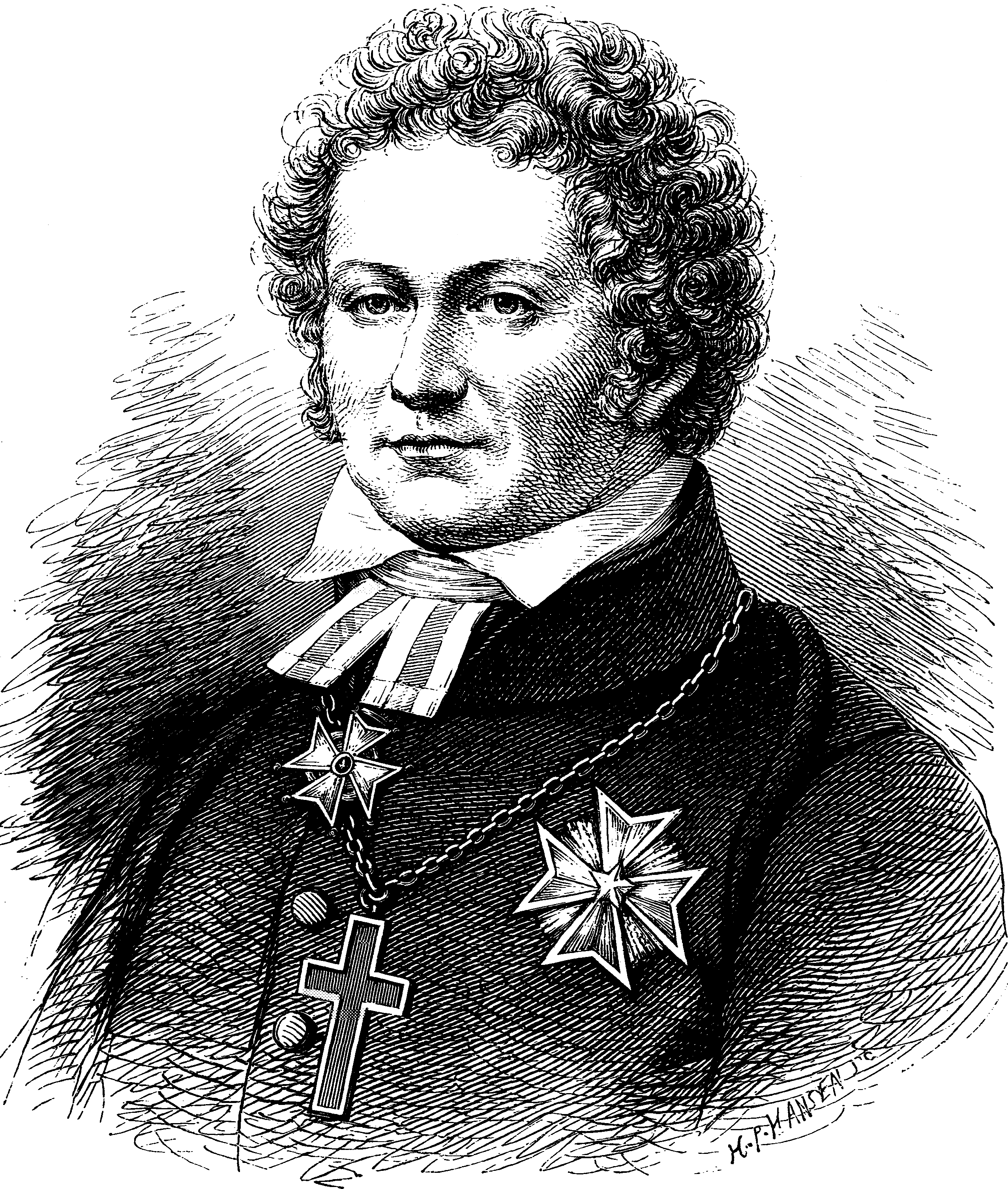
Swedish poet Esaias Tegnér
(1829)

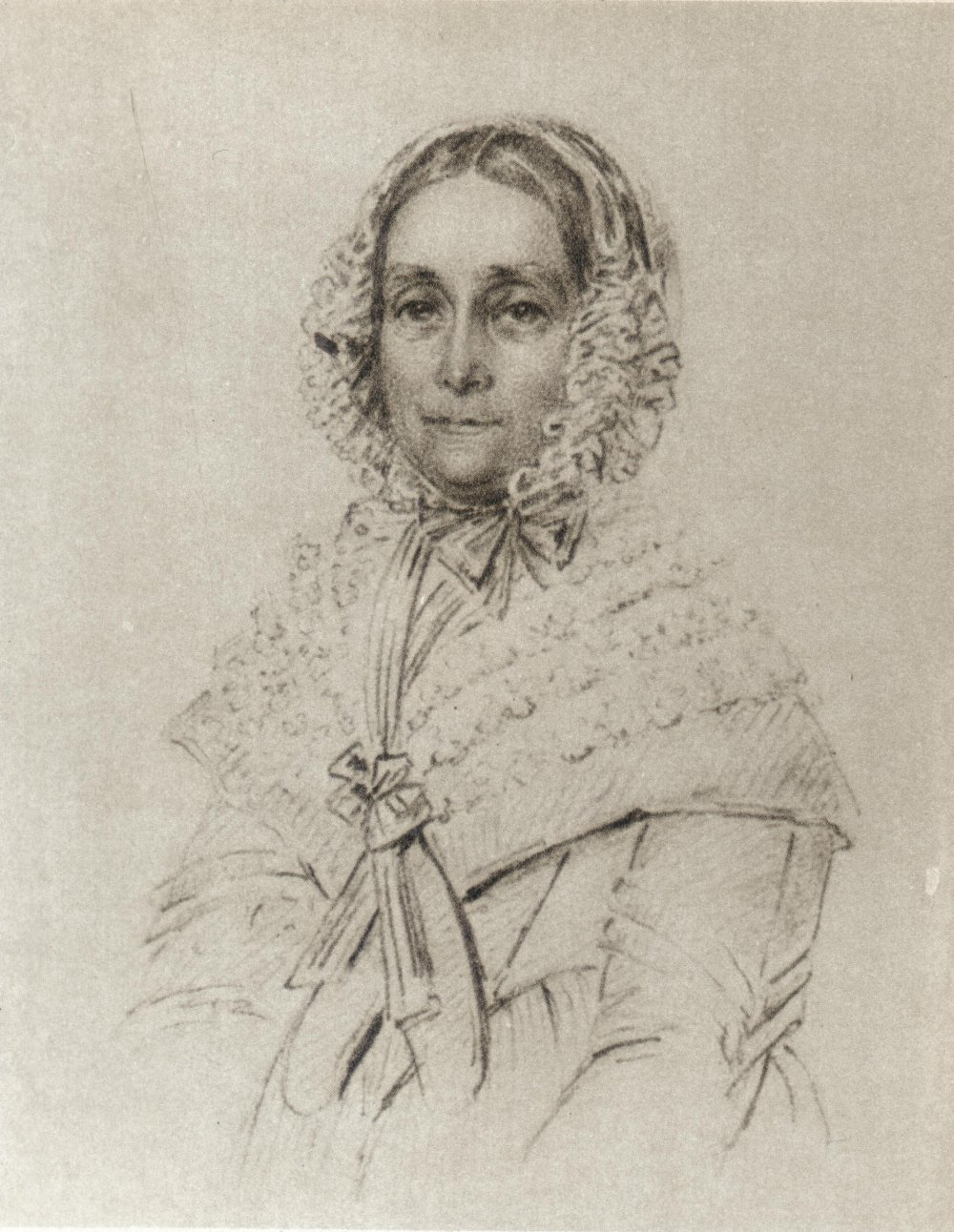
Salonist Malla Silfverstolpe, 1843

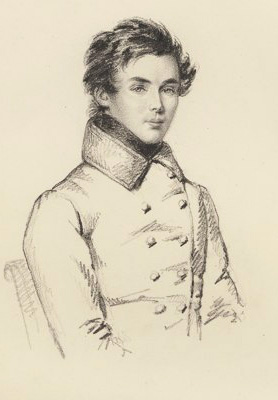
Litographer Johan Cardon

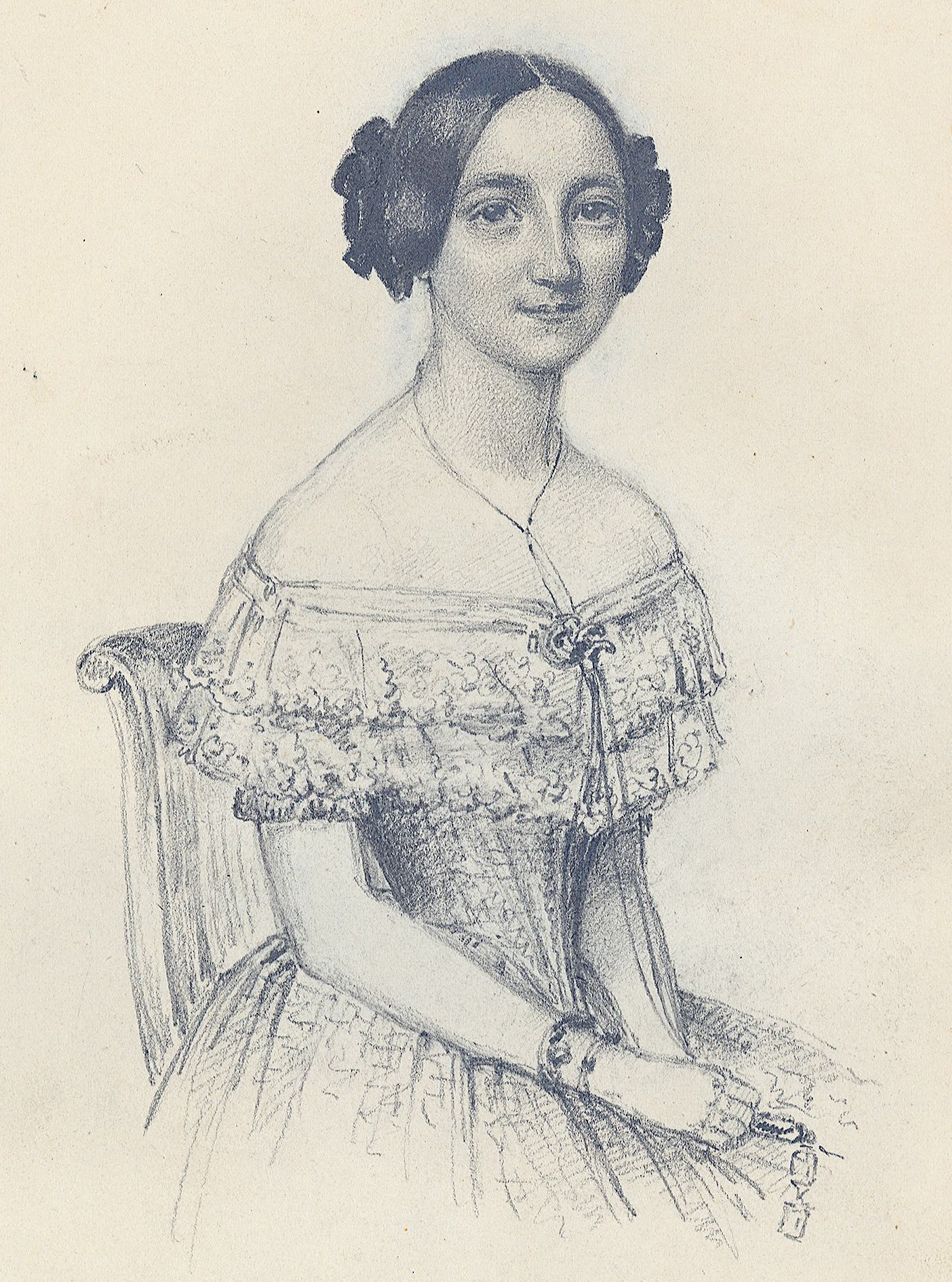
Wilhelmina Fundin
(1842)

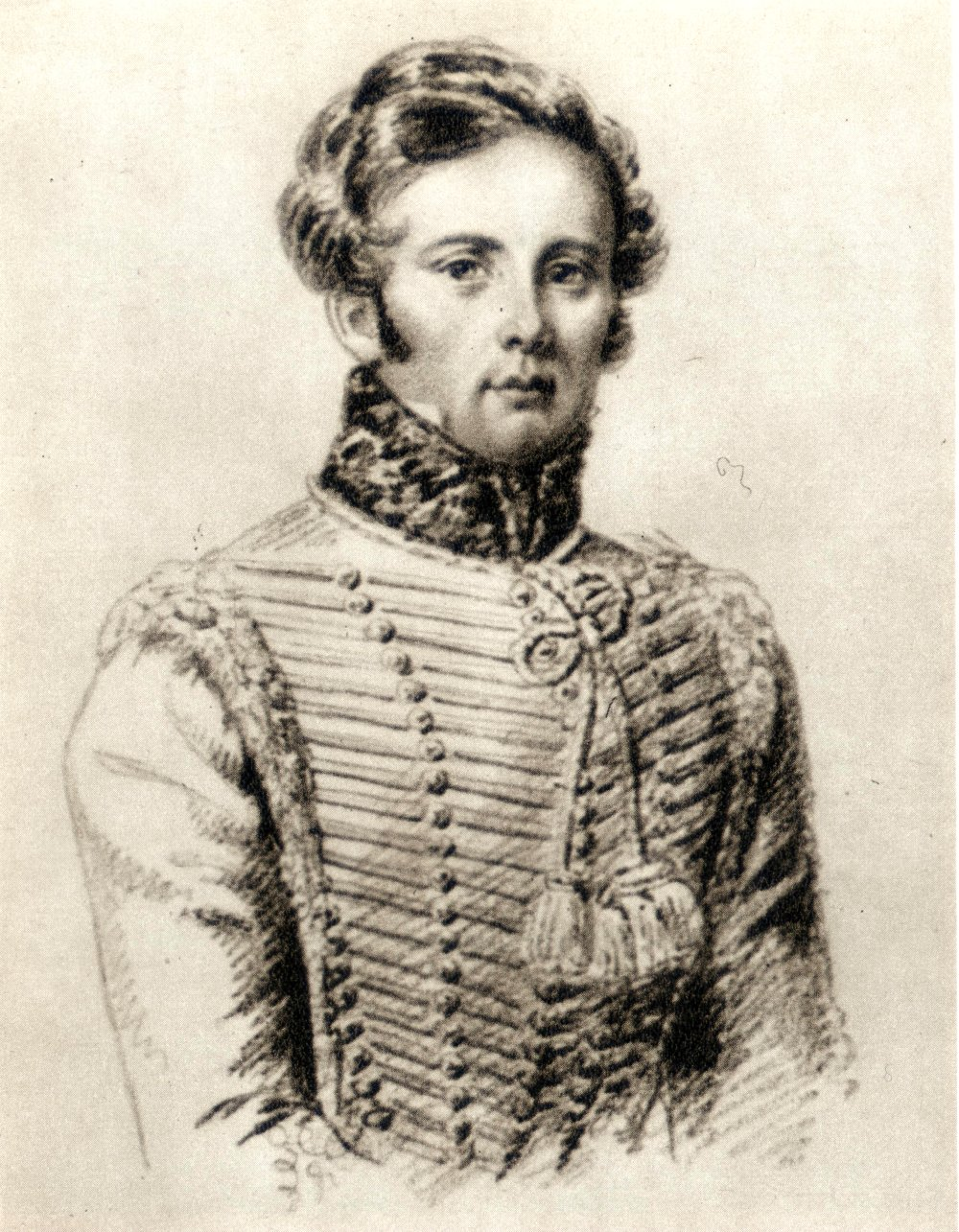
Governor count Jakob Essen Hamilton, 1834

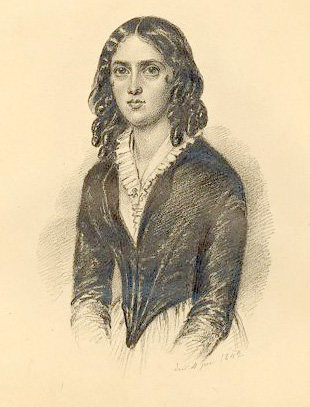
Wendela Hebbe
1842

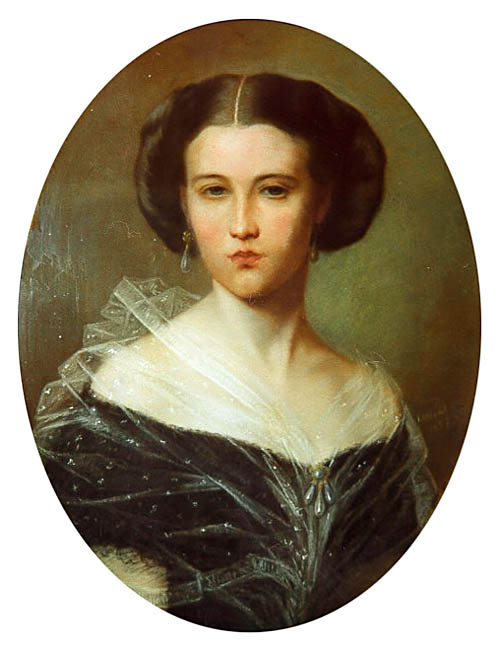
Ida Cardon, 1857

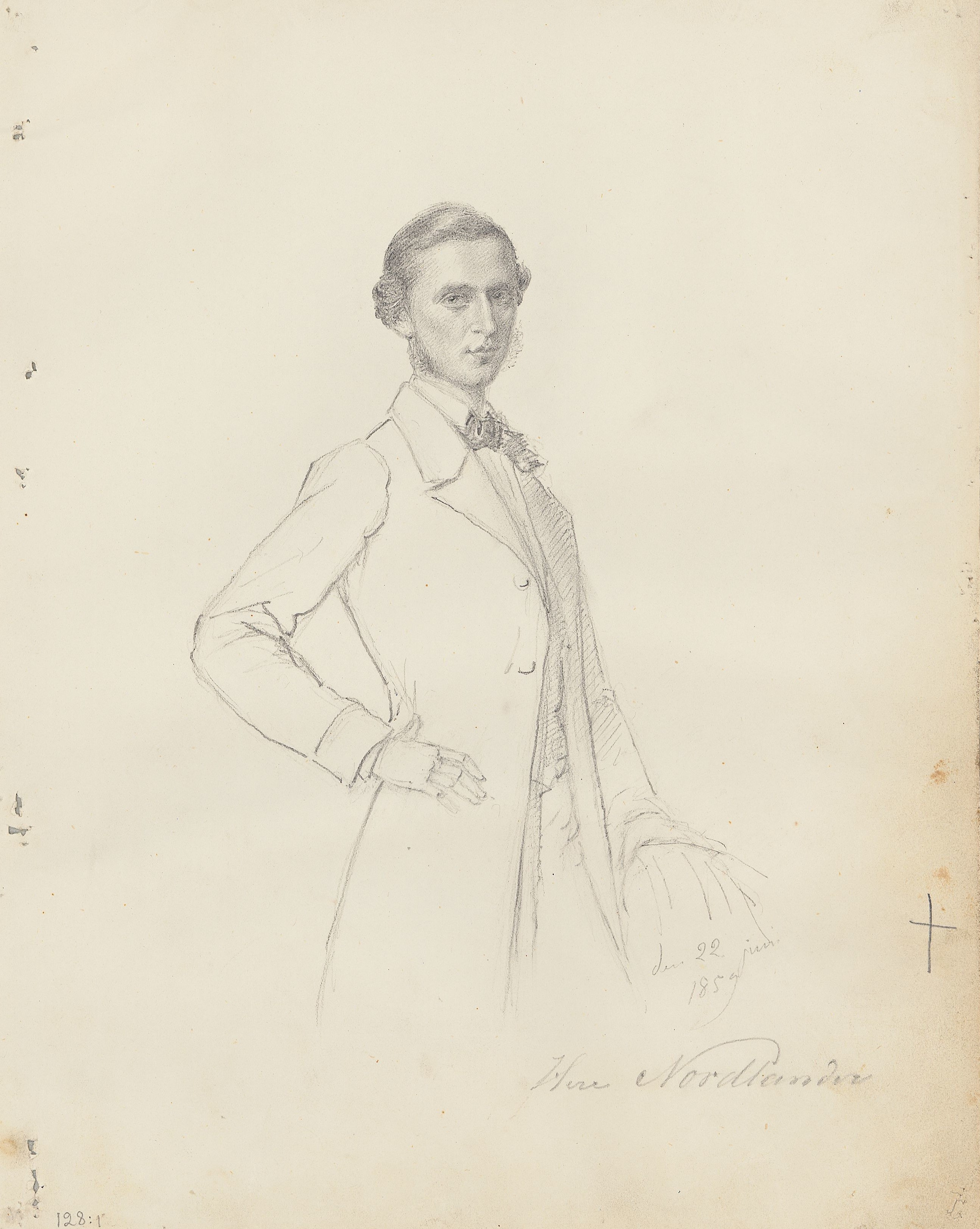
Daniel Nordlander (1859)
