= Van (band) =

Swedish musical group

Van was a Swedish musical group making dance covers of classical music. The group consisted of writers and producers Lönn and Wolfgang, and Thérèse Engdahl on vocals. On "Ice Got My Love", Engdahl gets help with the backing vocals from Ellinor Franzén.

Van released one album, Classica, in 1999.

Their single "Ice Got My Love" was based on Mozart's Symphony No. 40. The music video, which was regularly played on MTV, featured Estonian violinist Camille and members of the Royal Swedish Opera's orchestra (the Kungliga Hovkapellet). The single reached number 11 in the Swedish national charts and number 13 in the Trackslistan Top 20 in October 1998.

== Discography ==
=== Studio albums ===
Classica

Studio album by Van
- Released: 1999
- Recorded: ?
- Genre: Eurodance
- Length: 40:36
- Label: Stockholm Records
- Producer: ?

- Classica (1999). Track listing:
1. "Van Supersonic" – 0:51
2. "2001" – 1:27
3. "Ice Got My Love" – 3:31
4. "Winter In Paradise" – 3:43
5. "Ludwig Van" – 3:32
6. "Love Is A Shadow" – 4:24
7. "Get Enough" – 4:04
8. "Queen Of The Night" – 3:23
9. "Count Dracula" – 4:22
10. "Under The Milkyway" – 4:01
11. "Deep In My Heart" – 3:25
12. "La Luna De La Notte" – 3:59

=== Singles ===
- Ludwig Van (1998)
- Ice Got My Love (1998)
- Winter In Paradise (1999)
