= Maria Eklund =

Russian-born Swedish conductor

Maria Eklund (born 1973) is a Russian-born Swedish conductor. In 2005, she became the first woman to conduct an orchestra at the Bolshoi Theater in Moscow, breaking the barriers of what so far was a strictly male area of expertise. She conducted The Golden Cockerel by Rimsky-Korsakov.

== Early life and education ==
Eklund was born in Moscow in a family of Russian intelligentsia. Her paternal grandmother was an accomplished pianist who graduated from The Moscow Conservatoire at the same time as the pianist and conductor Vladimir Ashkenazy. Her paternal grandfather is a physics scientist who worked at The Kurtchatov Institute in Moscow before relocating to Switzerland. She gained a university degree in choir conducting and pedagogical training in subjects such as conducting at Master level at the Tchaikovsky Conservatory, in the class of Viktor Krasnoshekov, and Gnesin's Music Academy, in the class of Galina Rozdestvenskaya (1992–1997).

She took a postgraduate course at the Royal College of Music in Stockholm in orchestral and choir conducting (1997–2000), in the class of Anders Eby and Jing Wang.

== Orchestras conducted ==
Eklund has conducted the Gothenburg Symphony Orchestra, Gävle Symphony Orchestra, Västerås Sinfonietta, the Norrland Opera Orchestra, Nordic Chamber Orchestra, Folk Opera, Stockholm Strauss Orchestra, Swedish Wind Ensemble, Linköping Wind Ensemble, the Royal Swedish Navy Band, the Bolshoi Theatre, the Arena di Verona, Moscow Philharmonic Orchestra, Russian State Symphony Orchestra, St. Petersburg State Symphony Orchestra, the Berlin Sinfonietta, the China National Opera, Krasnoyarsk Opera Theatre, the Ulyanovsk Symphony Orchestra, Tomsk Symphony Orchestra, the Orchestra "Moscow Philharmonic", the Russian State Symphonic Capella, Brno Symphony Orchestra, Orchestra of the Royal Academy in London and others.

== Involvement in gender equality in classical music ==
Since 2012, Eklund has been actively involved in KUPP – a unique professional body for female conductors in Sweden which works towards gender equality within the profession of classical orchestra conducting. This association publishes annual reports on statistics of male and female soloist and conductors in Sweden, touching the areas of Swedish vs foreign musicians and agencies represented in classical music life of Sweden. Due to their work a vast amount of questions moved into public discussions in media and political venues, including regular meetings with the leaders of the Departments of Culture and personally with the Minister of Culture in Sweden.

== Personal life ==
Eklund lives with her husband and son on the island of Lidingö within the city limits of Stockholm, Sweden.
