= Gula gubben =

Swedish comedian and singer

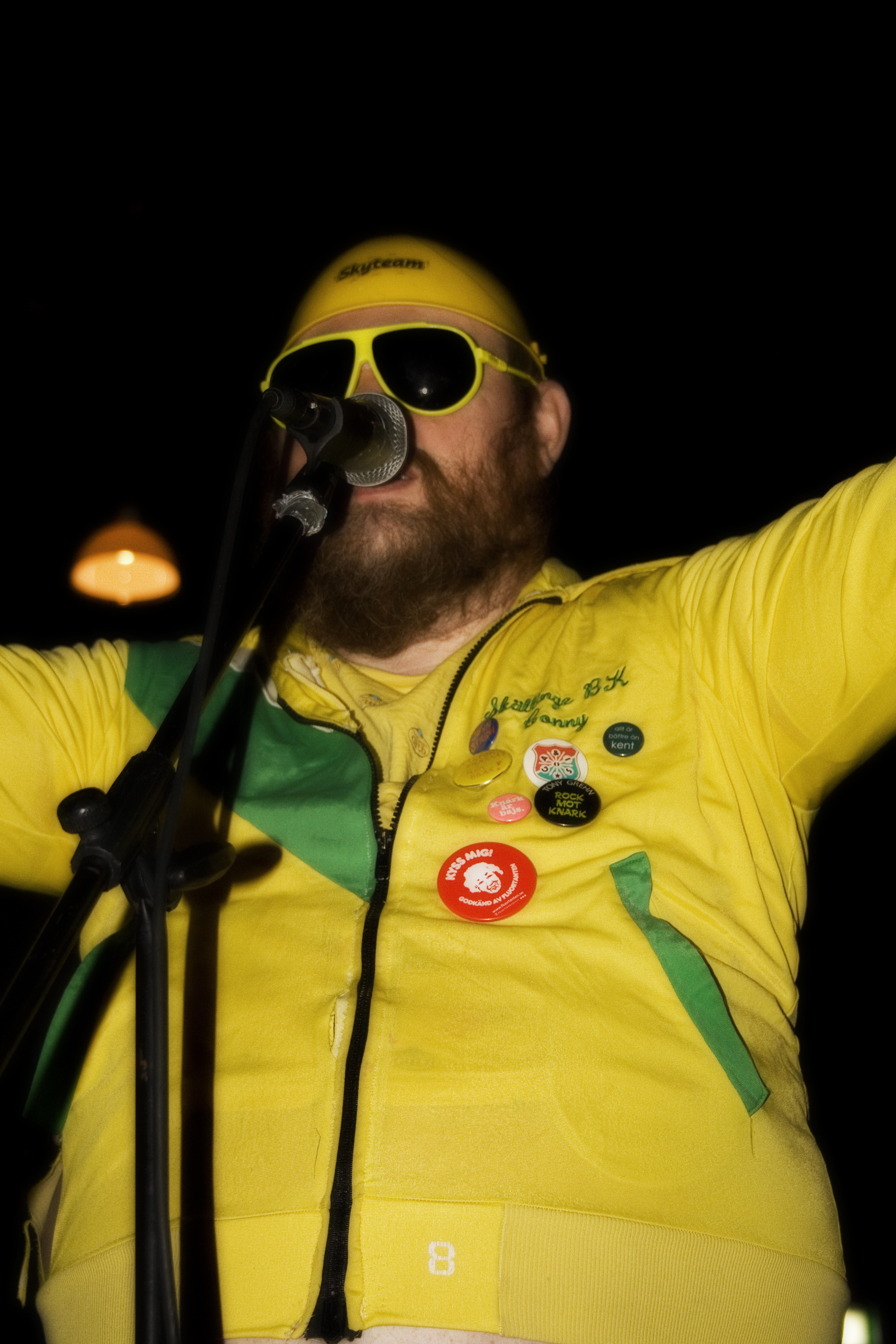
- Gula gubben in Norway (2007)
- Born: Ulf Hans Peter Lööf; 18 February 1958 (age 68); Skövde, Sweden
- Occupations: comedian, singer

Ulf Hans Peter Geta Lööf (born 18 February 1958), better known as Gula gubben ("The yellow fellow"), is a Swedish comedian, singer, and poet. Lööf has competed in the show Talang 2010 on TV4. Lööf has also appeared at festivals and in the SVT show Sommarlovsmorgon during the summer of 2012. Lööf has done DJ work and has owned his own vinyl disc shop in Varberg. Lööf is also a participant in poetry slams.

== Biography ==
Lööf was born in Skövde but lives and works in Varberg, Sweden.

He is best known as "Gula gubben" as he performs in yellow tight fitting tracksuits at different music festivals such as the Hultsfred Festival and the Skövde festival. Lööf commented that he "cried" and that his "soul died" when the Hultsfred Festival was permanently terminated in 2010. Lööf has recorded a few music albums and also written several poetry collections. He has also been a DJ usually playing vinyl discs from his personal collection. He competes in poetry slams and he became champion at the Swedish annual poetry slam competition.

== Television appearances ==
Lööf competed in the show Talang 2010 – the Swedish version of Got Talent – on TV4, but was eliminated after his first audition. He also appeared in Swedish/Scandinavian Wipeout in that same year. During the 2012 series of Sommarlovsmorgon on SVT which ran for nine weeks, Lööf read a poem each week on the show.

== Personal life ==
Along with Bertil Johansson, he owned and ran the shop "Vevgrammofonen" in Varberg which sold vinyl discs, but the shop closed in 1998. In September 2012, Lööf was attacked by a drunk man who had climbed into the residential neighbourhood where Lööf lives. Lööf and another person together held the attacker down until police arrived.
