= Jack Baymoore & the Bandits =

Swedish band

Jack Baymoore & the Bandits was a Swedish rockabilly group established by Jack Baymoore (aka Kent Vikmo), a rock vocalist in 1997. Prior to Jack Baymoore & the Bandits, Baymoore (Vikmo) had another band project Blackout where he had released with them Stop That Clock.

Baymoore has also made a number of tribute projects. Very notably he was in the Johnny Cash tribute band Tennessee Drifters. He also played tribute gigs singing Elvis Presley song and has appeared in a number of rockabilly compilations.

== Members ==
- Jack Baymoore – vocals
- Antti Pihkanen – guitar EX
- Jyrki "JJ" Juvonen – guitar and steel guitar EX
- Jan Larsson – double bass EX
- Tage Pihkanen – drums

== Discography ==
Jack Baymoore & the Bandits

Year	Album	Peak positions	Certification
Year	Album	SWE	Certification
1997	Roarin Down the Track	–	
1999	A-V8 Boogie	–	
1999	Big Boys Rock	–	
2003	Diggin' Out	–	
2003	Let's Drag	8	

Blackout albums

- 1993: Stop That Clock
