= Ulla Persson =

- Born: 1947; Stockholm, Sweden
- Genres: schlager
- Occupation: singer
- Years active: 1960s-

Ulla Persson (born 1947 in Stockholm, Sweden) is a female singer from Sweden scoring successes during the 1960s.

== Svensktoppen songs ==
- Jag bränner dina brev – 1963
- Jag spar mina tårar – 1964

== Filmography ==
- Att älska – 1964
