= Last Amanda =

Swedish rock band

- Origin: Östersund, Sweden
- Genres: Rock, alternative rock, melodic rock, power pop
- Years active: 2000–present
- Label: FEA Records
- Members: Mårten Larsson; Magnus Sandberg; Andreas Magnusson; Peter Limber; Nicholas Oja
- Website: www.lastamanda.com

Last Amanda is a Swedish, Los Angeles and Stockholm based rock band. It was originally formed in the northern Swedish city of Östersund in 2000. Stylewise Last Amanda seem to have a mix of metal and melancholy with influences of classic rock and surf. A little bit of REM, a little bit of Nirvana with a touch of Aerosmith. With powerful yet melodic vocals of singer Mårten Larsson, Last Amanda is attractive to a wide group of listeners. After several trips to New York and Los Angeles the band finally moved to Studio City, Los Angeles in 2003. In 2004 the self-titled debut album was released by new Los Angeles–based indie label, FEA Records.

== Early years ==
After starting up in the early 1990s as the grunge cover band Pearl Band, the band took the name Blackwood when a local studio in 1994 offered them to recorded a mini CD.

After numerous shows over Sweden the band was in 1998 signed by local indie label Tilted Recordings. At the same time they decided to change the name to [[Saltmine. The self-titled debut album contained a raw sound with equal parts from metal, melodic hardcore and grunge. As their style of music, at the time, wasn’t hyped and]] popular amongst music critics the band found it hard breaking through even though outshining most Swedish rock bands at the time.

In the year 2000 a rather new sound emerged as main songwriter and guitarist Andreas Magnusson had started recording and arranging songs with digital sound editing programs. As the recording process became more accessible the songs took a more refined and well laid expression. Instead of the hard hitting guitars the band turned into a more dynamic and melodic rock band with influences as diverse as surf rock guitars, Tool, Mew and metal to classic rock such as R.E.M. and U2.

During the first demos of the new sound, known as the ”Demo 2000” many of the Swedish major labels grew increasingly interested in the band and its potential to attract big audiences. A handful of big record labels such as EMI and Stockholm Records (Universal) showed serious interest in the band. Due to interest from some of the bigger American labels, the band decided not to sign with any Swedish label and instead try their luck on the other side of the Atlantic Ocean.

== US promotional trips ==
In 2002 Last Amanda, or as it was referred to then “Lint” was invited to come over to New York to play before interested US labels. This first week almost landed them a contract with Roadrunner Records after an impressed head of A&R Ron Burman watching almost 10 songs in a rehearsal room close to Madison Square garden, but due to a filled “signing quote” Burman ended up not being able to sign the band after having signed Theory Of A Deadman to his label.

== Relocating to Los Angeles ==
After yet a few trips to the US, Last Amanda finally moved to the American West coast in the summer of 2003. Rapidly they gained a reputation as a live act and kept touring all over California working hard on getting the buzz requested by the many interested major labels.

2004 saw the light of their indie label debut, Last Amanda, on newly started LA label F.E.A Records. Produced by Dave Holdredge, the album was successful with frequent radio airplay on national and college radio.

== Second album : Wide Awake In Movieland ==
Last Amanda's second album, Wide Awake In Movieland, was finalized and mastered in Los Angeles in late 2012.

Last Amanda line up as per February 2010:

Mårten Larsson - Vocals
Andreas Magnusson - Guitars
Magnus Sandberg - Guitars
Nicholas Oja - Bass
Peter Limber - Drums
