= Kill Squad vs. Doubleheader =

Swedish musical duo

Kill Squad vs. Doubleheader was a Swedish electronic musical duo that released two CDs in 1997: Wave Your Hands and At Home EP. Their record label was Superstudio Grå, a division of Diesel Music.

Kill Squad is Daniel Lindeberg, a DJ and live performer who now calls himself "Dumb Dan." Doubleheader is Magnus Häglund, a graphic designer who lives in Visby and published a graphic novel, Vill någon väl, in 1998.
