= Wilhelmina Fundin =

Swedish operatic soprano (1819–1911)

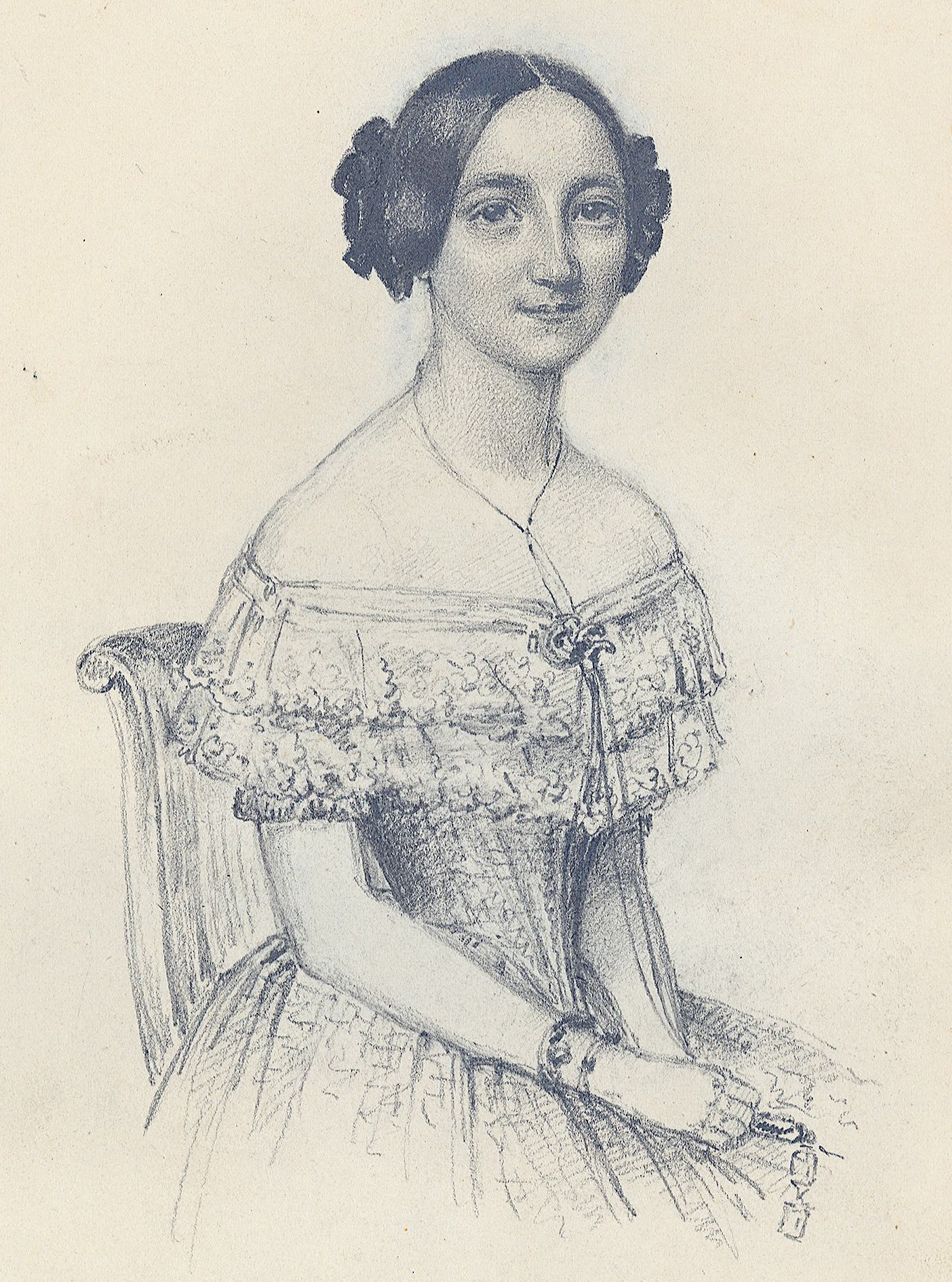
Wilhelmina Fundin (1842), from a sketch by Maria Röhl

Wilhelmina ("Mina") Christina Fundin (12 July 1819 – 28 January 1911) was a Swedish operatic soprano who sang at the Royal Swedish Opera without interruption for 30 years. In the mid-1800s, she was considered to be one of the opera's most talented performers.

== Biography ==
Born on 12 July 1819 in Stockholm, Wilhelmina Fundin was the daughter of the precentor of St Clara's Church, Carl Axel Fundin, and Christina Margaretha Wikström. Her mother managed a boarding home for the students of the Royal Dramatic Training Academy in 1837-47.

Her friend and colleague Jenny Lind met when she was fourteen. She called her "Mina Fundin" and they were cared for by the theatre who had adopted them as contracted apprentices.

After entering the Royal Theatre's school in 1833, she was engaged as an actress and opera singer in 1841. When her friend Jenny Lind was touring abroad and after she left Sweden, Fundin took on her leading roles. She visited Jenny Lind in Germany during Lind's German tour, but despite invitations, she refused to visit her in England because of her fear of sea travel.

As a person, Wilhelmina Fundin was described:

"A warm interest for her art, a diligence worthy of respect, a graceful and pleasing appearance, a lovable personality, and a modest underestimation of her own talent, are the admirable qualities known to be the character of Wilhelmina Fundin."

Among her most appreciated roles were the Queen of the Night in The Magic Flute, Adalgisa in Norma, and Leonora in Alessandro Stradella.

She retired from the stage in 1871.

Wilhelmina Fundin died in Stockholm on 28 January 1911.
