= Johan Fredrik Berwald =

Swedish musician (1787–1861)

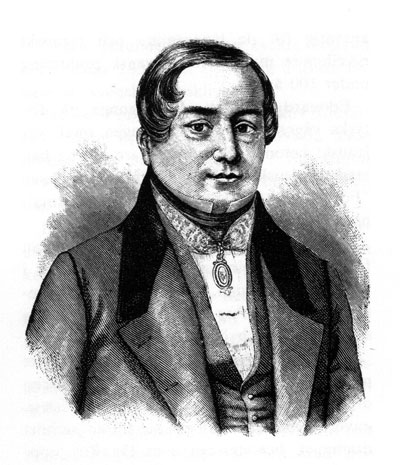
Johan Fredrik Berwald

Johan Fredrik Berwald (4 December 1787 – 26 August 1861) was a Swedish violinist, conductor and composer. He was a cousin of Franz Berwald and August Berwald.

== Biography ==
Berwald appeared as an infant prodigy on violin as early as age six, touring abroad together with his father Georg Johann Abraham Berwald, a bassoon player at the Kungliga Hovkapellet. During four years, starting in 1808, Johan Fredrik Berwald was a soloist at the Royal Chapel in Saint Petersburg. He became a violinist at the Kungliga Hovkapellet in Stockholm in 1814, and conductor of the Royal Orchestra 1823 to 1847. During this time he also led the concerts of the Harmonic Society.

Unlike his cousin Franz Berwald, Johan Fredrik was successful as a musician during his lifetime. The cousins were sometimes rivals, and Johan Fredrik made, as far as is known, no efforts to help Franz have his scenic and symphonic works performed. He was regarded as an average conductor and out of date as a composer, but his introduction of Weber's and Meyerbeer's operas, for instance, was successful, partly because of Jenny Lind's participation.

A couple of divertissements were composed directly for Jenny Lind, for example "En majdag i Värend" (1843) in a kind of nationally and popularly adapted style bearing the stamp of the period. In addition to that he composed orchestral and chamber music together with some vocal music. None of these can be said to be in the concert repertoire of today.

He was married to the royal concert singer Mathilda Cohn. Their daughter Julie Berwald (1822-1877), was for a short time opera singer at the Royal Swedish Opera in Stockholm where she made her debut in 1847, was employed in 1848, and left in 1852 when she married the baron Knut Åkerhjelm.

Berwald was elected as fellow no 228 to the Swedish Royal Academy of Music on 2 December 1818.

== Selected works ==
- L'héroine de l'amour filial Operetta - 1811 Saint Petersburg
- Nya garnisonen Vaudeville 1 act - 8 April 1831 Stockholm, Kungliga Teatern
- Felsheims hussar Vaudeville 3 acts - 10 February 1832 Stockholm, Kungliga Teatern
- Ett national-Divertissement 1 act Böttiger - 6 February 1843 Stockholm, Kungliga. Teatern
- En majdag i Wärend Sångspel 1 act Böttiger - 11 May 1843 Stockholm, Kungliga Teatern
