= Heikki Suolahti =

Finnish composer

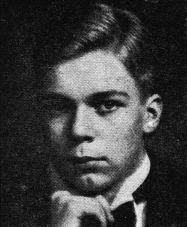

Heikki Theodor Suolahti (2 February 1920 – 27 December 1936) was a Finnish composer.

Suolahti was born and died in Helsinki, where he studied under Arvo Laitinen in Helsinki from 1929 until his death. In 1935, he composed Sinfonia piccola, which was first performed in February 1938 under Tauno Hannikainen. Hannikainen also orchestrated some of Suolahti's songs. Sinfonia piccola was published in the United States in 1959. When the composer died at the age of 16, none of his works had been performed publicly yet. He left the opera Pärttylin yö and a few other works unfinished.

Suolahti, a huge admirer of Richard Wagner, was promised a trip to the Bayreuth Festival in the summer of 1937, but he died soon after Christmas 1936.

Jean Sibelius was fascinated with Sinfonia piccola and praised it to Suolahti's mother after the composer's untimely death.

== Works ==
The following works are largely unpublished, but are archived at the Helsinki University Library.

=== Orchestral ===
- Symphony no.1 in b minor (sinfonia piccola h-molli) (1935)
- Prélude pour petit orchestre dédié à mon père, Op.6
- Fantasia-Impromptu, Op.9 (1932)
- Hades, Op.10 Symphonic poem (1932)

=== Concerto ===
- Piano concerto no.1, Op.15 (1934)
- Violin concerto, Op.16 (1934)

=== Chamber music ===
- String Quartet (1936)
- String Quartet No.1, Op.4 (Quartetto piccola)
- String Quartet No.2, Op.8 (1933)
- Piano Quintet

=== Violin and piano ===
- Valsette, Op.7, no.3
- Novelette, Op.7
- Pastorale (1933)
- Three small pieces, Op.24 (1934) Prélude, sérénade, romance
- Fantasia
- Serenade

=== Piano ===
- Two small pieces, Op.5, no.1-2 (1933) Rêverie, Sur l'Onde
- Romance
- Sonatine and Rondo

=== Voice ===
- Hyökyaalto for voice, piano and orchestra (lyrics by V.A.Koskenniemi)
- Unten kalastaja for voice, piano and orchestra (Lyrics by Einari Vuorela)
- Kesäyössä for voice, piano and orchestra (lyrics by V.A.Koskenniemi)
- Endymion for voice and piano (lyrics by V.A.Koskenniemi)
- Huomisehtoo for voice and piano (lyrics by V.A.Koskenniemi)

=== Opera ===
- Pärttylin yö (incomplete)
