= Fredrika Stenhammar =

Swedish opera singer (1836-1880)

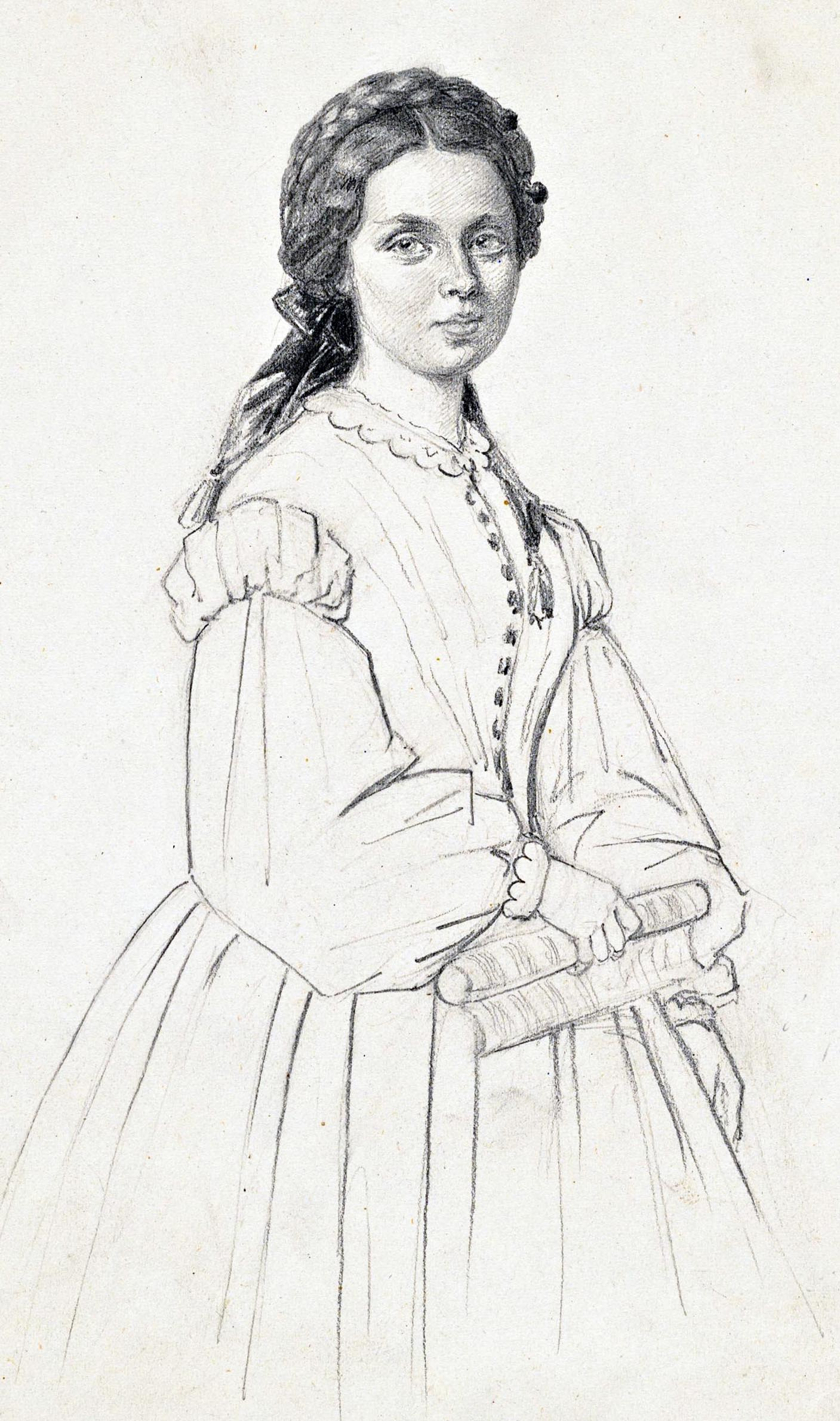
- Fredrika Andrée Stenhammar-by Maria Röhl.
- Born: Fredrika Andrée; 19 September 1836; Visby, Sweden
- Died: 7 October 1880 (aged 44)
- Occupation: Operatic soprano
- Spouse: Oskar Fredrik Stenhammar
- Relatives: Andreas Andrée (father); Elfrida Andrée (sister)

Fredrika Stenhammar (née Andrée; 19 September 1836 – 7 October 1880) was a Swedish soprano opera singer. Stenhammar sang at the opera in Vienna in 1859, and then returned to Sweden where she was a prima donna, and taught singing at the Royal Swedish Opera. She was considered one of Sweden's most outstanding singers in the 1860s and 1870s. She was inducted to the Royal Swedish Academy of Music. She was the sister of Sweden's first female organist, Elfrida Andrée, and was married to an opera singer.

== Life ==
She was born in Visby as Fredrika Andrée, the daughter of doctor Andreas Andrée, and was sister of composer and Sweden's first female organist, Elfrida Andrée. She first learned music from her father, and then from cathedral organist Wilhelm Söhrling. Stenhammar was a student at the Conservatory in Leipzig in 1851–54, where she studied singing with Madame Schäfer. She was employed at the Hofoper in Dessau in 1854–55, and at the Royal Swedish Opera in 1855–57. Her debut Swedish performance was as Lady Harriet in Friedrich von Flotow’s opera Martha. She was a student of Gilbert Duprez in 1857–58 and sang at the opera in Vienna in 1859. When she returned to Sweden she became a prima donna and a singing instructor of the Royal Swedish Opera. Stenhammar had a repertoire of 40 to 50 roles, and sang coloratura roles but was best suited to lyrical singing. She was considered one of Sweden's most outstanding singers in the 1860s and 1870s.

She was inducted into the Royal Swedish Academy of Music in 1864, and was awarded a Litteris et Artibus medal in 1876. She married the opera singer Oskar Fredrik Stenhammar (1834–1884), whose opera career was short after his voice was damaged, leading him to work as a customs officer.

Stenhammar died in 1880, aged 44, and is buried in the Northern Cemetery in Solna.
