= Wilhelmina Strandberg =

Swedish operatic mezzo-soprano (1845–1914)

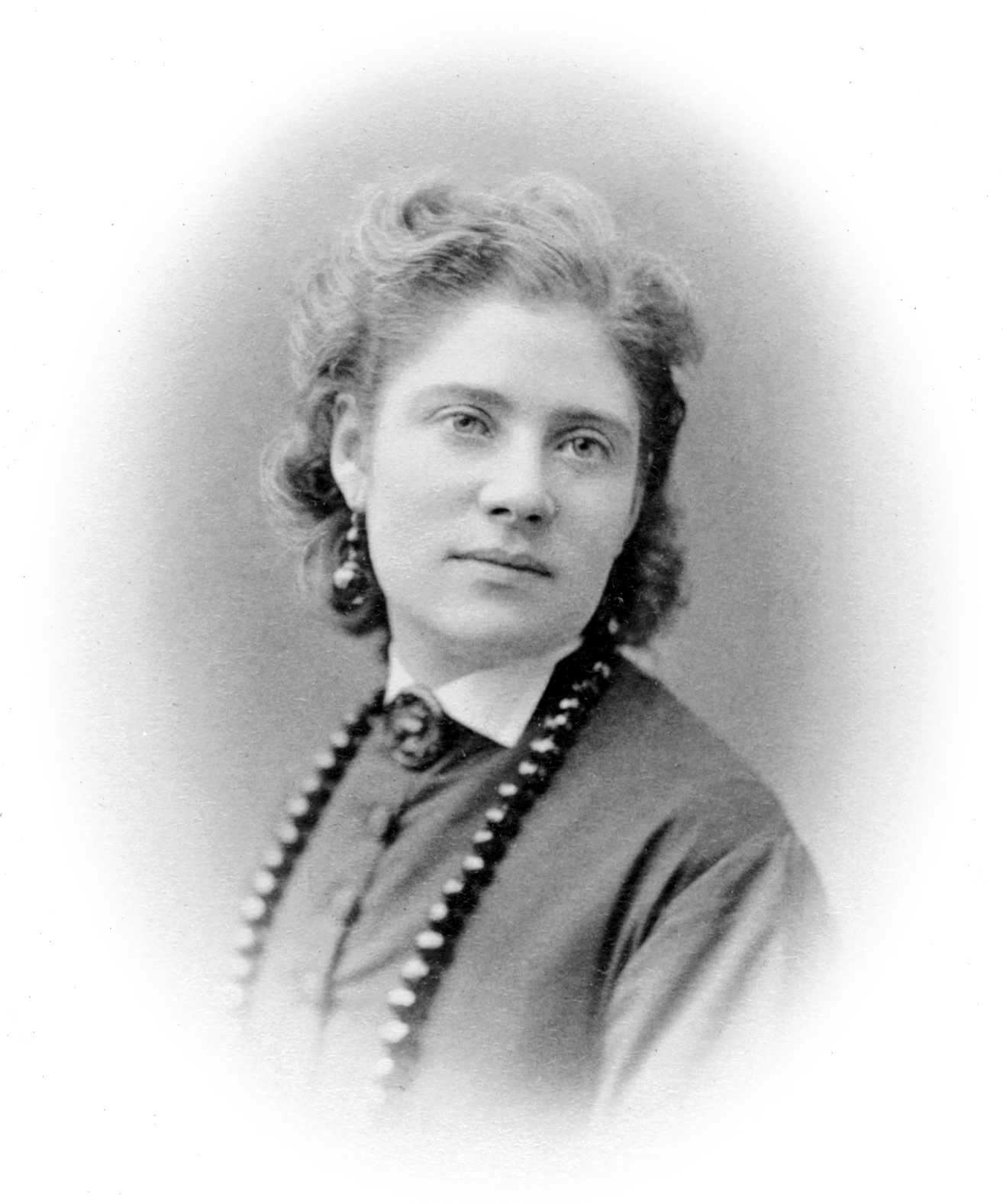
- Strandberg in 1872
- Born: Wilhelmina Söhling; September 6, 1845; Stockholm, Sweden
- Died: October 16, 1914 (aged 69); Stockholm, Sweden
- Occupation: Mezzo-soprano
- Years active: 1867–1903

Maria Wilhelmina Strandberg née Söhrling (6 November 1845 –16 October 1914) was a Swedish operatic mezzo-soprano who performed at the Royal Theatre in Stockholm from 1867 to 1903, mainly in soubrette roles.

== Biography ==
Born in Stockholm, Wilhelmina Söhling was the daughter of the music teacher and organist Wilhelm Söhrling (1822–1901) and Marie Elise Vretman. After being brought up in a musical family, she studied solo singing from 1862 to 1865 at the Swedish Conservatory under Julius Günther, Isak Berg and Fredrika Stenhammar. She made her début at the Royal Theatre on 18 October 1867 as Jeannette in Nicolas Isouard's comic opera Joconde.

In the spring of 1868, she was engaged by the Royal Theatre, playing further soubrette roles in comic operas including Vattendragaren and Les rendez-vous bourgeois. She soon moved on to more classical roles such as Zerlina Don Giovanni and Cherubino in The Marriage of Figaro. Other roles included Micaëla in Carmen, Magdalena in the Swedish première of Die Meistersinger von Nürnberg, Marta in Faust and Pamina in The Magic Flute.

On 18 October 1892, when she appeared as the Marquise in La fille du régiment, celebrating the 25th anniversary of the Royal Opera, she was awarded the Litteris et Artibus medal. She retired from the Royal Opera on 6 November 1903. She continued to live in Stockholm where she died on 16 October 1914.

== Personal life ==
In 1878, she married customs official Olof Strandberg (1847-1889), son of opera singer (tenor), Olof Strandberg (1816-1882) and actress Aurora Vilhelmina Strandberg.
