= Maria Gelhaar =

Swedish opera singer

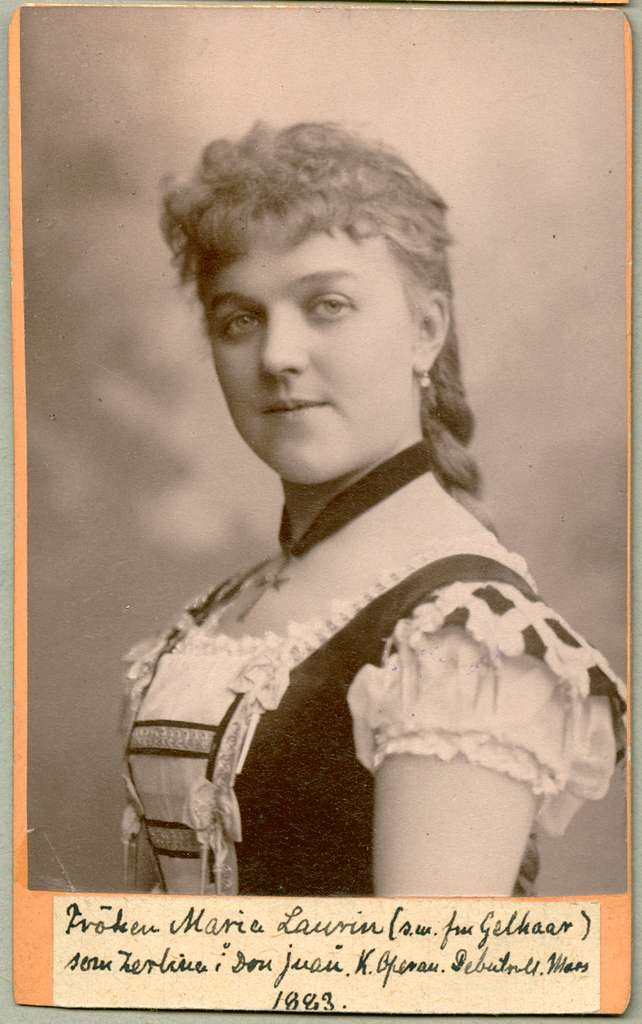
Maria Gelhaar as Zerlina in Don Giovanni (1883)

Maria Albertina Gelhaar née Laurin (1858-1920) was a Swedish operatic soprano. She made her debut in September 1881 at Stockholm's Nya Teatern in Mozart's one-act opera Der Schauspieldirektor. In February 1883, she appeared for the first time at the Royal Swedish Opera as Zerlina in Mozart's Don Giovanni. Engaged by the company until 1888, her roles included Fiametta in Franz von Suppé's Boccaccio, Papagena in Mozart's The Magic Flute and Mercedes in Bizet's Carmen.

== Biography ==
Born in Stockholm on 4 August 1858, Maria Albertina Laurin was the daughter of the clock factory owner Carl Fredrik Laurin and his first wife Henriette née Moberg. She studied voice under Wilhelmina Gelhaar and from 1876 to 1889 under Julius Günther at the Royal Swedish Conservatory. In 1886, she married Stockholm's postmaster, Tom Otto Wilhelm Gelhaar, with whom she had a daughter, the opera singer Signe Gelhaar-Bågo.

In September 1882, she made her debut at Stockholm's Nya Teater as Silvia in Mozart's Der Schauspieldirektor and went on to take the role of Fiametta in Franz von Suppé's Boccaccio and that of Maritana in Jules Massenet's comic opera Don César de Bazan. On 13 February 1883, she appeared for the first time at the Royal Swedish Opera as Zerlina in Don Giovanni. The following April she performed the role of Papagena in Mozart's The Magic Flute and in September appeared Verdi's Un giorno di regno. Engaged by the company from 1883 to 1888, roles included Marcedes in Carmen, Zobeide in Daniel Auber's Le maçon and Angelina in Luigi Cherubini's Les deux journées.

Maria Gelhaar died in Stockholm in 1920.
