= Zeigeist =

Swedish band and art constellation

- Origin: Stockholm, Sweden
- Genres: Electropop, synthpop
- Years active: 2006–2009
- Labels: Spegel, Imperial
- Past members: Per Störby, Maria Nordström, Mattias Brunn, Nicklas Hultman, Andreas Sundqvist

Zeigeist were a Swedish electronic music band and art constellation, formed 2006 and split up 2009. They started as a collective of several artists, musicians and designers and created the art'ntainment concept. Their debut album The Jade Motel was released in Sweden on 30 April 2008, reaching number fifty-three on the Swedish Albums Chart. They were by then only three members: Pearl, Princess and Mattias. Zeigeist were characterized as an electropop band with remarkable performances and shows, with a clash of music and art performance.

They made special clothes, often big haute-couture-like dresses and used effects like fake blood, make-up, confetti, and various stage designs. Among their special shows was the one at the Swedish Arvikafestivalen 2007, where they made a dystopian performance in three acts with short novel films, produced only for this show, in between the acts. They made extraordinary photo shoots, like the studio photo with Princess surrounded in feathers and Pearl with paint dripping on his chest.

They had several hits, with the best known "Tar Heart" being named as one of the smartest marketing ideas during the Myspace era, when it was erroneously tagged on an early leak of The Knife's 2006 album Silent Shout under the name "F as in Knife", and became a big mystery until it was explained that it actually was a Zeigeist song named "Tar Heart". Pitchfork Media placed the leaked demo of "Tar Heart" at number sixty on their list of "The Top 100 Tracks of 2006".

In the same time as they declared their all-of-a-sudden split-up, their final single, a cover of Roxette's debut single "Neverending Love" (1986), was released on 18 February 2009 as a digital EP containing their own song "Chasing Your Shadows All Around the World" and The Twelves remix of "Humanitarianism" as B-sides. The split up was explained, as so many other fictive and dramatic things by Zeigeist, with a "termination" on their website that they had their personal reasons to "kill her".

The musical part of Zeigeist was made by Pearl, who nowadays runs his solo project Pearl Fiction.

== Discography ==
=== Studio album ===
- The Jade Motel (2008)

=== Singles ===
- "Black Milk" (2007)
- "Bunny"/"Humanitarianism" (2008)
- "Wrecked Metal" (2008)
- "Wrecked Metal" (The Cello Version) (2008)
- "Cuffs" (2008)
- "Neverending Love" (2009)
