= Mathilda Berwald =

Finnish-Swedish singer (1798–1877)

Mathilda Charlotta Berwald, née Cohn (9 March 1798 – 3 May 1887, was a Finnish and Swedish concert singer. She was later appointed official singer (Hovsångare) of the Swedish royal court.

She was born in Helsinki in Finland, and married the Swedish concert musician Johan Fredrik Berwald in 1817. She toured with her husband and performed as a singer at his concerts. She educated her three daughters Fredrique, Julie Mathilda and Hedvig Eleonora as singers. She performed with her husband and Fredrique at the Opera in Berlin for Spontini, and then for the Royal Danish family, in 1833. In 1834, she was given the title of first singer of the royal Swedish court. They toured in Finland (1842), Denmark (1844) and had a great success in Berlin (1847). She died in Stockholm).

== See also ==
- Lovisa Augusti
