= Julie Berwald =

Swedish opera singer (1822–1877)

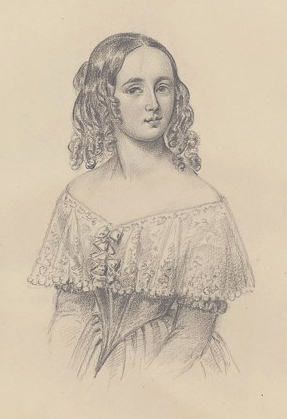
- Julie Berwald by Maria Röhl.
- Born: Julie Mathilda Berwald; 14 October 1822; Stockholm, Sweden
- Died: 1 January 1877 (aged 54)
- Occupation: Operatic soprano

Julie Mathilda Berwald (14 October 1822 – 1 January 1877) was a Swedish concert and opera singer.

Julie Berwald was born in Stockholm to the concert singer Mathilda Berwald and the musician Johan Fredrik Berwald. She and her sisters Fredrique and Hedvig Eleonora were trained as singers by their mother, and performed with her at their fathers public concerts. They toured as concert singers in Finland (1842), Copenhagen (1844) and Berlin (1847). The three siblings were a popular singing trio.

Between 1847 and 1852, she was engaged as an opera singer at the Royal Swedish Opera in Stockholm; from 1848 contracted as a 'Premier Actress'. During her years at the Opera, she became one of the greatest stars of the Swedish opera. In 1851, she also performed in Copenhagen to great acclaim.

Nils Arfwidsson said about her:

"... daughter of the royal orchestra conductor by the same name and fostered within the theatre, she gained fame as a society singer already as quite young. In the late 1840s she decided to perform on stage, where she became the most noted person displayed on the operatic stage after Lind and prior to Michal. Julia Bervald had a beautiful figure, a well shaped though somewhat lifeless face, a pleasant manner. Her by nature beautiful soprano had been much trained, and there was much correctness, much grace in her performance although, as with her entire being, something cool and sober. She was not very good, or at least not very spectacular, in glowing tragic parts, but there was also here grace, softness and a certain intensity in her performance. "

In 1852, she married Baron Georg Gustaf Knut Åkerhielm and retired from the stage. Her marriage met with no resistance from the nobility, indicating a change in attitude towards singers and actresses, who were long looked down upon socially.

Julie Berwald was elected to the Royal Swedish Academy of Music, as member no. 337 on 16 December 1853.
