= The Fallen Empires =

Swedish indie rock band

- Origin: Malmö, Sweden
- Genres: Indie rock Garage rock revival Alternative rock
- Years active: 2006–present
- Labels: unsigned
- Members: Toby; Nate; Sal
- Website: www.thefallenempires.com

The Fallen Empires are a Swedish indie rock band from Malmö and southern Sweden. Their sound is very much based on guitars and the German entertainment magazine Prinz described their music as “authentic rock'n'roll ...with smokey riffs and heavy rhythmic beats", somewhat similar to Oasis, The Hives, The Raconteurs and Black Rebel Motorcycle Club.

== History ==
The band was founded in 2006 by singer/guitarist Toby and bassist Nate and now also consists of drummer Sal. When playing live the band has been featured by numerous different guitarists. The first album called As of Yet… was released in 2008. The band has played many concerts in Sweden including a concert at Sweden's oldest music festival Tullakrok. The band has also performed on Swedish television. In 2009 the band was on tour in Germany and Sweden. In 2010 the band is playing England, and releasing a new album in December. For spring 2011 a big European tour is according to rumours going to take place.

== Discography ==
- As of Yet... (album) (2008)
- Dragonfly (EP) (2010)
- Enjoy Your Lot (to be released, album) (2011)
