= Symphony No. 4 (Berwald) =

Orchestral work by Franz Berwald

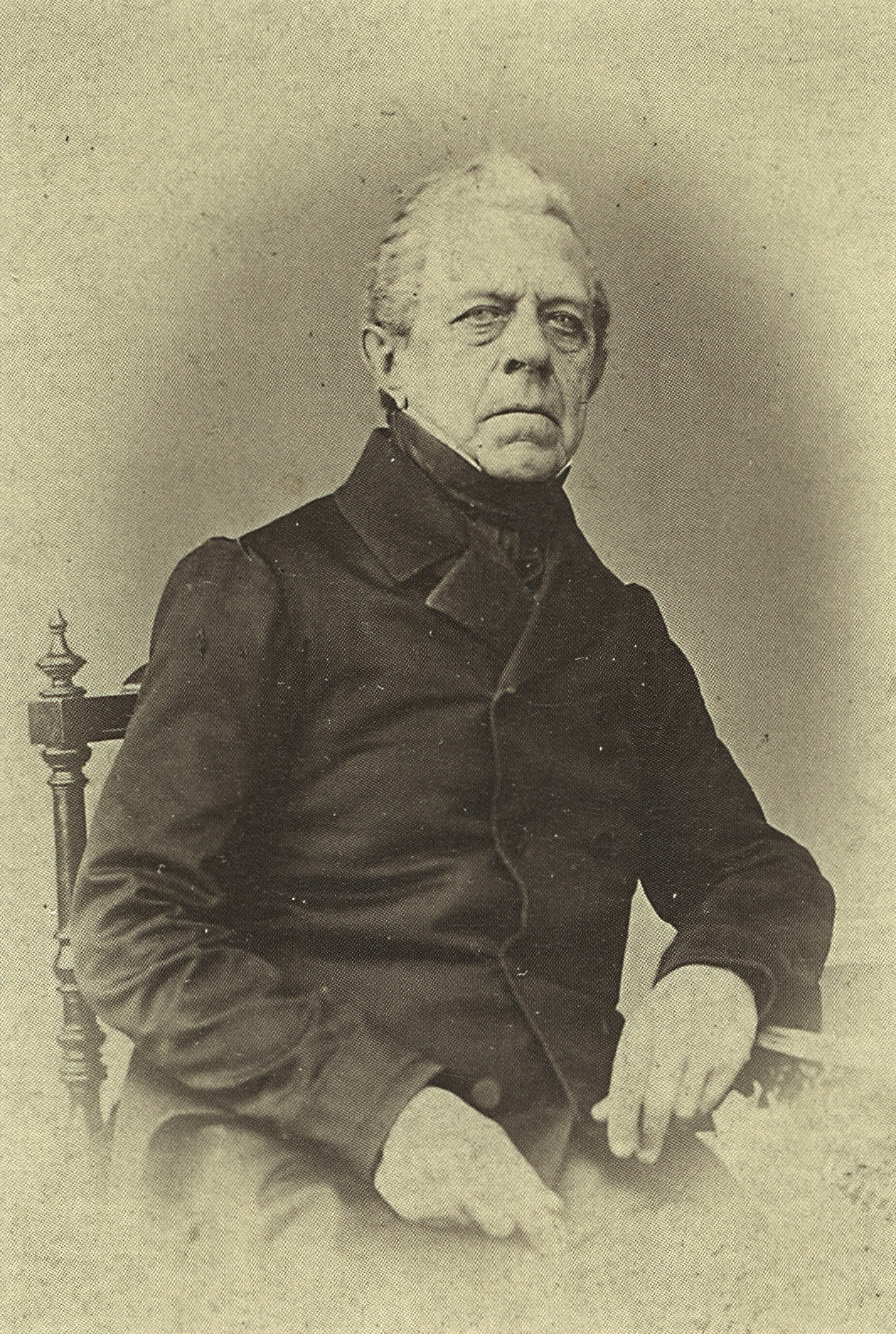
Franz Berwald c. 1860

Symphony No. 4 in E♭ major is an orchestral work by Swedish composer Franz Berwald written in 1845. Berwald considered naming the symphony "Sinfonie naïve" but the autograph score is simply inscribed "No. 4 in E flat". Berwald attempted to interest French composer/conductor Daniel Auber in premiering the symphony but it had to wait until April 9, 1878 (ten years after the composer's death) when it was finally given a first performance under Berwald champion Ludvig Norman.

The first published score refers to the work as the composer's 3rd symphony.

== Music ==
The symphony is scored for 2 flutes, 2 oboes, 2 clarinets, 2 bassoons, 4 horns, 2 trumpets, 3 trombones, timpani, and strings.

It consists of four movements:

1. Allegro risoluto
2. Adagio -
3. Scherzo. Allegro molto
4. Finale. Allegro vivace

A typical performance lasts 25–30 minutes.

The slow movement is based on an unpublished keyboard work of 1844, En landtlig bröllopfest (A Rustic Wedding).

== Discography ==
- Naxos Records - Helsingborg Symphony Orchestra conducted by Okko Kamu (with Symphony No. 3 and the Piano Concerto)
- Decca Records - San Francisco Symphony Orchestra conducted by Herbert Blomstedt (with Symphony No. 1)
- Arte Nova - Jena Philharmonic conducted by David Montgomery (complete set of all four Berwald symphonies)
- BIS - Malmö Symphony Orchestra conducted by Sixten Ehrling (complete set of all four Berwald symphonies)
- Deutsche Grammophon - Gothenburg Symphony Orchestra conducted by Neeme Järvi (complete set of all four Berwald symphonies)
- Hyperion - Swedish Radio Symphony Orchestra conducted by Roy Goodman (complete set of all four Berwald symphonies plus the fragment of a Symphony in A from 1800 and the overtures to the operas Estrella de Soria and Drottningen av Golconda)
- Warner Classics - Royal Philharmonic Orchestra conducted by Ulf Björlin (complete set of all four Berwald symphonies plus short orchestral works)
