= Symphony No. 1 (Berwald) =

Orchestral work by Franz Berwald

Symphony No. 1 in G minor, "Sérieuse", is an orchestral work by Swedish composer Franz Berwald. It was premiered on December 2, 1842 in a concert at the Royal Opera, Stockholm given by the Swedish Royal Court Orchestra conducted by the composer's cousin Johan Fredrik Berwald. This first performance was not a success, leading to this symphony being the only one of Berwald's mature symphonies to be performed during his lifetime. Although the symphony is numbered 1, Berwald had previously written a Symphony in A in 1820, which only survives in fragmentary form, but in 1829 he disowned all of his previous output with the exception of the Serenade for tenor and chamber ensemble (1825) and the Septet in B flat (1828)).

The symphony is scored for 2 flutes, 2 oboes, 2 clarinets, 2 bassoons, 4 horns, 2 trumpets, 3 trombones, timpani and strings. It consists of four movements:

1. Allegro con energia
2. Adagio maestoso
3. Stretto
4. Finale. Adagio – Allegro molto

A typical performance lasts approximately 30 minutes.

The movements follow the typical structure of Romantic symphonies of the period. The first movement is in sonata form with a lyrical second subject and ending in the major. The second, slow movement is in ternary form. The third movement is a scherzo, also in ternary form with fast outer sections in triple meter and a more serene central section. The finale commences with a slow introduction which reprises material from the second movement before leading into another sonata form Allegro.

== Discography ==
- Naxos Records - Helsingborg Symphony Orchestra conducted by Okko Kamu (with Symphony No. 2 and the overture to the opera Estrella de Soria)
- Chandos Records - Danish National Symphony Orchestra conducted by Thomas Dausgaard (with Symphony No. 2 and the symphonic poem Erinnerung an die Norwegischen Alpen)
- Decca Records - San Francisco Symphony Orchestra conducted by Herbert Blomstedt (with Symphony No. 4)
- Arte Nova - Jena Philharmonic conducted by David Montgomery (complete set of all four Berwald symphonies)
- BIS - Malmö Symphony Orchestra conducted by Sixten Ehrling (complete set of all four Berwald symphonies)
- Deutsche Grammophon - Gothenburg Symphony Orchestra conducted by Neeme Järvi (complete set of all four Berwald symphonies)
- Hyperion - Swedish Radio Symphony Orchestra conducted by Roy Goodman (complete set of all four Berwald symphonies plus the fragment of a Symphony in A from 1800 and the overtures to the operas Estrella de Soria and Drottningen av Golconda)
- Warner Classics - Royal Philharmonic Orchestra conducted by Ulf Björlin (complete set of all four Berwald symphonies plus short orchestral works)
- Discophilia - Stockholm's Konsertförenings Orkester conducted by Fritz Busch (four rehearsals, a final rehearsal and a performance)
