= Symphony No. 2 (Berwald) =

Franz Berwald completed the Symphony No. 2 in D major, "Capricieuse", on June 18, 1842, in Nyköping. The original score has been lost since the 1850s. In 1909, the Franz Berwald Foundation commissioned Ernst Ellberg to reconstruct the score from 4-stave sketches containing indications for orchestration. Ellberg's reconstruction was published in 1913 and first performed on January 9, 1914. Towards the end of the century, Nils Castegren reviewed Ellberg's reconstruction and published an "urtext" for Bärenreiter.

Ellberg's reconstruction calls for 2 flutes, 2 oboes, 2 clarinets, 2 bassoons, 4 horns, 2 trumpets, tenor trombone, 2 bass trombones, timpani and strings. While Berwald gave clear indications for the woodwinds and strings, such as "detailed notations ... indicating when certain wind instruments play in unison with the respective string parts or in a different octave," where he wanted brass and/or timpani, Berwald would merely write the names of the instruments. However, Berwald did indicate the tuning and register of the brass and timpani at the beginning of each movement.

The work is in three movements:

1. Allegro
2. Andante
3. Allegro assai

and lasts about 29 and a half minutes per Berwald's indications of duration (from which metronome markings could be extrapolated).

== Discography ==
- Naxos Records - Helsingborg Symphony Orchestra conducted by Okko Kamu (with Symphony No. 1 and the overture to the opera Estrella de Soria)
- Chandos Records - Danish National Symphony Orchestra conducted by Thomas Dausgaard (with Symphony No. 1 and the symphonic poem Erinnerung an die Norwegischen Alpen)
- Arte Nova - Jena Philharmonic conducted by David Montgomery (complete set of all four Berwald symphonies)
- BIS - Malmö Symphony Orchestra conducted by Sixten Ehrling (complete set of all four Berwald symphonies)
- Deutsche Grammophon - Gothenburg Symphony Orchestra conducted by Neeme Järvi (complete set of all four Berwald symphonies)
- Hyperion - Swedish Radio Symphony Orchestra conducted by Roy Goodman (complete set of all four Berwald symphonies plus the fragment of a Symphony in A from 1820 and the overtures to the operas Estrella de Soria and Drottningen av Golconda)
- Warner Classics - Royal Philharmonic Orchestra conducted by Ulf Björlin (complete set of all four Berwald symphonies plus short orchestral works)
