= I enter a monastery =

Jag går i kloster (I enter a monastery) (Note: This is the English translation offered by Grove. The relevant volume in the Bärenreiter complete Berwald edition gives I'll Enter a Convent.) is a two-act operetta by Franz Berwald, to a libretto by the composer and Herman Sätherberg.

== Background ==
A farce, Rendez-vous, or the ridiculous rivals (Rendez-vouet, eller De löjliga rivalerna) was seen in Stockholm in May 1822; the rivals being a dandy, a doctor and a poet. Berwald’s libretto, which he wrote himself, changes the professions but is hampered by the plot’s lack of dramatic interest. The narrative offers only the chance for a number of attractive solos and ensembles. (Note: Andersson and the Swedish National Biography give only Berwald as librettist, without Sätherberg) Andersson detects in Berwald’s score a classical touch reminiscent of Mozart, d'Alayrac and Méhul.

== Performance history ==
Composition was begun during a six-month stay in Nyköping in 1842, and although excerpts were played at a concert at the Stora Börssalen (Great Hall of the Exchange), Stockholm in December 1842, the operetta was first performed complete at the Royal Swedish Opera, Stockholm on 2 December 1843 on the same evening as Berwald’s Sinfonie sérieuse, and had five performances in that run. Jenny Lind sang the main role in the first performances, and the cast also included the bass Fredrik Kinmanson and the tenor Olof Strandberg, but has had very few performances since.

The opera was recorded by Swedish Radio in 1961 with a cast consisting of Stina-Britta Melander (soprano), Erik Saedén (bass-baritone), Erik Sundquist (baritone), Arne Andersson (tenor), Paul Höglund (bass) and the Radioorkestern (Swedish Radio Symphony Orchestra) and Radiokören (Swedish Radio choir) conducted by Stig Rybrant. This was re-broadcast in 2012. The overture was recorded by the Royal Stockholm Opera orchestra, conducted by Stig Westerberg in the 1980s.

A full score was published in 2007 as volume 19 of a complete Berwald edition from Bärenreiter

== Synopsis ==
The first scene is set in the park of the greedy fortune-seeking lawyer Clermont (bass), guardian of the beautiful Julie (soprano). A handsome officer, Sansdoute (baritone), a childhood friend of the heroine, and his valet (bass) jump over the wall into the grounds to find Julie. The greedy Clermont comes out of the house grasping Julie's arm as if it was made of gold. The young heiress Julie may inherit her father’s estate on condition that she marries when she comes of age, but if not she will have to enter a convent. Soon another suitor enters, the mediocre poet, Charles (tenor), a comic figure. The object of the three men's ardour, Julie picks a flower and finds a note from Sansdoute. In a duet Julie spurns Charles.

The second act takes place in front of the convent's gate and nuns can be heard singing their evening song. The men enter. Sansdoute is disguised as a monk and discourages Julie from her path by pointing out how stupid it would be for her to enter a convent. He wins her over, and the two other men must be content with the outcome - Clermont prepares the marriage contract with favourable financial terms and Charles creates an ode for the ceremony.

== Notes and references ==
Notes

Citations
