= Symphony No. 3 (Berwald) =

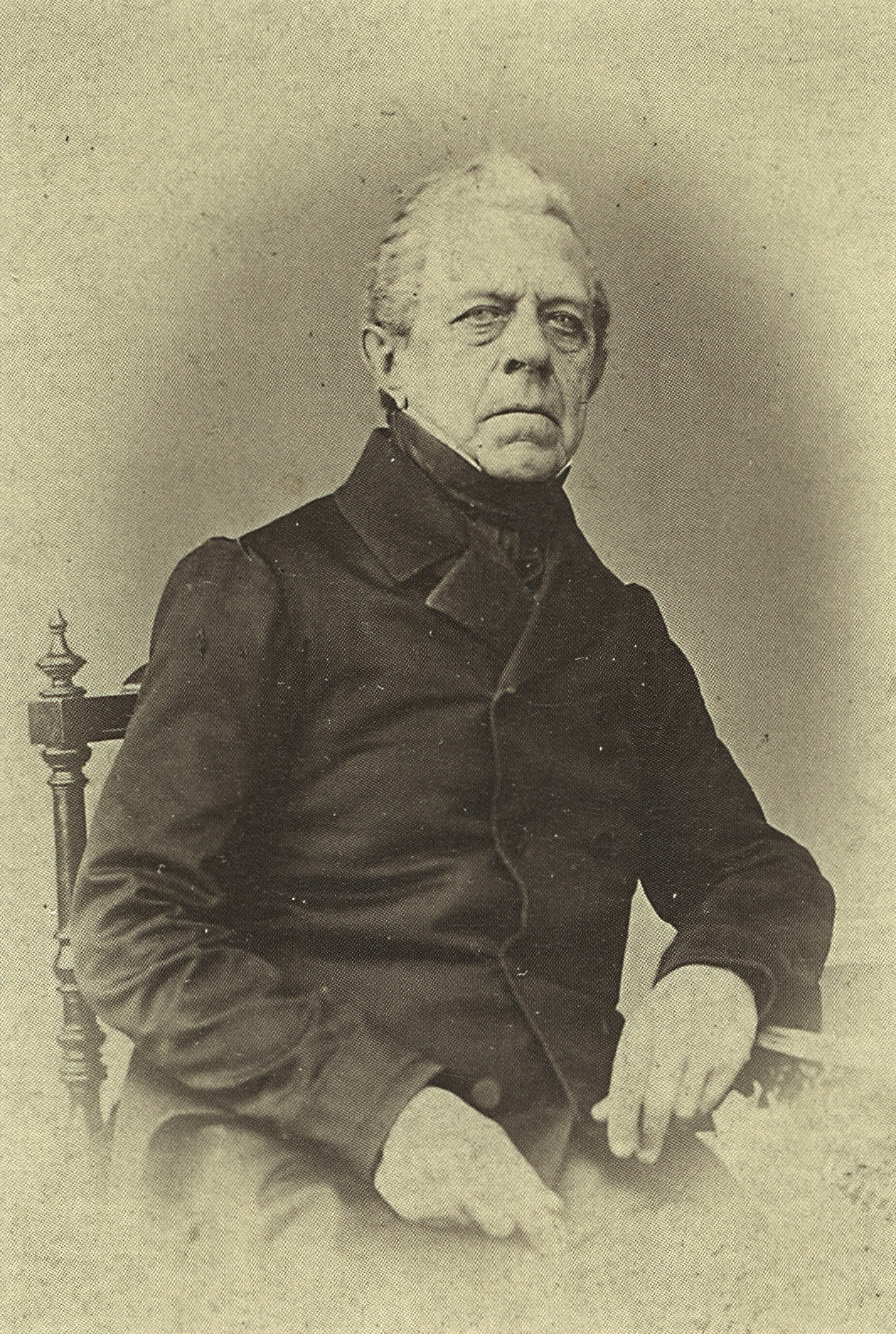
Franz Berwald c. 1860

The Symphony No. 3 in C major of the Swedish composer Franz Berwald, nicknamed the Singulière, was written in 1845. It is scored for 2 flutes, 2 oboes, 2 clarinets, 2 bassoons, 4 horns, 2 trumpets, 3 trombones, timpani and strings.

It is about a half-hour in length and is in three movements:

1. Allegro fuocoso in C major
2. Adagio – Scherzo (Allegro assai) – Adagio (in G major)
3. Finale: Presto in C minor (ends in C major)

The autograph was bought by the Stockholm Academy of Music in the 1870s. The work was not premiered until 37 years after the death of the composer. The first performance took place on January 10, 1905 in Stockholm under the baton of Tor Aulin.

== Selected Recordings ==
- Tor Mann with the Radiotjänsts Symfoniorkester, 1938 on Radiotjänst 78s.
- Igor Markevitch with the Berlin Philharmonic Orchestra, 1956 on Deutsche Grammophon (reissued on Deutsche Grammophon CD).
- Sixten Ehrling with the London Symphony Orchestra, 1968 on Decca (reissued on Bluebell CD).
- Neeme Järvi with the Goteborg Symphony Orchestra, 1985 on Deutsche Grammophon CDs.
- Hans Schmidt-Isserstedt with the Stockholm Philharmonic Orchestra, 1985 on Musidisc/Accord.
- Esa-Pekka Salonen with the Swedish Radio Symphony Orchestra, 1991 on Musica Sveciae MSCD 531.
- Ivor Bolton with the Royal Philharmonic Orchestra, 1994 on Royal Philharmonic Masterworks B002JPELMC.
- Okko Kamu with the Helsingborg Symphony Orchestra, 1995 on Naxos 8.553052.
- Roy Goodman with the Swedish Radio Symphony Orchestra, 1996 on Hyperion CDA67081/2.
- Sixten Ehrling with the Malmö Symphony Orchestra, 1996 on BIS Records CD 795/6.
- Ulf Björlin with the Royal Philharmonic Orchestra, 1976, reissued 1999 on EMI Classics Double Fforte 73335.
- Thomas Dausgaard with the Danish National Radio Symphony Orchestra, 2008 on Brilliant Classics 93699.
