= Stig Westerberg =

Swedish conductor (1918–1999)

Stig Evald Börje Westerberg (26 November 1918 – 1 July 1999) was a Swedish conductor and pianist, whose career was based mostly in his home country.

== Biography ==
Born in Malmö, Stig Westerberg studied Royal Academy of Music in Stockholm from 1937 to 1942, with Melchior Melchers for theory and Tor Mann for conducting. After the Second World War, he also studied in Paris with Paul Kletzki.

He was a repetiteur at the Royal Swedish Opera from 1943 to 1946, also making he debut conducting the Swedish Radio Symphony Orchestra 1946. Other positions held during this time were Conductor of the Oscarsteatern from 1947 to 1948, and Musical Director of Gävle Symphony Orchestra from 1949 to 1953, and conductor at the Royal Swedish Opera from 1953 to 1957. For 25 years, Westerberg conducted the Swedish Radio Symphony Orchestra – from 1958 to 1983 and raised the standard of the ensemble to international level. He championed Swedish composers such as Hugo Alfvén, Kurt Atterberg, Allan Pettersson and Wilhelm Stenhammar alongside the core repertoire.

From 1978 to 1985, he was chief conductor of the Malmö Symphony Orchestra.

Westerberg premiered over 80 works and left a major legacy of broadcasts and of recordings on the BIS, Caprice, Sterling and Swedish Society labels.

Westerberg died in Lidingö.

== Recordings ==
Westerberg's discography consists of many 19th and 20th-century Swedish orchestral works, including Förklädd Gud by Larsson with Lars Ekborg, Elisabeth Söderström and Erik Saedén, as well as some opera records, such as Aniara and Estrella de Soria. Radio recordings included Elgar, Grieg and Offenbach.

Cultural offices
Preceded by Janos Fürst	Chief Conductor, Malmö Symphony Orchestra; 1978–1985	Succeeded by Vernon Handley
