= Nils Grevillius =

Swedish conductor and violinist

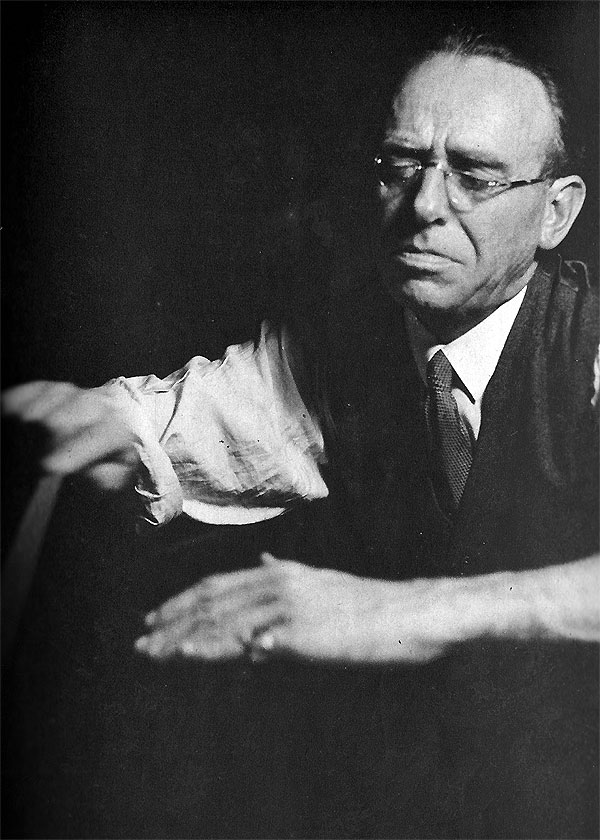
Grevillius (1941)

Nils Grevillius (7 March 1893, Stockholm – 15 August 1970, Mariefred, Sweden) was a Swedish conductor and violinist.

Grevillius studied at the Royal College of Music, Stockholm. He served as leader of the Royal Swedish Opera orchestra from 1911 to 1914. He then became a repetiteur at the Royal Swedish Opera in 1916. He was a regular conductor with the Stockholms Konsertförening (Stockholm Concert Association) from 1914 to 1920. He later held the title of first conductor at the Royal Swedish Opera and conducted regularly there from 1922 to 1953. From 1927 to 1939, he was principal conductor of the Radioorkestern of Sveriges Radio (Swedish Radio). He was awarded the Latvian Order of the Three Stars 4th Class on 16 May 1935.

Grevillius' name became well-known in the United States and Great Britain primarily from his recorded collaborations with Swedish tenor Jussi Björling. Their work together began in 1929, at Björling's first contracted commercial recording sessions, for Skandinavska Grammophon, which Grevillius conducted. The Björling-Grevillius recordings were issued by RCA Victor in the US and EMI/His Master's Voice in the UK.

Nils Grevillius the musician should not be confused with his cousin, Nils Grevillius (B. 1963), a private detective and author, who is a resident of Pasadena, California.
