= Symphony No. 3 (Larsson) =

Symphony in four movements by Lars-Erik Larsson

- by Lars-Erik Larsson
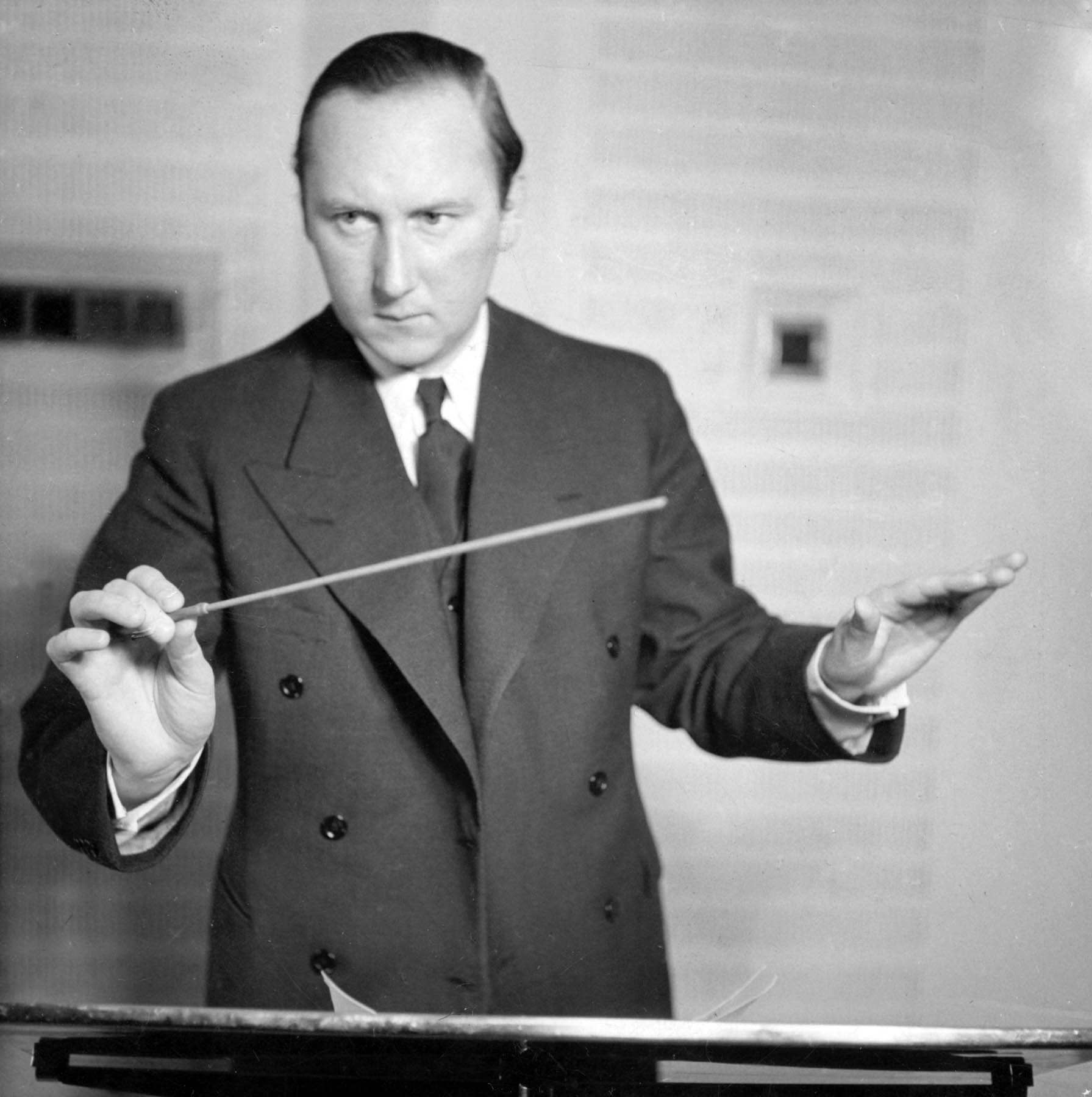
- The composer
- Opus: 34
- Composed: 1944–1945
- Publisher: Unpublished
- Duration: Approx. 34 minutes
- Movements: 4

Premiere
- Date: 10 February 1946
- Location: Stockholm, Sweden
- Conductor: Tor Mann
- Performers: Stockholm Concert Society Orchestra

The Symphony No. 3 in C minor, Op. 34, is a four-movement orchestral composition written from 1944 to 1945 by the Swedish composer Lars-Erik Larsson. The piece premiered in Stockholm on 10 February 1946 with Tor Mann conducting the Concert Society Orchestra. In response to unfavorable critical reviews, Larsson immediately withdrew the symphony after its premiere—a fate that, too, had earlier befallen his First (Op. 2, 1928) and Second (Op. 17, 1937) symphonies. (Reflecting, in a 1948 interview, on his penchant for self-criticism, Larsson explained that he was more talented at the smaller, less-structured forms and described his symphonies unsympathetically: "In [them] I have said nothing special. Other people have said much better ... [they] belong in my opinion to [my] process of development".)

Nevertheless, he repurposed the finale—with a new introduction—as the Concert Overture No. 3 (Konsertouverture Nr. 3). In 1973, however, the Swedish conductor Sten Frykberg successfully revived the Symphony No. 2, an event which convinced Larsson that he had been too harsh a critic of his symphonic works. As a result, Larsson permitted Frykberg and the Royal Stockholm Philharmonic Orchestra to perform the Third in August 1975 over Swedish Radio.

== Structure ==
The Third Symphony is in four movements. They are as follows:

1. Allegro con brio
2. Adagio ma non troppo
3. Prestissimo—Trio. Andante—Scherzo da capo
4. Andante maestoso—Allegro molto

Although Gehrmans Musikförlag published the Concert Overture No. 3 (Movement IV), Larsson's Symphony No. 3 remains unpublished; apparently, the manuscript is—according to the BIS records liner notes from its 1989 release—under the copyright-collecting auspices of the Swedish Performing Rights Society (STIM).

== Recordings ==
The sortable table below lists commercially available recordings of the Symphony No. 3:

Conductor	Orchestra	Rec. (Note: Refers to the year in which the performers recorded the work; this may not be the same as the year in which the recording was first released to the general public.)	Time	Recording venue	Label	Ref.
Sten Frykberg	Helsingborg Symphony Orchestra (1)	1978	33:06	Helsingborg Concert Hall	BIS	(Note: S. Frykberg–BIS (CD–96) 1989)
Andrew Manze	Helsingborg Symphony Orchestra (2)	2011	35:44	Helsingborg Concert Hall	cpo	(Note: A. Manze–cpo (777 673–2) 2018)

== Notes, references, and sources ==
Notes

Sources

- Schlüren, Christoph (2015). Lars-Erik Larsson: Symphony No. 3 / Three Orchestra Pieces / Adagio, Op. 48 / Musica permutatio, Op. 66 (CD booklet). Translated by Robinson, J. Bradford. Andrew Manze & Helsingborg Symphony Orchestra. cpo. p. 12–17. 777 673–2. OCLC 1054982167
- Skans, Per (1989a). Lars-Erik Larsson: Förklädd Gud (God in Disguise), Op. 24 / Symphony No. 3 in C minor, Op. 34 (CD booklet). Sten Frykberg & Helsingborg Symphony Orchestra. BIS. p. 2–4. CD–96. OCLC 21568279
- Skans, Per (1989b). Lars-Erik Larsson: Symphony No. 1 in D major, Op. 2 / Symphony No. 2, Op. 17 (CD booklet). Hans-Peter Frank & Helsingborg Symphony Orchestra. BIS. p. 3–4. CD–426. OCLC 25048091
