= The Dressmaker (opera) =

Modehandlerskan (The Modiste or The Dressmaker) is a three-act operetta by Franz Berwald, to a libretto by the composer and others.

The piece was written in Elfvik in 1843. Excerpts were first performed at the Royal Swedish Opera, Stockholm on 26 March 1845 (described by New Grove as 'a fiasco'), with a vocal score being published that year.

The overture was recorded for CD in 1995 by the St Petersburg Hermitage Orchestra conducted by Mats Liljefors.
