= Symphony No. 2 (Larsson) =

Symphony in three movements by Lars-Erik Larsson

- by Lars-Erik Larsson
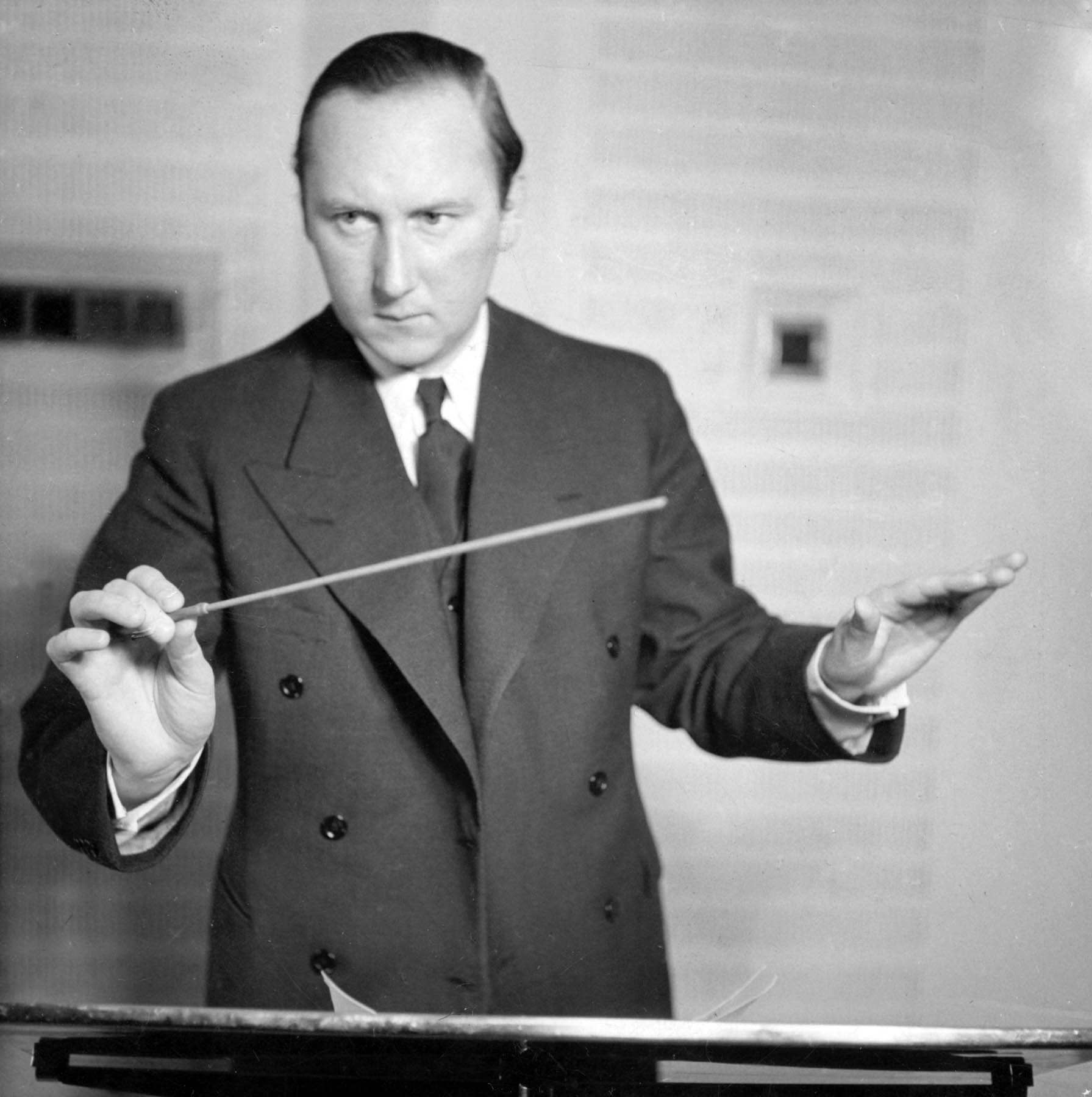
- The composer
- Opus: 17
- Composed: 1936–1937
- Publisher: Unpublished
- Duration: Approx. 34 minutes
- Movements: 3

Premiere
- Date: 24 November 1937
- Location: Stockholm, Sweden
- Conductor: Lars-Erik Larsson
- Performers: Stockholm Concert Society Orchestra

The Symphony No. 2 in E minor, Op. 17, is a three-movement orchestral composition written from 1936 to 1937 by the Swedish composer Lars-Erik Larsson. The piece premiered in Stockholm on 24 November 1937 with Larsson conducting the Concert Society Orchestra. In response to unfavorable critical reviews, Larsson immediately withdrew the symphony after its premiere—a fate that, too, had earlier befallen his First (Op. 2, 1928) and would later befall his Third (Op. 34, 1945) symphonies. (Reflecting, in a 1948 interview, on his penchant for self-criticism, Larsson explained that he was more talented at the smaller, less-structured forms and described his symphonies unsympathetically: "In [them] I have said nothing special. Other people have said much better ... [they] belong in my opinion to [my] process of development".)

Nevertheless, he repurposed the finale as an independent work entitled Ostinato. In this form, the finale was re-premiered on 1 April 1939 at the International Society for Contemporary Music (ISCM) World Music Days in Warsaw and became subsequently one of Larsson's most successful works for orchestra. In 1973, however, the Swedish conductor Sten Frykberg successfully revived the complete Symphony No. 2 over Swedish Radio, an event which convinced Larsson that he had been too harsh a critic of his symphonic works and caused him in 1975 to permit a revival the Symphony No. 3.

== Structure ==
The Second Symphony is in three movements. They are as follows:

1. Allegro con moto—Allegro molto vivace
2. Andante—Allegro alla marcia—Andante—Molto tranquillo
3. Ostinato. Moderato—Prestissimo–Lento

Although Gehrmans Musikförlag published Ostinato (Movement IV), Larsson's Symphony No. 2 remains unpublished; apparently, the manuscript is—according to the BIS records liner notes from its 1989 release—under the copyright-collecting auspices of the Swedish Performing Rights Society (STIM).

== Recordings ==
The sortable table below lists commercially available recordings of the Symphony No. 2:

Conductor	Orchestra	Rec. (Note: Refers to the year in which the performers recorded the work; this may not be the same as the year in which the recording was first released to the general public.)	Time	Recording venue	Label	Ref.
Hans-Peter Frank	Helsingborg Symphony Orchestra (1)	1988	35:36	Helsingborg Concert Hall	BIS	(Note: H. Frank–BIS (CD–426) 1989)
Andrew Manze	Helsingborg Symphony Orchestra (2)	2011	34:17	Helsingborg Concert Hall	cpo	(Note: A. Manze–cpo (777 672–2) 2015)

== Notes, references, and sources ==
Notes

Sources

- Schlüren, Christoph (2015). Lars-Erik Larsson: Symphony No. 2 / Variations, Op. 50 / Barococo Suite, Op. 64 (CD booklet). Translated by Robinson, J. Bradford. Andrew Manze & Helsingborg Symphony Orchestra. cpo. p. 14–20. 777 672–2. OCLC 965545444
- Skans, Per (1989). Lars-Erik Larsson: Symphony No. 1 in D major, Op. 2 / Symphony No. 2, Op. 17 (CD booklet). Hans-Peter Frank & Helsingborg Symphony Orchestra. BIS. p. 3–4. CD–426. OCLC 25048091
