= Hilda Thegerström =

Swedish pianist, teacher and composer

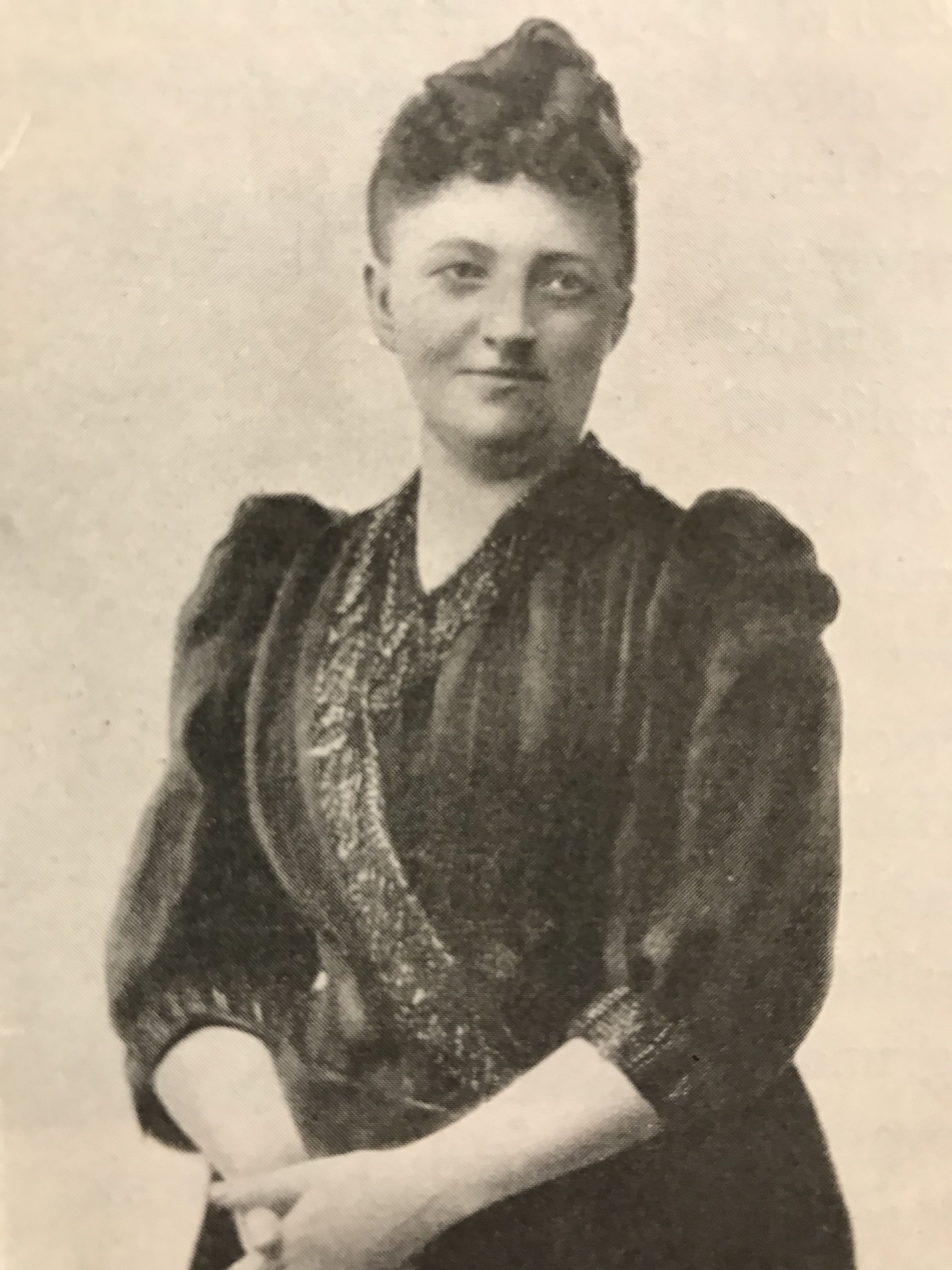
Hilda Thegerström

Hilda Aurora Thegerström (1838–1907) was a Swedish pianist, music teacher and composer in the second half of the 19th century. Thanks to training under Franz Berwald, in April 1856 she was able to perform Chopin's Concerto in F-minor accompanied by the Royal Swedish Orchestra. After further training under Franz Liszt, from 1859 she gave concerts in Weimar, Munich and Leipzig before returning to perform in Sweden. She later became the principal piano teacher at the Royal Swedish Academy of Music where she remained for 32 years.

== Biography ==
Born in Stockholm on 17 September 1838, Hilda Aurora Thegerström was the daughter of the grocer Johan Thegerström and his wife Anna Fredrika Charlotta née Hammarqvist. The second child in the family, she had two brothers. Brought up in Solna, she began studying the piano at the school run by Adolf Fredrik Lindblad after which she received lessons from the Dutch pianist Jan von Boom. But it was not until 1852 when she came under the wing of Franz Berwald that she really progressed. By the time she was 18, she was able to perform movements of Chopin's Second Piano Concerto and Beethoven's Appassionata Sonata as well as a fantasy by Liszt.

Encouraged by Berwald, Thegerström also composed two piano pieces: La naïveté op 1 and Nocturne et Rondoletto op 2. Berwald had them published together in Leipzig in 1857 as Souvenirs Suédois. They were reviewed quite positively by C. Petersen in Neue Zeitschrift für Musik (April 1860).

In 1857, thanks to a grant, Thegerström went to Paris where she spent a couple of months studying under Antoine-François Marmontel and giving concerts. She then moved on to Weimar where she remained for two years studying with Liszt. She gave concerts in Weimar and Munich and at the Tonkünstler Festival in Leipzig in June 1859 where she performed a duo with the cellist Friedrich Grützmacher.

On returning to Stockholm in February 1860, she performed with the singer Christina Nilsson. Thanks to the development of the railways, she was also able to give concerts in Gothenburg, where in November 1860 she performed Mendelsohn's Piano Concerto in G minor. She returned to Germany in 1865, performing in Munich to considerable acclaim. She also received praise for a second concert in Munich in 1867.

In 1872, Thegerström replaced Jan von Boom as principal piano teacher at the Royal Conservatory, after which she gave few public concerts. She taught for 32 years, retiring in 1904 suffering from cancer.

Hilda Thergerström died in Stockholm on 6 December 1907.

== Awards ==
In 1875, Thegerström became a member of the Royal Swedish Academy of Music. In 1895, she received the Litteris et Artibus for her contributions to the arts.
