= Astrid Berwald =

Swedish pianist and piano teacher

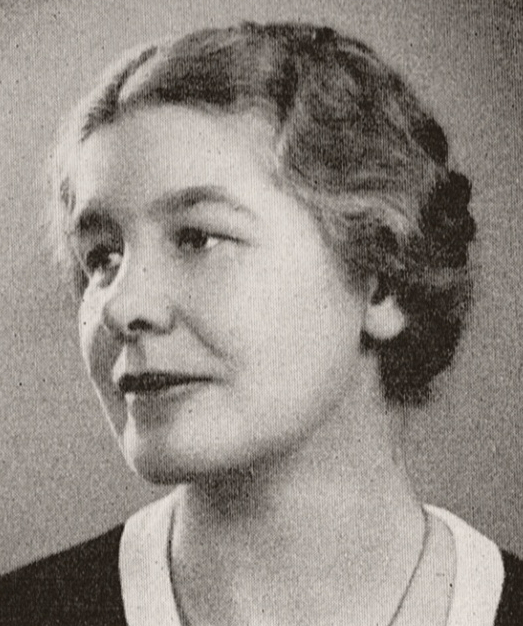
Astrid Berwald

Astrid Maria Beatrice Berwald (8 September 1886, Stockholm — 16 January 1982, Shanxi, China) was a Swedish pianist and piano teacher. While she performed in concerts from time to time, she is remembered first and foremost as a teacher at Richard Andersson's music school, which she headed from 1935. She also devoted considerable efforts to promoting knowledge of the music composed by her grandfather Franz Berwald.

== Early life and education ==
Born on 8 September 1886 in Stockholm, Astrid Maria Beatrice Berwald was the daughter of the composer Hjalmar Berwald and his wife Thora née Bagge. She was the youngest of the family's four children. She attended Richard Andersson's music school (1895–1908) but also studied counterpoint for two years under Ernst Ellberg at the Royal Swedish Academy of Music. During her first study trip to the Hochschule für Musik (College of Music) in Berlin (1908–1911), she studied piano under Ernst von Dohnányi and theory under Paul Juon. She returned to Berlin in 1920 for a second study trip, studying piano under Georg Bertram (1882–1941) at the Stern Conservatory.

== Career ==
Berwald made her official debut at a concert in Gothenburg in 1907. She taught at Andersson's school from 1905 becoming its head teacher in 1918 and the school's director in 1935 until her retirement in 1964.

She is also remembered for performing chamber music around the country with the Berwald Trio which she founded in 1935. Together with Lottie Andreason (violin) and Carin de Frumerie (cello), she frequently played pieces by her grandfather Franz Berwald, sometimes as radio broadcasts. She was keen to provide support for his music and make more widely appreciated.

Astrid Berwald died on 16 January 1982 in Shacheng, She Xian Hebei, China.

== Awards and recognition ==
In March 1935, Berwald was elected as a member of the Royal Swedish Academy of Music.
