= The Queen of Golconda =

Opera by Franz Berwald

Drottningen av Golconda
- Opera by Franz Berwald
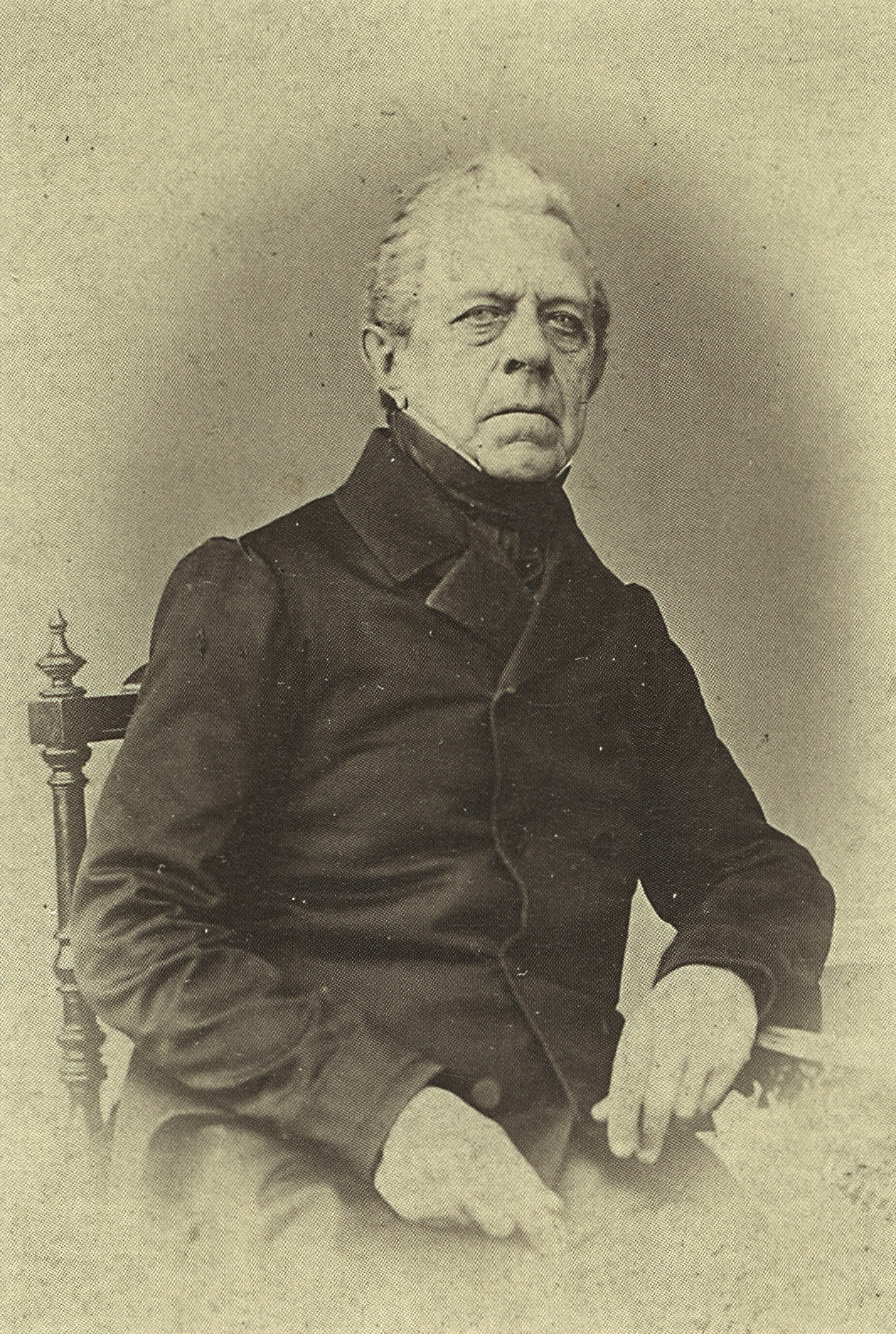
- Berwald c. 1860
- Translation: The Queen of Golconda
- Librettist: Berwald
- Language: Swedish
- Based on: Libretto by Jean-Baptiste-Charles Vial and Edmond de Favières intended for Henri-Montan Berton
- Premiere: 3 April 1968; Royal Swedish Opera, Stockholm

Drottningen av Golconda (The Queen of Golconda) is a three-act romantic opera by Franz Berwald, begun in 1863. The libretto was adapted by the composer from one by Jean-Baptiste-Charles Vial and Edmond de Favières, Aline, reine de Golconde (1803), intended for Henri-Montan Berton; this had been based on another opera of the same name (1766) by Michel-Jean Sedaine for Pierre-Alexandre Monsigny. Berwald may have known the Berton opera from when he played in the opera orchestra in Stockholm. Boieldieu's 1804 opera of the same name and Donizetti's Alina, regina di Golconda (1828) are based on the same material.

== Background ==
The work is the culmination of a project Berwald commenced in 1863 as Lochleven Castle, (based on The Abbot by Walter Scott). This was considerably revised for a potential production the composer hoped for at the Théâtre Lyrique in Paris starring Christina Nilsson. The opera was not seen during Berwald's lifetime, and first staged at the Royal Swedish Opera in Stockholm on 3 April 1968.

The attractive overture may be a later version of the tone poem Humorous Capriccio (1841) from Berwald's Viennese years; it has occasionally been recorded.

== Roles and role creators ==
Roles, voice types, premiere cast
Role	Voice type	Cast of first stage production, 3 April 1968 Conductor: Stig Westerberg
Drottning Aline	soprano	Elisabeth Söderström
Zelie, lady-in-waiting	soprano	Birgit Nordin
Saint Phar, French ambassador	baritone	Erik Saedén
Sadomar, Prime minister	baritone	Rolf Jupither
Nadir, Queen's guard	tenor	Sven Olof Eliasson
Abdala, marshal	baritone	Carl-Axel Hallgren
Kaleb	tenor	Sven Erik Vikström
Osmin, judge of the court	baritone	Paul Höglund

== Synopsis ==
The story concerns the widowed Queen of Golconda, Aline, who as a girl in Provence had loved Saint Phar. However, she was abducted as a child and sold as a slave to the old King of Golconda who then married her. Saint Phar has recently appeared at court as the new French ambassador. The veiled Aline is not recognised by Saint Phar who delivers to her a friendship treaty with France. At a later meeting in the French gardens where Aline comes in Provençal attire, it emerges that he is still in love with her. Aline and her court are held prisoner during a revolution led by Sadomar, but she is rescued by Saint Phar, to whom she finally reveals her face.

== Sources ==
- Forbes, Elizabeth. "Drottningen av Golconda". In: The New Grove Dictionary of Opera, Macmillan, London and New York, 1997.
