= Ludvig Norman =

Swedish composer, conductor and pianist (1831–1885)

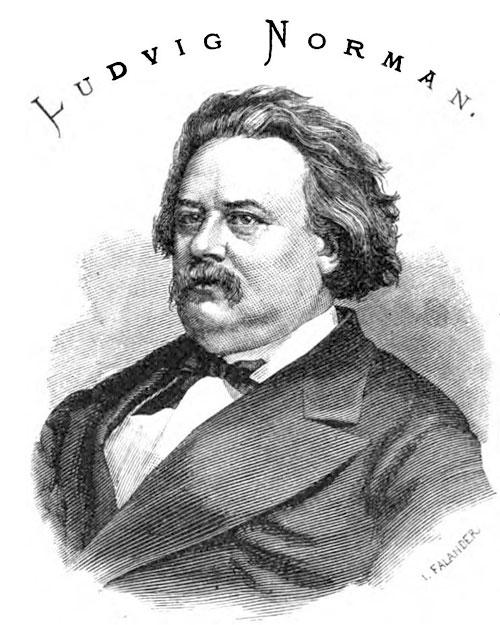
Ludvig Norman

Ludvig Norman (28 August 1831 – 28 March 1885) was a Swedish composer, conductor, pianist, and music teacher. Together with Franz Berwald and Adolf Fredrik Lindblad, he ranks among the most important Swedish symphonists of the 19th century.

Norman was born Fredrik Vilhelm Ludvig Norman in Stockholm.

Norman began his musical training with Lindblad and later studied at the Leipzig Conservatory from 1848 to 1852, where he also made the acquaintance of Robert Schumann. Starting in 1857, he taught at the Royal Music Academy of Stockholm. In 1860, he became the conductor of the Nya harmoniska sällskapet and obtained the post of Kapellmeister at the Royal Swedish Opera the following year. After 1881, he conducted the choral concerts of the Musikvorenigen. He was married to the noted violinist Wilma Neruda in 1864. Their son Ludwig Norman-Neruda was a famous alpinist.

As conductor, he is remembered for premiering Franz Berwald's fourth symphony on 9 April 1878.

Norman composed in a wide variety of genres, including four symphonies, four overtures, four sets of incidental music for plays, cantatas, and chamber music, as well as a great number of lieder and songs for choir.

He was the dedicatee of Woldemar Bargiel's octet for strings.

His pupils included Elfrida Andrée.

Ludvig Norman died in 1885 in Stockholm.

== Selected works ==
Orchestra

- Symphony No. 1 in F Major, Op. 22 (1857)
- Symphony No. 2 in E♭ Major, Op. 40 (1871)
- Symphony No. 3 in D Minor, Op. 58 (1881)
- Concert Overture in E♭ Major, Op. 21 (1856)
- Funeral March, 'To the Memory of August Söderman', Op. 46 (1876)
- Overture to Shakespeare's Antony and Cleopatra, Op. 57 (1881)
- Festive Overture in C Major, Op. 60 (1882)
- Concertstück for Piano and Orchestra, Op. 54 (rev.1880)

Chamber music

- Piano Trio No. 1 in D, Op. 4 (1849, pub. 1853)
- Piano Trio No. 2 in B minor, Op. 38
- "5 Tonbilder im Zusammenhange" for violin and piano, Op.6 (1851, publ 1854)
- Sonata for Violin and Piano in D minor, Op. 3 (1848, pub. 1852)
- Piano Quartet in E Minor, Op. 10
- String Sextet in A major, Op. 18
- Sextet for Piano and Strings in A minor, Op. 29
- Sonata in G Minor for Viola and Piano, Op. 32
- String Octet in C Major, Op. 30
- Sonata in D Major for Cello and Piano, Op. 28
- String Quartet No. 1 in E♭ Major (1848)
- String Quartet No. 2 in E Major, Op. 20 (1855)(published 1882)
- String Quartet No. 4 in D Minor, Op. 24 (1858)
- String Quartet No. 5(?) in C Major, Op. 41/42 (begun 1871, finished 1883)
- String Quartet No. 6 in A Minor, Op. 65 (1884, pub. 1887)
- String Quintet in C Minor, Op. 35
