= Symphony No. 1 (Larsson) =

Symphony in four movements by Lars-Erik Larsson

- by Lars-Erik Larsson
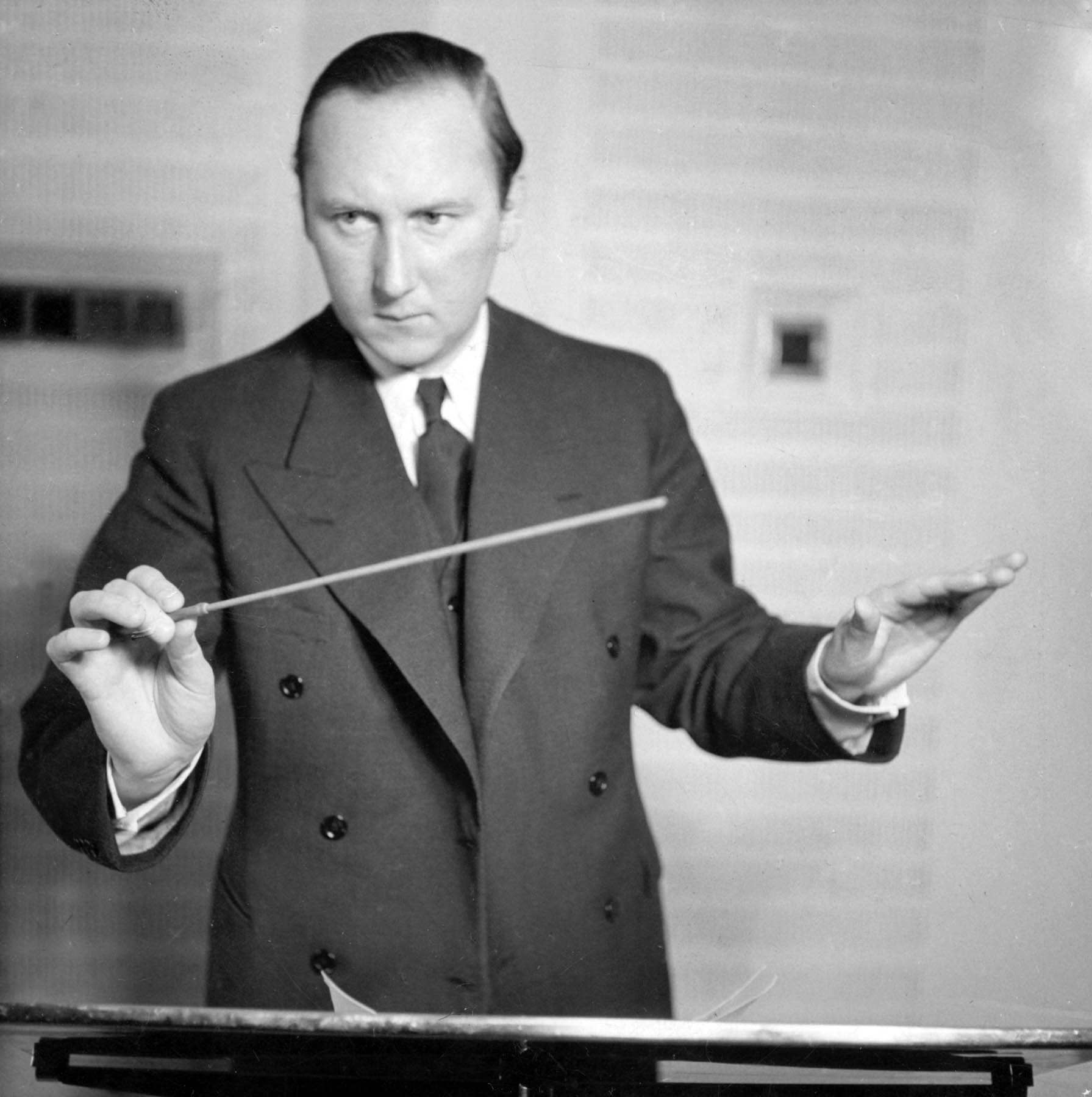
- The composer
- Opus: 2
- Composed: 1927–1928
- Publisher: Unpublished
- Duration: Approx. 30 minutes
- Movements: 4

Premiere
- Date: 27 April 1929
- Location: Stockholm, Sweden
- Conductor: Lars-Erik Larsson
- Performers: Conservatory orchestra, Royal Swedish Academy of Music

The Symphony No. 1 in D major, Op. 2, is a four-movement orchestral composition written from 1927 to 1928 by the Swedish composer Lars-Erik Larsson. A student piece, the symphony marked the conclusion of Larsson's composition studies at the Royal Swedish Academy of Music, at which he had matriculated in 1925.

The work premiered in Stockholm on 27 April 1929 with Larsson conducting the conservatory orchestra. In response to mixed critical reviews, Larsson immediately withdrew the symphony after its premiere—a fate that, too, would later befall his Second (Op. 17, 1937) and Third (Op. 34, 1945) symphonies. (Reflecting, in a 1948 interview, on his penchant for self-criticism, Larsson explained that he was more talented at smaller, less-structured forms and described his symphonies unsympathetically: "In [them] I have said nothing special. Other people have said much better ... [they] belong in my opinion to [my] process of development".)

== Structure ==
The First Symphony is in four movements. They are as follows:

1. Allegro moderato—Andante cantabile—Tempo I—Andante cantabile—Tempo I—Largamente
2. Adagio—Un poco più mosso—Tempo I
3. Scherzo. Allegro vivace—Trio. Meno mosso—Scherzo da capo
4. Finale. Allegro con spirito—Allegro festivo

Larsson's Symphony No. 1 remains unpublished; apparently, the manuscript is—according to the BIS Records liner notes from its 1989 release—under the copyright-collecting auspices of the Swedish Performing Rights Society (STIM).

== Recordings ==
The sortable table below lists commercially available recordings of the Symphony No. 1:

Conductor	Orchestra	Rec. (Note: Refers to the year in which the performers recorded the work; this may not be the same as the year in which the recording was first released to the general public.)	Time	Recording venue	Label	Ref.
Hans-Peter Frank	Helsingborg Symphony Orchestra (1)	1989	30:45	Helsingborg Concert Hall	BIS	(Note: H. Frank–BIS (CD–426) 1989)
Andrew Manze	Helsingborg Symphony Orchestra	2011	30:04	Helsingborg Concert Hall	cpo	(Note: A. Manze–cpo (777 671–2) 2014)

== Notes, references, and sources ==
Notes

Sources

- Schlüren, Christoph (2014). Lars-Erik Larsson: Symphony No. 1 / Music for Orchestra / Lyric Fantasy (CD booklet). Translated by Robinson, J. Bradford. Andrew Manze & Helsingborg Symphony Orchestra. cpo. p. 13–17. 777 671–2. OCLC 880851753
- Skans, Per (1989). Lars-Erik Larsson: Symphony No. 1 in D major, Op. 2 / Symphony No. 2, Op. 17 (CD booklet). Hans-Peter Frank & Helsingborg Symphony Orchestra. BIS. p. 3–4. CD–426. OCLC 25048091
