= Edmond de Favières =

Edmond de Favières, full name Edmond Guillaume François de Favières, (8 November 1755 – 13 March 1837) was a French playwright and politician.

== Works ==
- Paul et Virginie, comédie en trois actes et en prose (1791)
- Les Espiègleries de garnison, comédie en trois actes (1792)
- Lisbeth, drame lyrique en trois actes et en prose (1797)
- Elisca ou l'Amour maternel, drame lyrique en trois actes (1799)
- Fanny Morna, ou l’Écossaise, drame lyrique en trois actes (1799)

librettist

- Jean et Geneviève, 1-act comedy by Jean-Pierre Sollié with a libretto by Edmond de Favière (1792)
- L’Officier de fortune, 3-act drama by André Grétry (1792 but unperformed)
