= Okko Kamu =

Finnish orchestral conductor and violinist

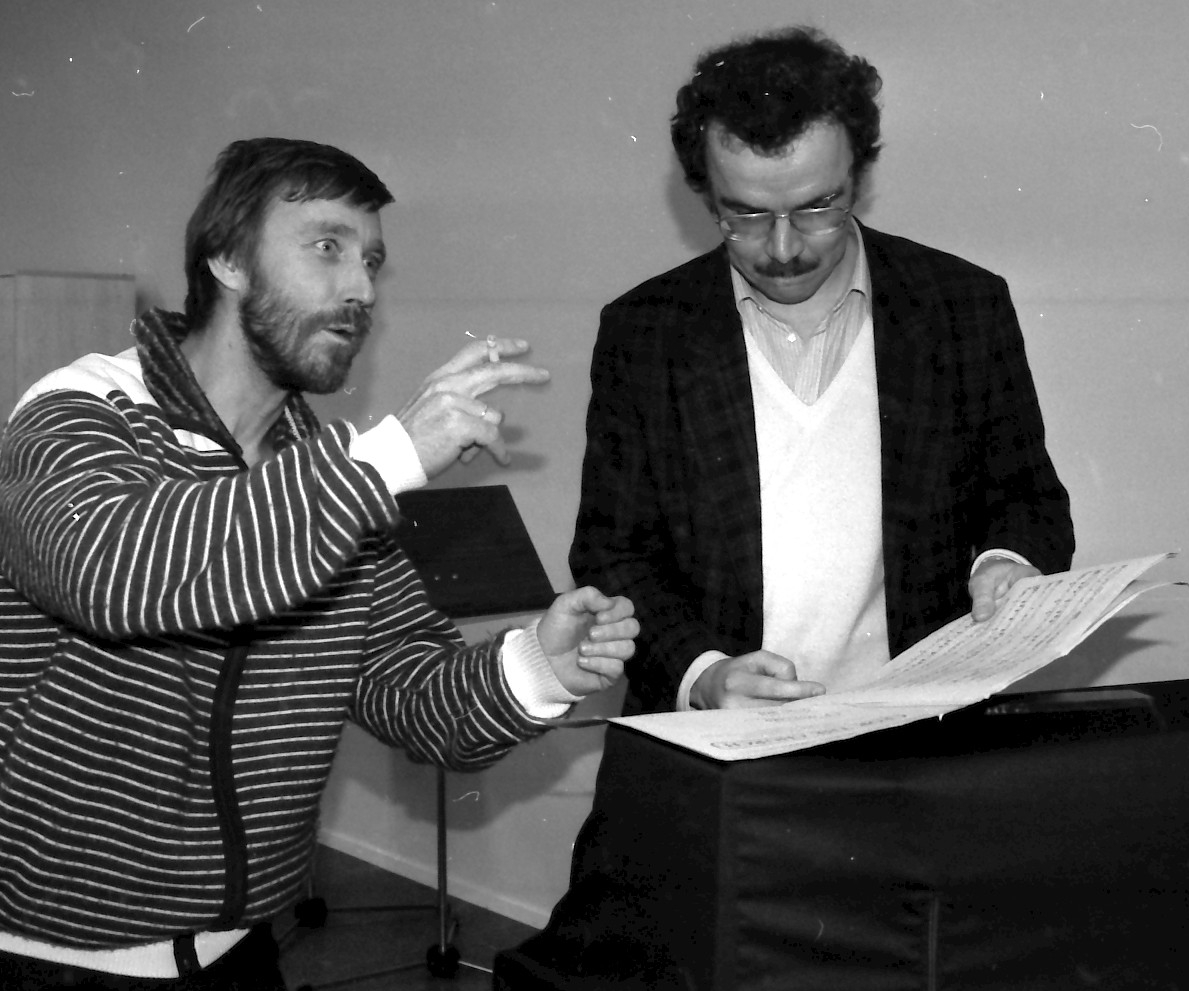
- Okko Kamu (left) in 1987
- Born: Okko Tapani Kamu; 7 March 1946 (age 79); Helsinki, Finland
- Occupation(s): Orchestral conductor, violinist, film director
- Years active: 1969–present
- Children: 6
- Parent(s): Adam Kamu, Eine (Syrjänen) Kamu

Okko Tapani Kamu (born 7 March 1946, Helsinki, Finland) is a Finnish orchestral conductor and violinist. He has a considerable discography and has held leading positions with several Scandinavian orchestras.

== Life and career ==
Kamu was born in Helsinki, the son of Adam Kamu, a musician, and his wife Eine (Syrjänen) Kamu, a violin maker. His father played double bass in the Helsinki Philharmonic. He began violin studies at age two and entered the Sibelius Academy at age six. He formed his own string quartet, the Suhonen (named after his teacher Onni Suhonen), in 1964 where he played first violin. At age 20, he was appointed first solo violinist at the Finnish National Opera, and held this post until 1968. He then began to conduct, initially with the Finnish National Opera orchestra. Primarily self-taught, he became principal guest conductor of the Royal Swedish Opera in 1969, the same year as he won the first Herbert von Karajan Conducting Competition in Berlin. From 1971 to 1977, Kamu was principal conductor of the Finnish Radio Symphony Orchestra.

Outside of Finland, Kamu was principal conductor of the Oslo Philharmonic from 1975 to 1979. He has also held leadership positions with the Stockholm Sinfonietta. He has been chief guest conductor of the City of Birmingham Symphony Orchestra, Copenhagen Philharmonic, the Helsingborg Symphony Orchestra, and the Lausanne Chamber Orchestra. He was principal guest conductor of the Singapore Symphony Orchestra until 2017.

Kamu was chief conductor of the Finnish National Opera from 1996 to 2000. He has been a noted conductor of the operas of Aulis Sallinen in the opera house where he conducted the premieres of The Red Line, King Lear and The Palace, and on record. He also conducted the premieres of Sallinen's 2nd and 3rd symphonies, and has recorded others. In April 2009, the Lahti Symphony Orchestra announced the appointment of Kamu as its next chief conductor, as of the autumn of 2011. Kamu's initial contract was through the spring of 2014. In November 2012, the orchestra announced the extension of Kamu's contract through the end of July 2016, at which time he concluded his tenure in Lahti.

Kamu has recorded more than 100 discs for various labels, such as Finlandia and Musica Sveciae. For Naxos Records, he has recorded Franz Berwald's four symphonies and his piano concerto; Aulis Sallinen's Complete Music for String Orchestra; flute concertos by Penderecki, Takemitsu and Sallinen. Kamu's two discs of Berwald for Naxos both received the rare Diapason d'Or award.

In 1994, Kamu became a member of the Royal Swedish Academy of Music. He was awarded the Order of the Lion of Finland medal in 1999 by then president of Finland Martti Ahtisaari. In 1980 he owned an island on the south coast of Finland "to indulge his passion for boating and fishing".

Cultural offices
Preceded by Paavo Berglund	Principal Conductor, Finnish Radio Symphony Orchestra; 1971–1977	Succeeded by Leif Segerstam
Preceded by Ulf Söderblom	Principal Conductor, Helsinki Philharmonic Orchestra; 1981–1988	Succeeded by Sergiu Comissiona
Preceded by Osmo Vänskä	Chief Conductor, Lahti Symphony Orchestra; 2011–2016	Succeeded by Dima Slobodeniouk
