= Franz Berwald =

Swedish Romantic composer (1796 – 1868)

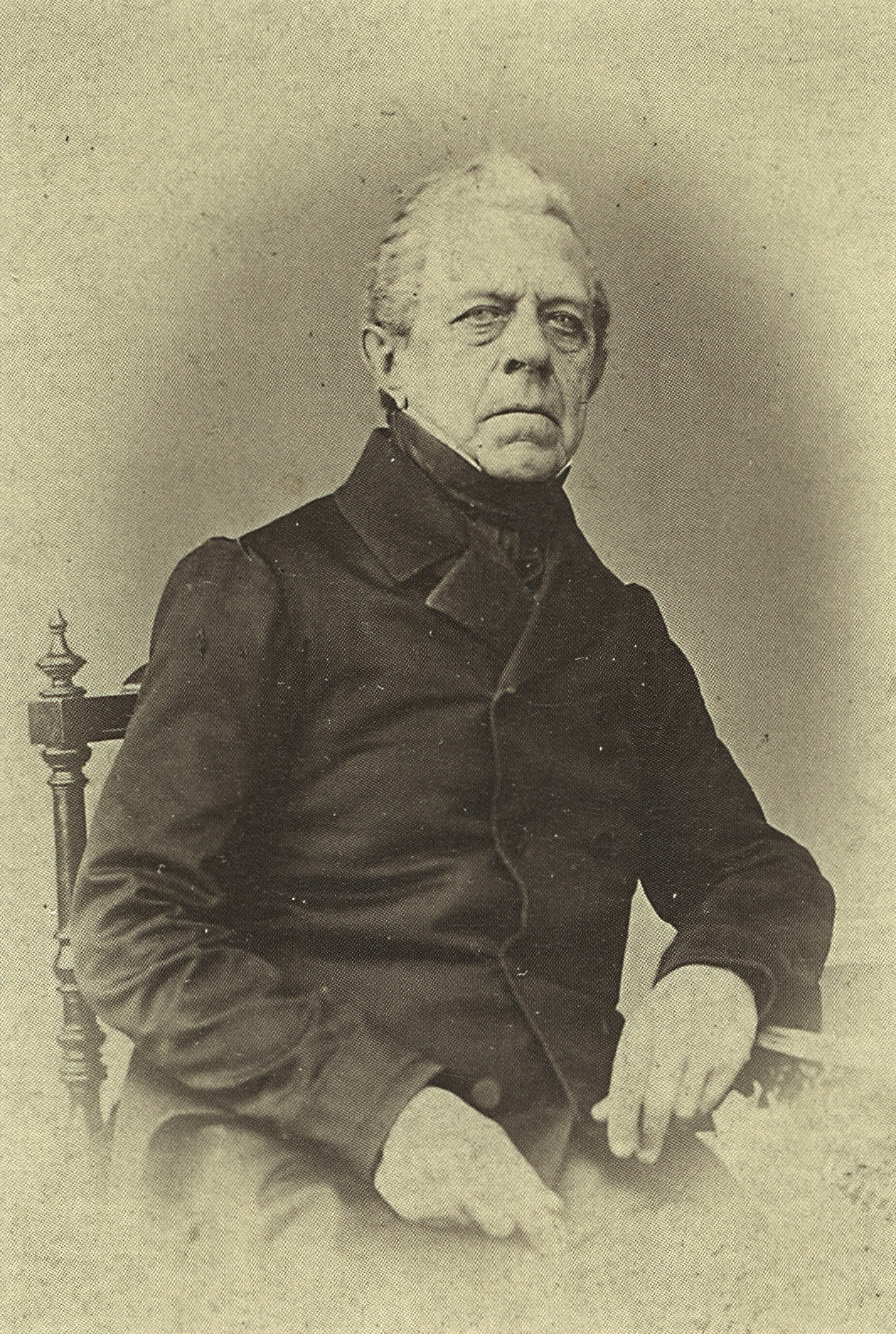
- Berwald c. 1860
- Born: Franz Adolf Berwald; 23 July 1796; Stockholm, Kingdom of Sweden
- Died: 3 April 1868 (aged 71); Stockholm, Sweden–Norway
- Resting place: Norra begravningsplatsen
- Occupations: Composer; violinist
- Years active: 1809–1868

Franz Adolf Berwald (23 July 1796 – 3 April 1868) was a Swedish Romantic composer and violinist. He made his living as an orthopedist and later as the manager of a saw mill and glass factory, and became more appreciated as a composer after his death than he had been in his lifetime. Prominent in his oeuvre are several operas, much chamber music and four symphonies.

== Life and works ==
Berwald was born in Stockholm and came from a family with four generations of musicians; his father, Christian Friedrich Georg Berwald a violinist in the Royal Opera Orchestra, taught Franz the violin from an early age; he soon appeared in concerts. In 1809, Karl XIII came to power and reinstated the Royal Chapel; the following year Berwald started working there, as well as playing the violin in the court orchestra and the opera, receiving lessons from Edouard du Puy, and also started composing. The summers were off-season for the orchestra, and Berwald travelled around Scandinavia, Finland and Russia. Of his works from that time, a septet and a serenade he still considered worthwhile music in his later years.

In 1818 Berwald started publishing the Musikalisk journal, later renamed Journal de musique, a periodical with easy piano pieces and songs by various composers as well as some of his own original work. In 1821, his Violin Concerto was premiered by his brother August. It was not well received; some people in the audience burst out laughing during the slow movement. He also composed a concerto for two violins, which is unfortunately lost.

His family got into dire economic circumstances after the death of his father in 1825. Berwald tried to get several scholarships, but only got one from the King, which enabled him to study in Berlin, where he worked hard on operas despite not having any chance to put them on the stage. Berwald had a keen interest in orthopedics, and was particularly impressed by the work of Pehr Henrik Ling. To make a living, Berwald started an orthopedic and physiotherapy clinic in Berlin in 1835 based on Ling's principles and his own ideas. There he designed and constructed machines to enable active muscle training, which was a new concept at that time. The clinic became successful, allowing Berwald to offer free treatment to patients who were unable to afford to pay. Some of the orthopedic devices he invented were still in use decades after his death.

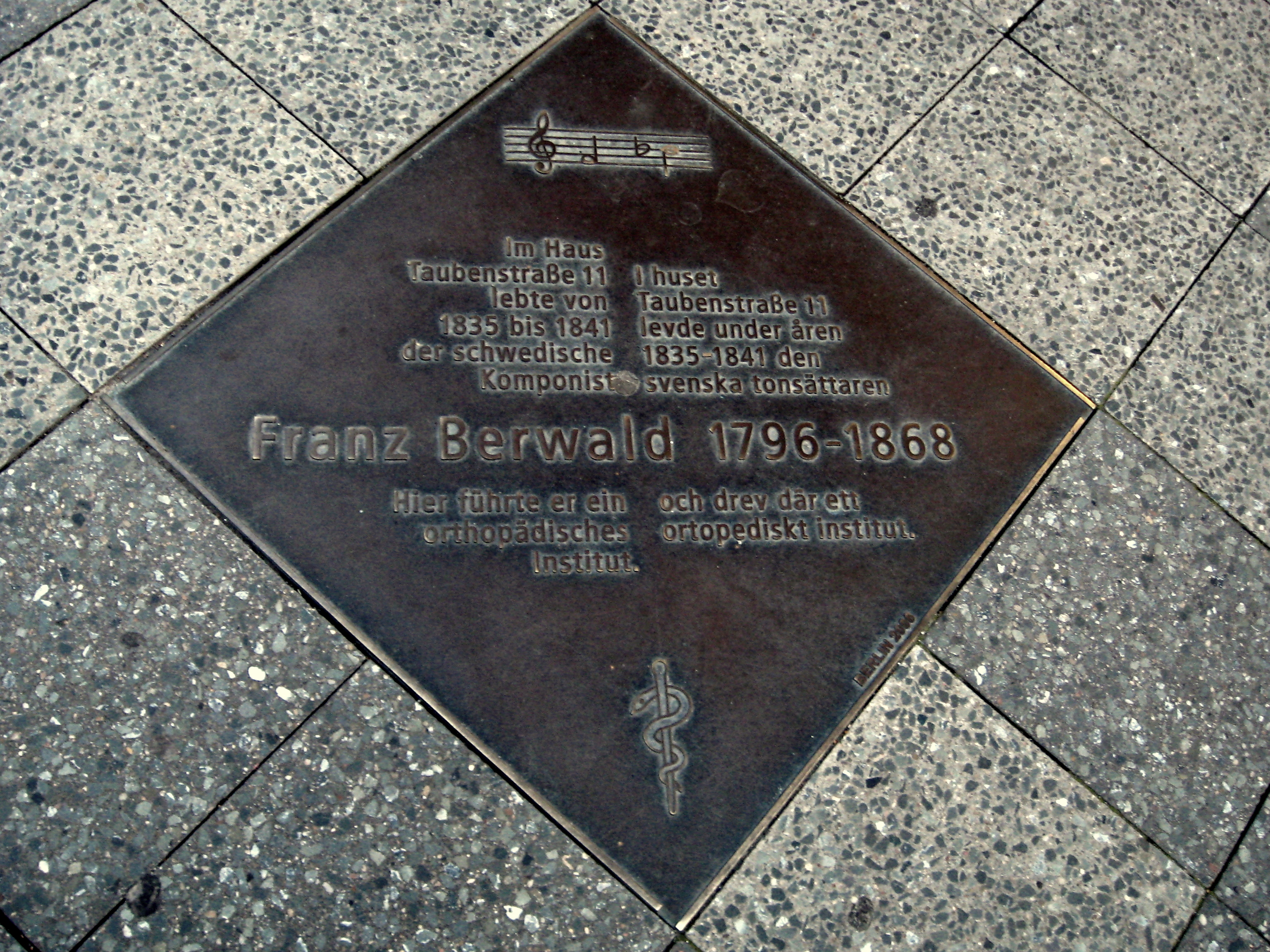
A pavement plate commemorating Berwald's time in Berlin and his orthopedic clinic

He stopped composing during his time in Berlin, resuming only in 1841 with a move to Vienna and marriage to Mathilde Scherer. In 1842 a concert of his tone poems at the Redoutensaal at the Hofburg Imperial Palace received extremely positive reviews, and over the course of the next three years Berwald wrote four symphonies. These were not the first symphonies he had written: numerous major works from the 1820s have gone missing, and the torso of a Symphony in A's first movement remains, has been finished, and recorded.

A symphony in A, written in 1820, was performed in 1821, but survives only in fragmentary form. The Symphony No. 1 in G minor, "Sérieuse", is the only one of Berwald's four extant symphonies that was performed in his lifetime. In 1843, it was premiered in Stockholm with his cousin Johan Frederik conducting the Royal Opera House Orchestra. At that same concert, his operetta Jag går i kloster (I enter a monastery) was also performed, but its success is credited to one of the roles having been sung by Jenny Lind. In 1846, Lind sang in one of Berwald's cantatas. Another operetta, The Modiste, had less success in 1845.

His Piano Concerto, finished in 1855, intended for his piano pupil Hilda Aurora Thegerström, who continued her studies with Antoine François Marmontel and Franz Liszt, did not see the light of day until 1904, when Berwald's granddaughter Astrid performed it at a Stockholm student concert. Particularly in its brilliant last movement it may be compared favourably to Robert Schumann or Edvard Grieg. Its three movements are played without a break – indeed, the score bears the legend 'the work can be performed without orchestra'. After Berwald's death, his son Hjalmar submitted it pseudonymously to the Musikaliska Konstföreningen competition, where the composer Gade praised it as 'well-arranged and skillfully executed' but it could not be awarded the prize as the rules stipulated that the composer had to be living.

Berwald's music was not recognised favourably in Sweden during his lifetime, even drawing hostile newspaper reviews, but fared a little better in Germany and Austria. The Mozarteum Salzburg made him an honorary member in 1847.

When Berwald returned to Sweden in 1849, he managed a glass works at Sandö in Ångermanland owned by Ludvig Petré, an amateur violinist. During that time Berwald focused his attention on producing chamber music.

One of his few operas to be staged in his lifetime, Estrella de Soria, was heartily applauded at its premiere at the Royal Theater in April 1862, and was given four more performances in the same month. Following this success, he wrote Drottningen av Golconda (The Queen of Golconda), which would have been premiered in 1864, but was not, due to a change of directors at the Royal Opera.

In 1866, Berwald received the Swedish Order of the Polar Star, in recognition of his musical achievements. The following year, the Board of the Royal Musical Academy appointed Berwald professor of musical composition at the Stockholm Conservatory, only to have the Conservatory Board reverse the decision a few days later, and appoint another. The royal family stepped in, and Berwald got the post. At around that time he was also given many important commissions, but he did not live to fulfill them all.

Berwald died in Stockholm in 1868 of pneumonia and was interred there in the Norra begravningsplatsen (Northern Cemetery). The second movement of the Symphony No. 1 was played at his funeral.

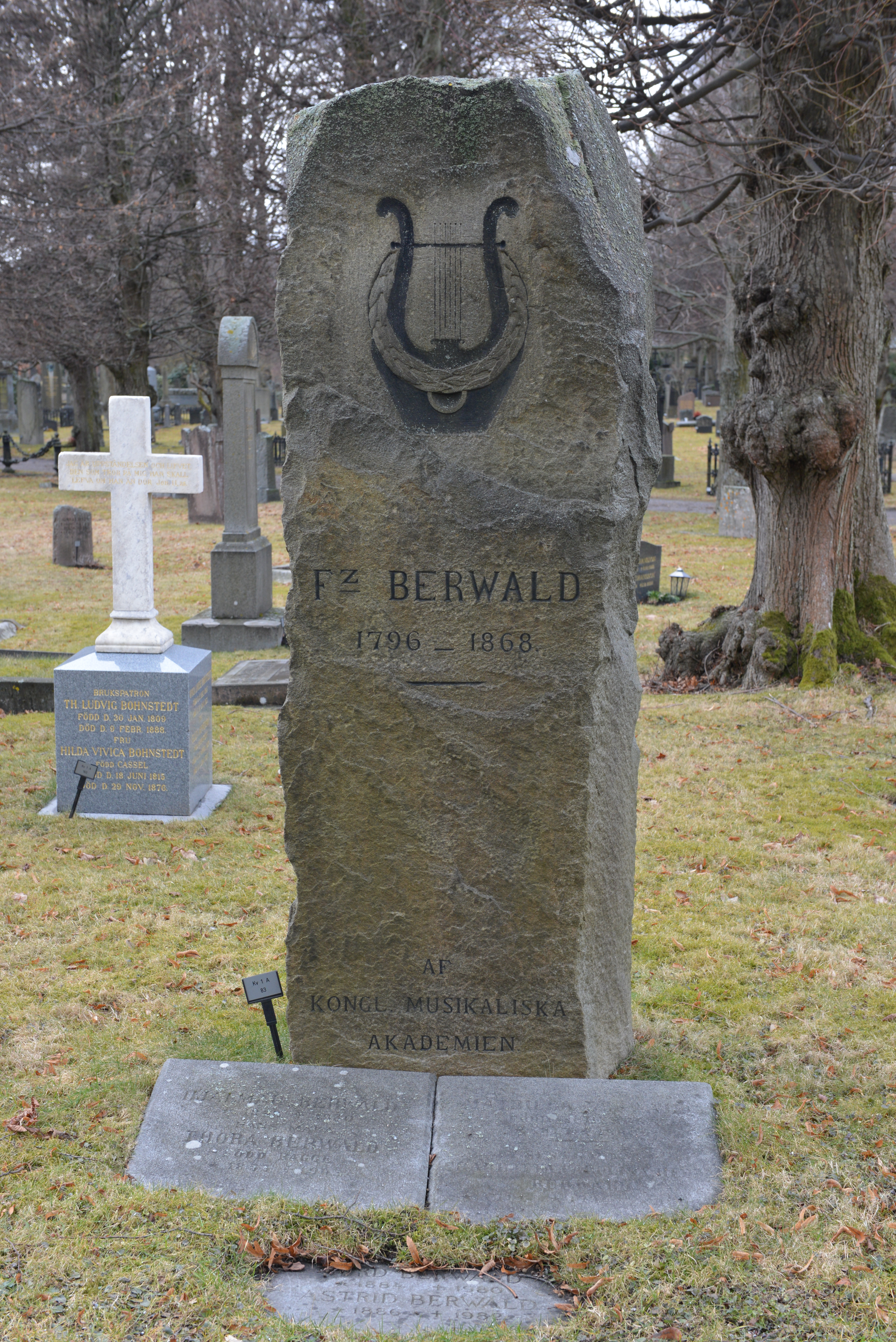
Berwald's grave

Ten years after Berwald's death, his Symphony No. 4 in E♭ major, "Naïve", was premiered in 1878 (the originally planned 1848 premiere in Paris having been cancelled because of the political unrest of the time). This gap between composition and first performance was relatively short, however, compared with what befell the Symphony No. 2 in D major, "Capricieuse" and Symphony No. 3 in C major, "Singulière". Those two pieces were not premiered until 1914 and 1905, respectively.

The Swedish conductor and composer Ulf Björlin has recorded various works of Berwald under the EMI Classics label.

== Critical assessment ==
Eduard Hanslick, writing in his 1869 book Geschichte des Concertwesens in Wien, opined of Berwald, "a man stimulating, witty, prone to bizarrerie, [who] as a composer lacked creative power and fantasy". On the other hand, composers Ludvig Norman, Tor Aulin, and Wilhelm Stenhammar worked hard to promote Berwald's music. However, despite these musicians' efforts, it took a while before Berwald was recognized as, to quote composer-critic Wilhelm Peterson-Berger, writing in the Stockholm newspaper Dagens Nyheter, Sweden's "most original and modern composer".

In 1911, Carl Nielsen wrote of Berwald, "Neither the media, money nor power can damage or benefit good Art. It will always find some simple, decent artists who forge ahead and produce and stand up for their works. In Sweden, you have the finest example of this: Berwald." More recently, British musicologist Robert Layton wrote in 1959 what remains the sole English-language biography of Berwald, as well as discussing Berwald's music in considerable detail elsewhere.

One of the examples given by Harold Truscott (in his analysis of Havergal Brian's Gothic Symphony) of composers prior to Brian writing "sonata movements which do not order their events on the usual plan" is Franz Berwald, "a storehouse of them ... but he never did unusual things in any way that impaired sonata style. They were always logical, though surprising, and helped, rather than hindered, the sonata shape and expression."

Of Berwald's E♭ major String Quartet, Paul Griffiths finds that the "achievement ... of a new formal shape is remarkable enough, even if the single-movement structures of Liszt or Schumann are more tightly bound."

== Works ==
=== Symphonies ===
- Symphony in A (Fragment) (1820)
- Symphony No. 1 in G minor (Sinfonie sérieuse) (1842)
- Symphony No. 2 in D (Sinfonie capricieuse) (1842)
- Symphony No. 3 in C (Sinfonie singulière) (1845)
- Symphony No. 4 in E♭ (Sinfonie naïve) (1845)

=== Concertante ===
- Theme and Variations in B♭ for Violin and Orchestra (1816)
- Concerto for 2 Violins and Orchestra (1817)
- Violin Concerto in C♯ minor (1820)
- Konzertstück in F for Bassoon and Orchestra (1827)
- Piano Concerto in D (1855)

=== Other orchestral works ===
- Tone poems
  - Slaget vid Leipzig (The Battle of Leipzig, 1828)
  - Elfenspiel (1841)
  - Ernste und heitere Grillen (1842)
  - Erinnerung an die norwegischen Alpen (1842)
  - Bayaderen-Fest (1842)
  - Wettlauf (1842)
- Fugue in E♭ (1841)
- Stor polonaise (Grand polonaise, 1843)

=== Chamber music ===
- Duo for Violin and Piano in D (1857–60)
- Duo for Cello (or Violin) and Piano in B♭ (1858)
- Duo Concertante for 2 Violins in A (1816)
- Piano Trio in C (1845)
- Piano Trio No. 1 in E♭ (1849)
- Piano Trio No. 2 in F minor (1851)
- Piano Trio No. 3 in D minor (1851)
- Piano Trio No. 4 in C (1853)
- String Quartet No. 1 in G minor (1818)
- String Quartet No. 2 in A minor (1849)
- String Quartet No. 3 in E♭ (1849)
- Quartet in E♭ for Piano, Clarinet, Horn and Bassoon (1819)
- Piano Quintet No. 1 in C minor (1853)
- Piano Quintet No. 2 in A (1850–57)
- Septet in B♭ for Clarinet, Horn, Bassoon, Violin, Viola, Cello and Double Bass (1828)
- various piano pieces

=== Vocal works ===
- Kantat i anledning av högtidligheterna (1821)
- Serenade for tenor and chamber ensemble (1825)
- Kantat författad i anledning av HKH Kronprinsessans ankomst till Sverige och höga förmälning (1823)
- Gustaf Adolph den stores seger och död vid Lützen (1845)
- Nordiska fantasibilder (1846)
- Gustaf Wasas färd till Dalarna (1849)
- Apoteos (1864)
- other choral works and songs

=== Stage works ===
- Leonida, opera (1829, lost)
- Jag går i kloster, operetta (1843; first performance 1843)
- Modehandlerskan, operetta (1843; first performance 1845)
- Ein ländliches Verlobungsfest in Schweden, cantata (1847)
- Estrella de Soria, opera (1841/48)
- Drottningen av Golconda (The Queen of Golconda), opera (1864)

=== Work for wind orchestra ===
- Revue-Marsch
