= Tor Mann =

Swedish conductor

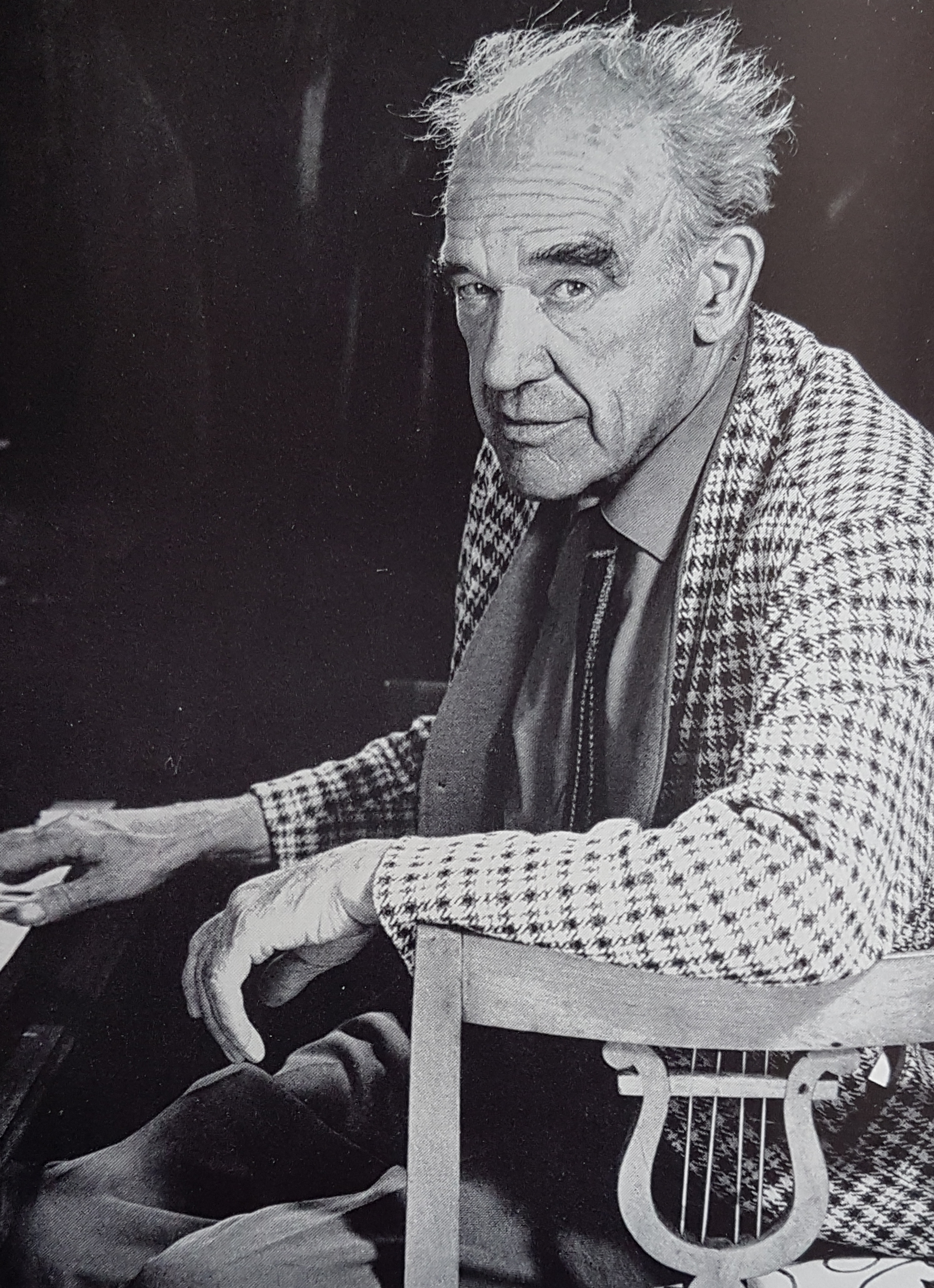
Tor Mann

Tor Mann (25 February 1894 in Stockholm – 29 March 1974 in Stockholm) was a Swedish conductor.

Mann was principal conductor of the Göteborgs Symfoniker from 1925 to 1939, and the Sveriges Radios Symfoniorkester from 1939 to 1959. He was married to the Swedish conductor Ortrud Mann née Åkerberg (1917–2006) and had a daughter.
