= Estrella de Soria =

Estrella de Soria is a three-act opera by Franz Berwald, to a libretto by Otto Prechtler translated into Swedish by Ernst Wallmark.

It was first performed at the Royal Swedish Opera, Stockholm on 9 April 1862 and had five performances in that run. It has never entered the repertory, although it was revived in Stockholm in 1898 and 1946. The overture, which makes use of Estrella’s first act aria, has occasionally been recorded, and a CD of extended excerpts was released by Musica Sveciae in 1994. An aria for Estrella was the first recording by Birgit Nilsson in 1947 (and has been since re-issued). A full score of the 1862 edition was published as Volume 17a-b of the complete Bärenreiter edition.

== Roles ==
Role	Voice type	Premiere cast, 9 April 1862 (Conductor: Ludvig Norman)
Estrella, Countess of Soria	soprano	Fredrika Andrée
Zulma, a Moorish princess	soprano	Strandberg
Salvaterra, A Castilian General	tenor	Arnoldsson
Muza, A Moorish Prince	bass	Wilman
Sambrano, A Knight	tenor	Sandström
Diego, A servant of Estrella	baritone	Arlberg
The King of Castile	bass	Walin
Chorus: Courtiers, Moors.

== Synopsis ==
The opera is set in 15th-century Castile.

=== Act 1 ===
The Countess de Soria (soprano) plans to marry General Salvaterra (tenor), who has won a decisive victory over the Moors. However, he has also captured the Moorish Prince Muza (bass) and has fallen in love with his betrothed, the Princess Zulma (soprano). Zulma responds to Salvaterra and offers him a sash. Muza insists that Salvaterra keeps a promise to him to release him and Zulma; when Zulma says that she will stay in Castile, Muza swears vengeance. Estrella, countess of Soria, has heard of the love of Salvaterra and the captive Moorish princess, but remains convinced that he will return her love.

=== Act 2 ===
In the woods outside the city Salvaterra is warned by the knight Sambrano of Muza's threats, and takes Zulma to Salvaterra's castle, but is ambushed by Muza and his men. Alone at the king's palace, Estrella is downcast, while preparations continue for a victory celebration. The king of Castile offers Salvaterra the hand of Estrella but Diego, Estrella's servant, notices that he is wearing a sash from Zulma; Estrella is distraught, but amid the confusion the king orders the celebration to continue. Muza approaches the king and announces that his bride has been stolen by Salvaterra, and draws his sword. Muza is slain and the king banishes Salvaterra.

=== Act 3 ===
At a spot by the sea peasants and sailors are at work; Salvaterra and Zulma nearby. Sambrano arrives and tells his master that Estrella and Diego are approaching. When Salvaterra goes to arrange an escape by sea, Estrella notices a veiled woman and orders that she be taken to a cliff to be killed. When Salvaterra returns and finds Estrella she orders her men to take him. As a storm begins Sambrano arrives and Estrella's men are disarmed and Zulma rescued. Although Estrella calls destruction down upon her enemies, Salvaterra and Zulma put out to sea on a ship, and in despair Estrella stabs herself.

== Sources ==
- Layton R, Van Boer BH. Franz Berwald. In: The New Grove Dictionary of Opera. Macmillan, London and New York, 1997.
- Bärenreiter edition: Estrella de Soria
