= Ulf Björlin =

Swedish composer and conductor

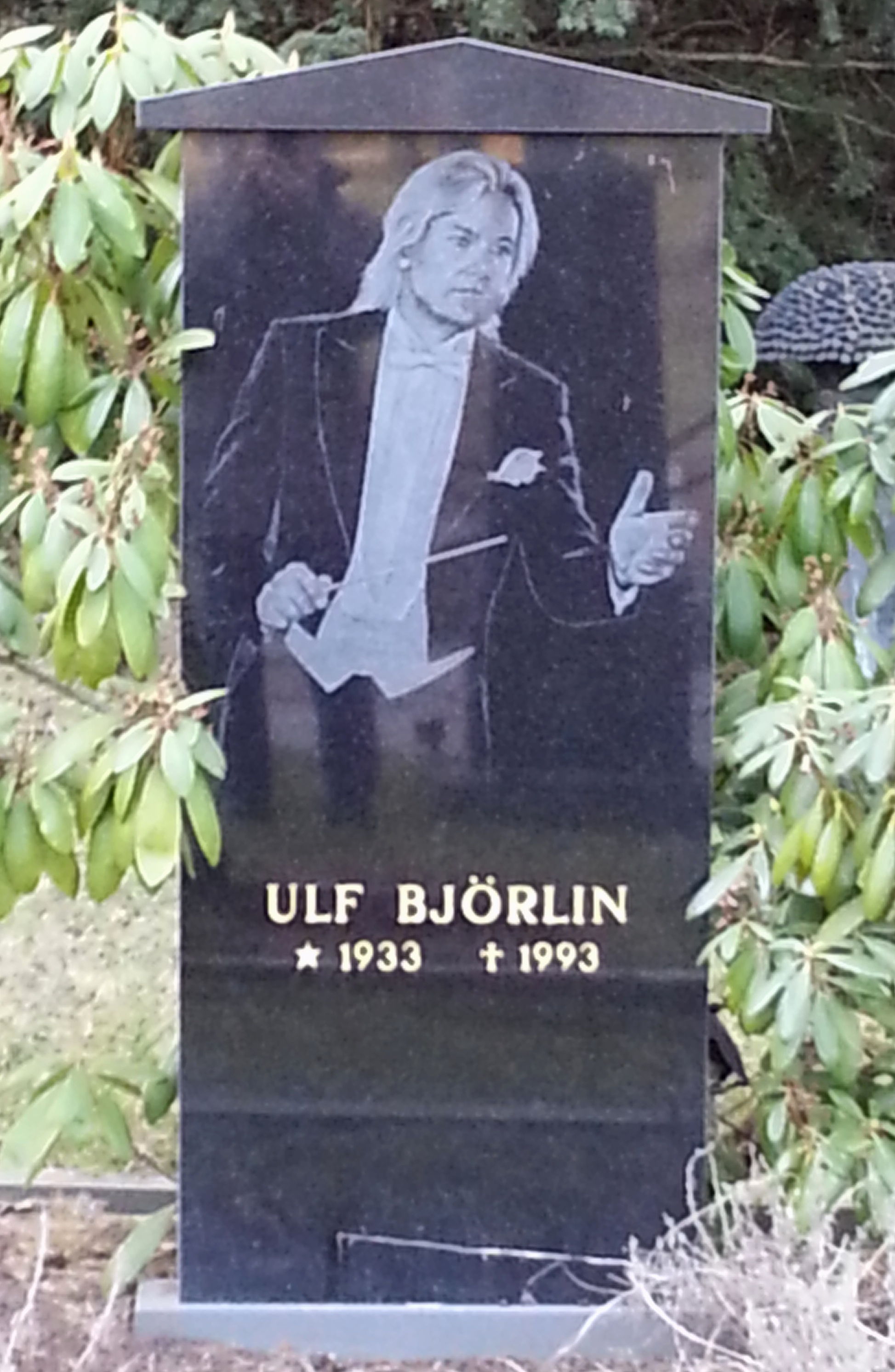
Ulf Bjorlin

Mats Ulf Stefan Björlin (21 May 1933 – 23 October 1993) was a Swedish composer and conductor. Bjorlin was known for being one of the most active opera composers in the 20th century.

== Biography ==
Björlin was born in Stockholm in 1933. He studied music with conductor Igor Markevitch in Salzburg, Austria at age 19 and later continued his studies at the Conservatoire de Paris, with teacher Nadia Boulanger. After completing his military service, he worked at the Royal Swedish Opera in Stockholm and at the Malmö College of Music. From 1962, he was employed as musical producer at Sveriges Radio and wrote music for several movies and television productions, including the series of films and TV series about the children on the island Saltkråkan (Seacrow Island), based on Astrid Lindgren's scripts.

He also worked as music director for many years under Ingmar Bergman at the Royal Dramatic Theatre in Stockholm. Bjorlin came to the United States in 1977. He served as guest conductor for the London Symphony and the Philadelphia Orchestra.

He worked with Evert Taube, his neighbor from a very young age. Later, together with Sven-Bertil Taube, he also produced a number of recordings of songs by Carl Michael Bellman, Evert Taube and Ulf Peder Olrog. He conducted several recordings of orchestral music by fellow Swedes Johan Helmich Roman and Franz Berwald.

Björlin received among other prizes the Fritz Gustaf Grafström Prize in 1961, and shared the Evert Taube Prize with Sven-Bertil Taube in 1975. He received the Swedish Music Achievement prize, In 1980, he received the 'Golden key' to the city of Newport, Rhode Island for his musical achievements and for bringing culture to their town. The 7th (?) of September was declared 'Maestro Ulf Bjorlin Day' by the Mayor of Newport.

During his last years he worked in Florida mostly, where he was conductor of the Greater Palm Beach Symphony (since 1987) and the Florida Philharmonic Orchestra. He recorded several albums for the EMI label. He died of leukemia in Palm Beach, Florida at the age of 60. He was survived by his wife, Fary; three daughters: actress Nadia Bjorlin, of Palm Beach, Katja Salen of Stockholm, and Kamilla Pariser of Marblehead, Mass.; three sons: Ulf Jr and Jean-Paul, both of Palm Beach, and Kaj, of Stockholm; two brothers, and two grandchildren.

He had composed important work such as the "Musical Portrait of Raoul Wallenberg" and several operas in the years before his death. He was known to be the most active opera composer in the world in the 20th century.
