= Malmö Symphony Orchestra =

Swedish symphony orchestra

Coordinates: 55°36′27″N 12°59′37″E

- Orchestra
- Native name: Malmö Symfoniorkester
- Founded: 1925; 101 years ago
- Location: Malmö, Sweden
- Concert hall: Malmö Live Concert Hall
- Principal conductor: Martyn Brabbins
- Website: www.srso.se

The Malmö Symphony Orchestra (Swedish: Malmö Symfoniorkester) is a Swedish orchestra, based in Malmö. Since 2015, it has been resident at the Malmö Live Concert Hall. The orchestra has a complement of 94 musicians.

== History ==
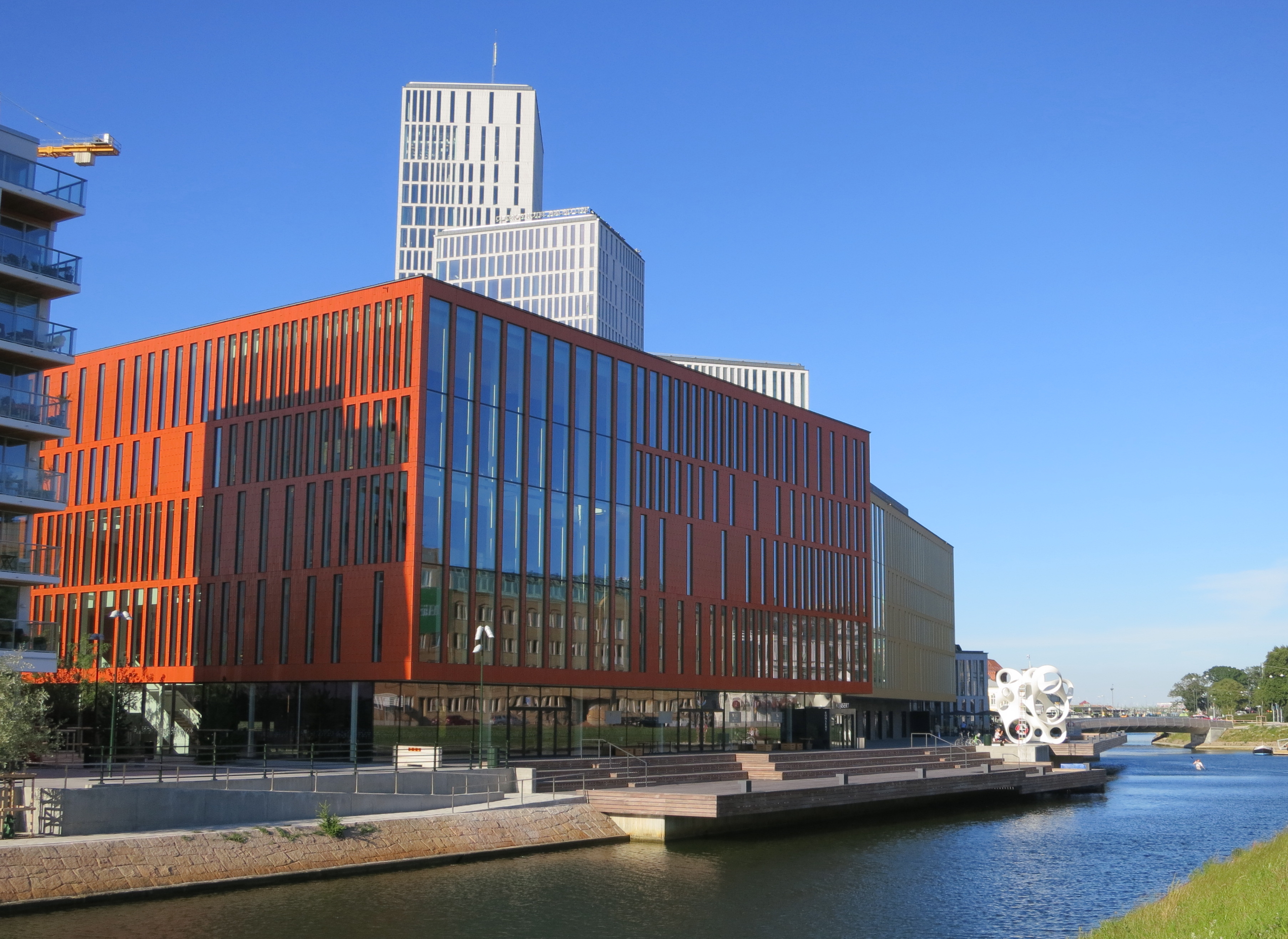
Malmö Live Concert Hall

The orchestra was founded in 1925 with Walther Meyer-Radon as the first chief conductor, from 1925 to 1929.

At first, the orchestra performed both symphony concerts and served as the orchestra of the Malmö Opera and Music Theatre. From 1991 onwards, the orchestra has been exclusively devoted to symphony orchestra concerts. Between 1985 and 2015, the orchestra gave its main concert series in the Malmö Concert Hall, after which they moved to Malmö Live.

Herbert Blomstedt held the title of Huvuddirigent (principal conductor) during 1962–1963. Past principal guest conductors have included Brian Priestman (1988–1990), Gilbert Varga (1997–2000), and Mario Venzago (2000–2003).

Robert Treviño was chief conductor of the orchestra from 2019 to 2021, and subsequently held the title of artistic adviser for 2 years. In June 2024, the orchestra announced the appointment of Martyn Brabbins as its next chief conductor, effective with the 2025-2026 season, with an initial contract of three seasons.

The orchestra has made recordings for such labels as BIS, Daphne, Ondine and Naxos.

== Chief conductors ==
- Walther Meyer-Radon (1925–1929)
- Georg Schnéevoigt (1930–1947)
- Sten-Åke Axelson (1948–1961)
- Rolf Agop (1962–1964)
- Peter Erős (1966–1968)
- Elyakum Shapirra (1969–1974)
- Janos Fürst (1974–1977)
- Stig Westerberg (1978–1985)
- Vernon Handley (1986–1988)
- James DePreist (1991–1994)
- Paavo Järvi (1994–1997)
- Christoph König (2003–2006)
- Vassily Sinaisky (2007–2011)
- Marc Soustrot (2011–2019)
- Robert Treviño (2019–2021)
- Martyn Brabbins (2025–present)

== Selected recordings ==
- Franz Schmidt: Symphony No. 1; Vassily Sinaisky, conductor (Naxos, 2009).
- Camille Saint-Saëns: Complete piano concertos and works for piano and orchestra; Romain Descharmes, piano; Marc Soustrot, conductor (Naxos, 2017)
- Camille Saint-Saëns: Concertos for cello and orchestra Nos. 1 and 2, Gabriel Schwabe, cello; Marc Soustrot, conductor (Naxos, 2017)
- Camille Saint-Saëns: Complete symphonies; Marc Soustrot, conductor (3 CDs, Naxos, 2020)
- Beethoven: Complete symphonies; Robert Treviño, conductor; Kate Royal, Christine Rice, Tuomas Katajala, Derek Welton (vocal soloists); Malmö Symphony Chorus (5 SACDs, Ondine, 2019)
