= Swedish Radio Symphony Orchestra =

Radio orchestra based in Stockholm, Sweden

- Radio orchestra
- Native name: Sveriges Radios Symfoniorkester
- Former name: Radioorkestern (1927); Underhållningsorkestern
- Founded: 1965; 61 years ago
- Location: Stockholm, Sweden
- Concert hall: Berwaldhallen
- Principal conductor: Andrés Orozco-Estrada
- Website: www.berwaldhallen.se/sveriges-radios-symfoniorkester

The Swedish Radio Symphony Orchestra (Swedish: Sveriges Radios Symfoniorkester) is a Swedish radio orchestra based in Stockholm, affiliated with Sveriges Radio (Sweden's Radio). Its principal performing venue is the Berwaldhallen (Berwald Hall). The orchestra broadcasts concerts on the Swedish Radio-P2 network.

== History ==
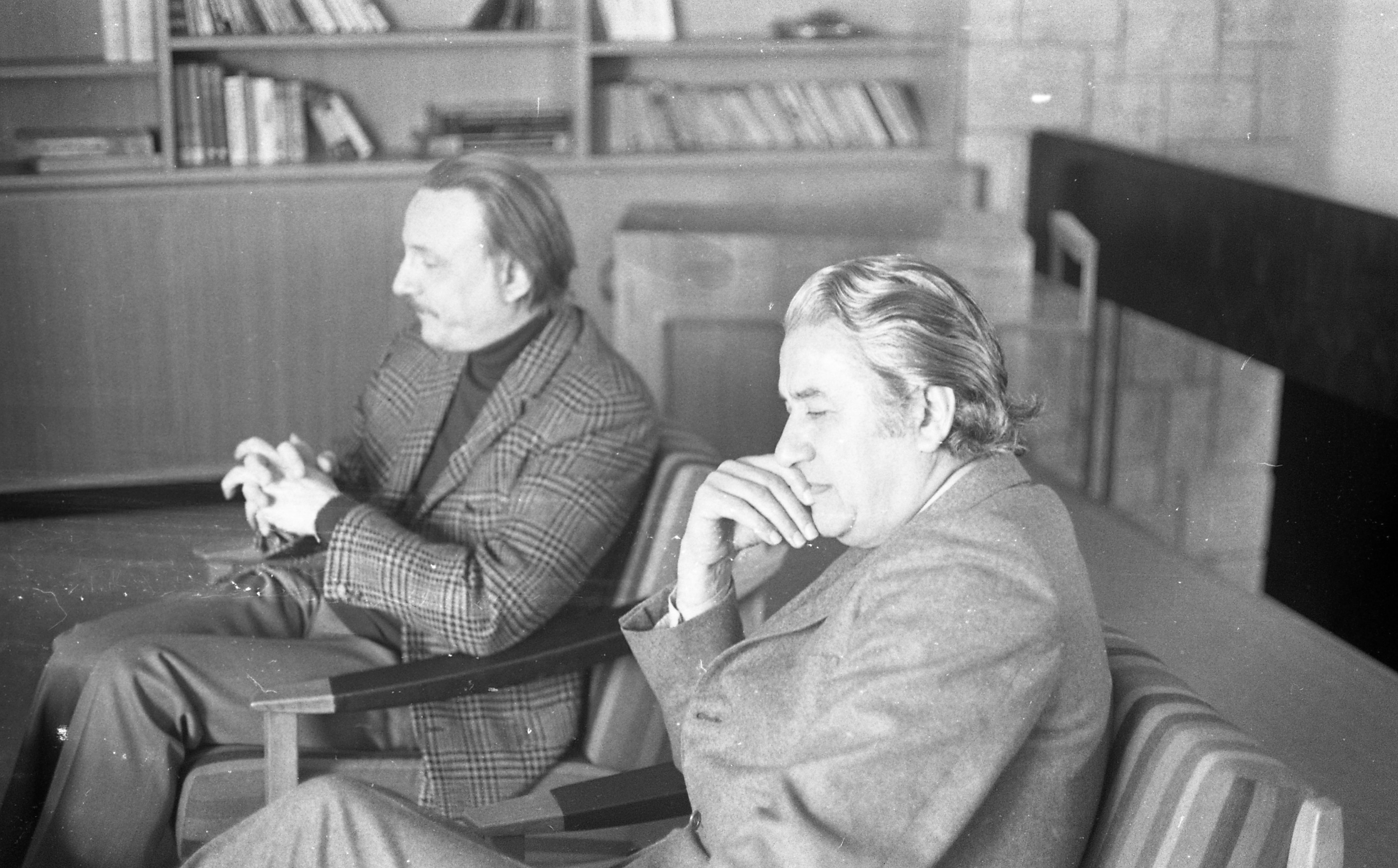
Sergiu Celibidache (on the right) and Arturo Benedetti Michelangeli during the orchestra's visit in Jerusalem, Israel, 1969

One of the precursor ensembles to the current orchestra was the Radioorkestern (Radio Orchestra), whose chief conductors included Nils Grevillius (1927–1939) and Tor Mann (1939–1959). In 1965, the Radioorkestern was merged with another orchestra from Swedish Radio, the Underhållningsorkestern (Entertainment Orchestra), under the new name of the Swedish Radio Symphony Orchestra. Sergiu Celibidache was the newly formed orchestra's first principal conductor, from 1965 to 1971. In 1979, the orchestra took up residence at the Berwaldhallen.

Daniel Harding became principal conductor in 2007. In September 2009, the orchestra announced the first extension of Harding's contract as principal conductor, through 2012. In April 2013, the orchestra announced a second extension of Harding's contract through 2015. In October 2018, the orchestra announced the extension of Harding's contract as principal conductor through 2023, along with granting him the new title of konstnärlig ledare (artistic leader). In November 2021, the orchestra announced an additional extension of Harding's contract through 2025. Harding concluded his tenure with the Swedish Radio Symphony Orchestra at the close of the 2024–2025 season.

Herbert Blomstedt, principal conductor of the orchestra from 1977 to 1982, now has the title of förste hedersdirigent (first honorary conductor) with the orchestra. Valery Gergiev and Esa-Pekka Salonen have held the title of hedersdirigent (honorary conductor) with the orchestra. In December 2017, the orchestra announced the appointment of Klaus Mäkelä as its next principal guest conductor, effective with the 2018–2019 season. Mäkelä was the youngest-ever conductor appointment to a titled post with the orchestra.

In October 2025, the orchestra announced the appointment of Andrés Orozco-Estrada as its next chief conductor, effective with the 2026-2027 season.

== Principal conductors ==
- Sergiu Celibidache (1965–1971)
- Herbert Blomstedt (1977–1982)
- Esa-Pekka Salonen (1984–1995)
- Yevgeny Svetlanov (1997–1999)
- Manfred Honeck (2000–2006)
- Daniel Harding (2007–2025)
- Andrés Orozco-Estrada (2026–present)

== Conductors laureate ==
- Herbert Blomstedt

== See also ==
- Category:Music commissioned by the Swedish Radio Symphony Orchestra (7)
