= Royal Swedish Opera =

Opera company in Stockholm, Sweden

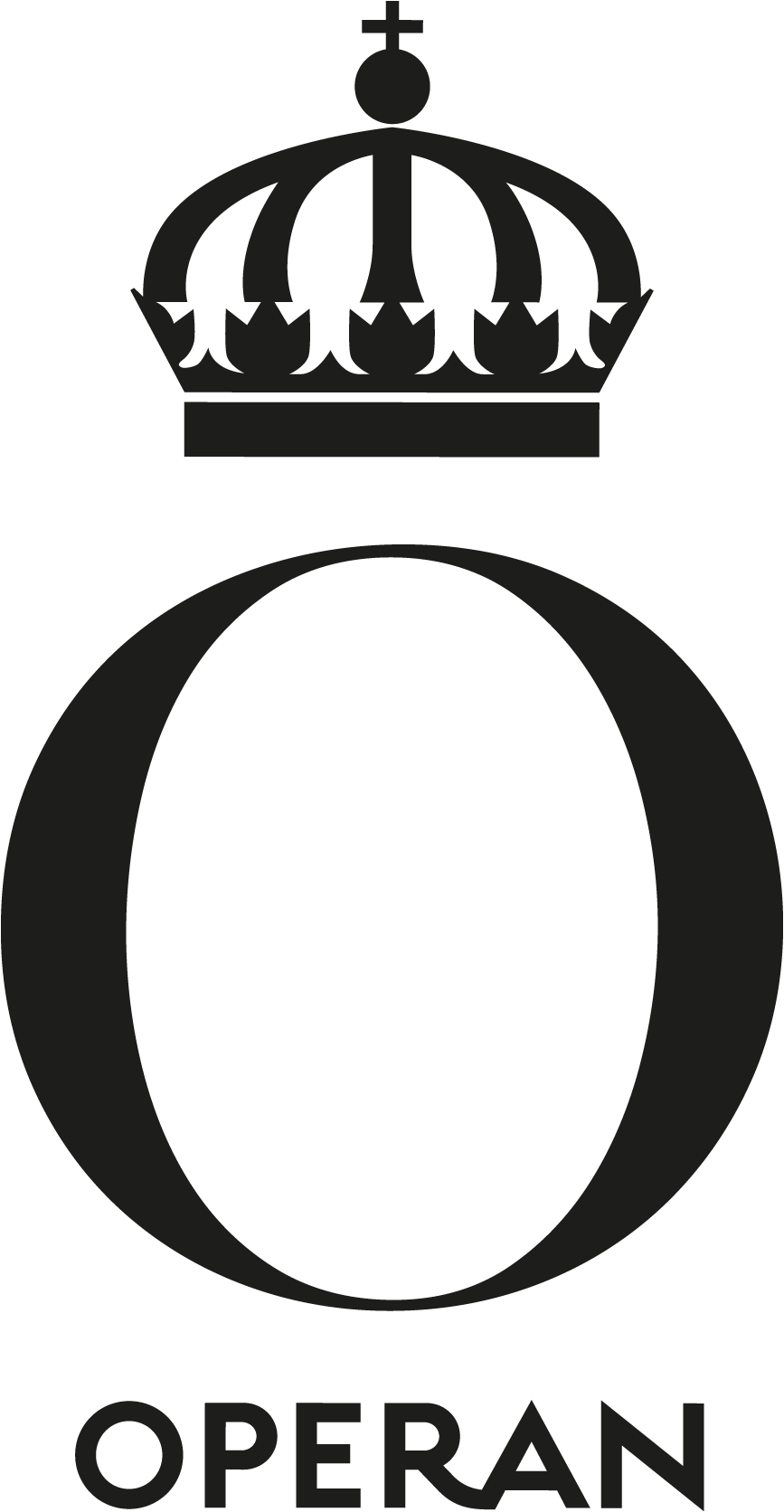

- The facade of the Royal Swedish Opera in 2023

General information
- Location: Stockholm, Sweden
- Coordinates: 59°19′47″N 18°04′14″E

Design and construction
- Architect: Axel Johan Anderberg

The Royal Swedish Opera (Swedish: Kungliga Operan, lit. 'The Royal Opera', or simply Operan) is Sweden's national stage for opera and ballet, based in Stockholm, Sweden. Founded in 1773 by King Gustav III, it was established to serve as a center for the development of the country's performing arts.

== Location and environment ==
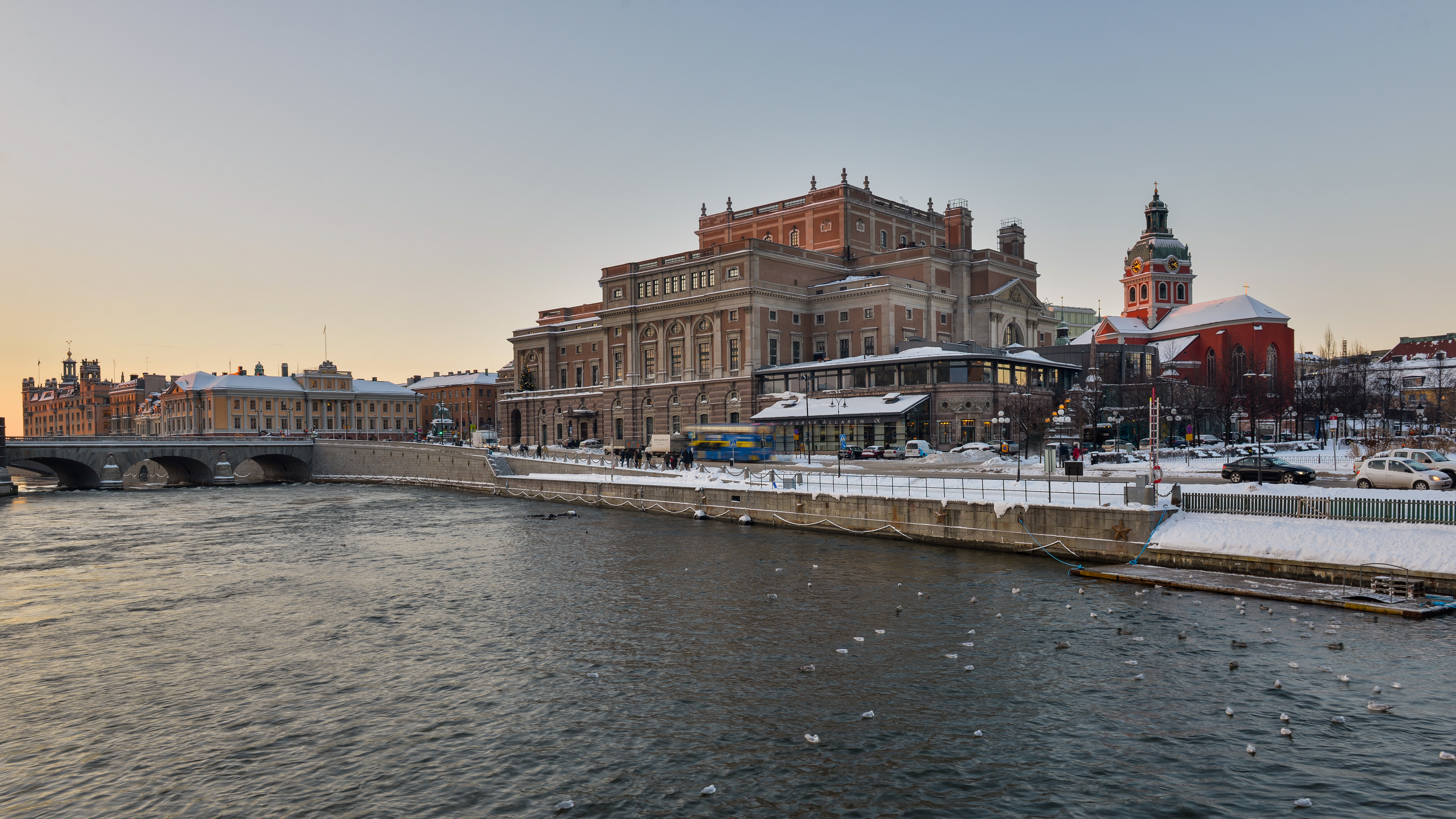
The Royal Opera House sits on the northern bank of the Norrström.

The building is located in the centre of Sweden's capital, Stockholm, in the borough of Norrmalm, on the eastern side of Gustav Adolfs torg across from the former Arvfurstens palats, now the Ministry for Foreign Affairs. It lies on the north side of the Norrström River and is connected to the Royal Palace through the Norrbro Bridge.

Other historically and architecturally important buildings in the close neighbourhood are the Sager House, the official residence of the Prime Minister of Sweden, and the Parliament House.

== History ==
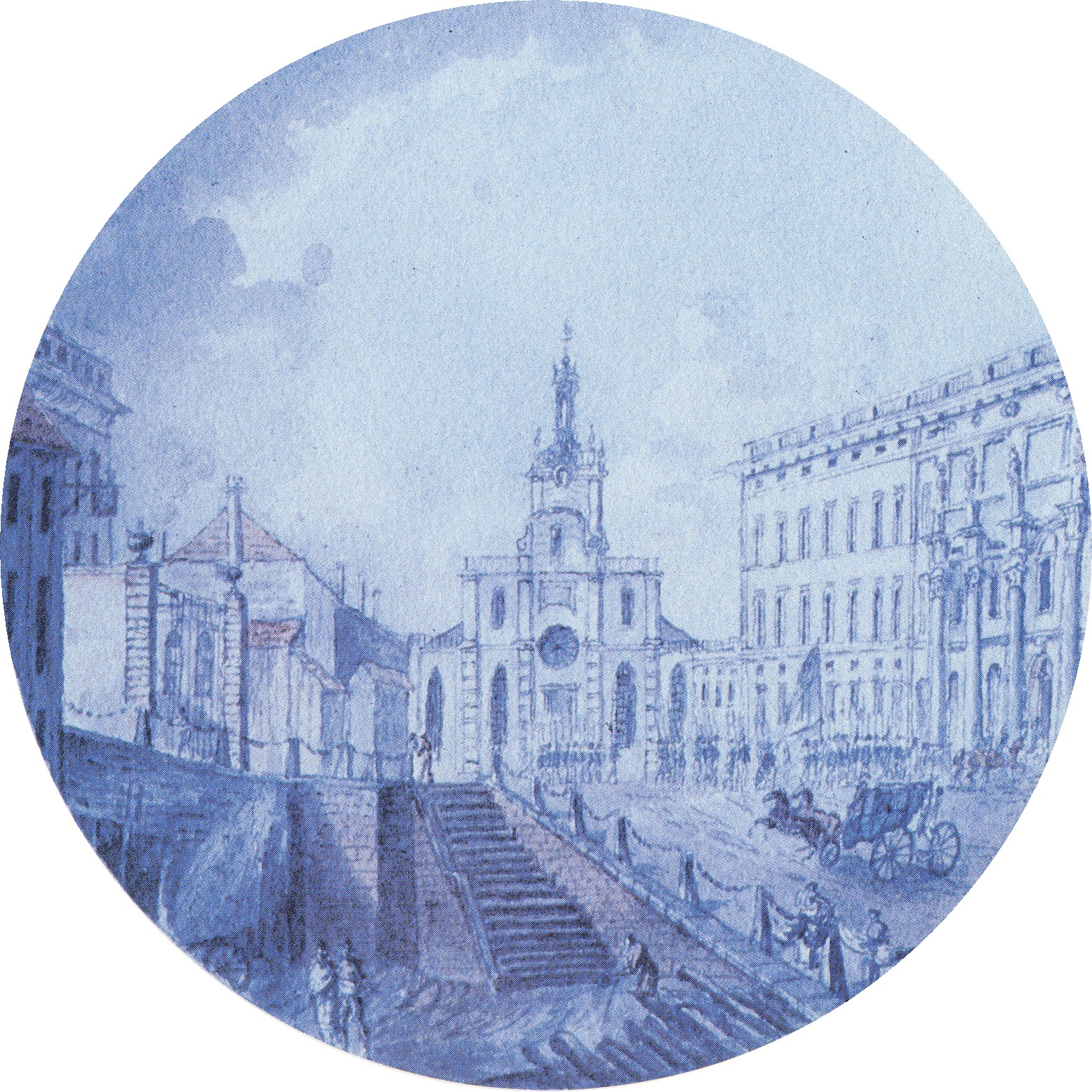
The original building of the Royal Swedish Opera, Bollhuset at Slottsbacken in Stockholm, during the 1780s. From right to left: Stockholm Palace, Storkyrkan, Bollhuset Theatre and the Tessin Palace. Drawing by Martin Rudolf Heland.

The opera company was founded with the Royal Swedish Academy of Music by King Gustav III, and its first performance, Thetis and Phelée with Carl Stenborg and Elisabeth Olin, was given on 18 January 1773; this was the first native-speaking opera performed in Sweden.

However, the first opera house was not opened until 1782 and served for a century before being replaced at the end of the 19th century. Both houses are officially called the "Royal Opera", although the terms "The Gustavian Opera" and "The Oscarian Opera" or the "Old" and "New" Opera are used when distinction is needed.

=== The Gustavian Opera ===
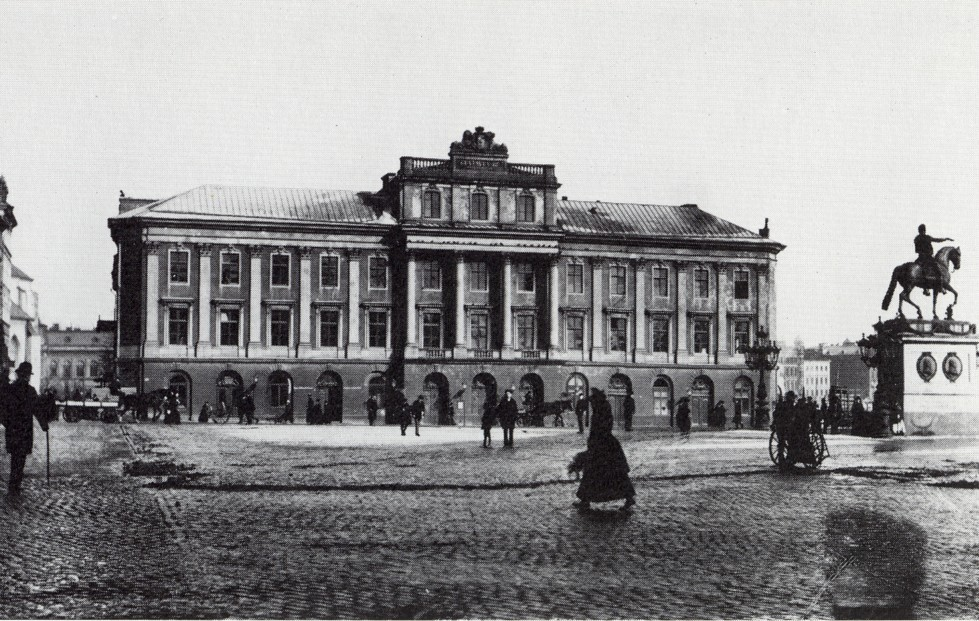
The Gustavian opera building in 1880

The original Stockholm Opera House, the work of architect Carl Fredrik Adelcrantz, was commissioned by King Gustav III, a strong adherent of the ideal of enlightened absolutism and, as such, was a great patron of the arts. The Swedish Opera Company had first been located in Bollhuset, but there was a need to separate the opera from the theatre and give them separate buildings. Construction began in 1775, and the theatre was inaugurated on 30 September 1782 with a performance of the German composer Johann Gottlieb Naumann's Cora och Alonzo. It was also the place for public masquerade balls, events inspired by the famous opera balls in Paris, which were open for everyone wearing a mask at a cheap cost and somewhat ill-reputed.

The building was very imposing, with its centre Corinthian tetrastyle portico supporting four statues and topped by the royal crown. The four-tiered auditorium was oval in shape and had excellent acoustics and sight lines. The sumptuous foyer contained neoclassic medallions and pilasters.

It was in the foyer of the opera house where the king met his fate: during a masquerade on 16 March 1792, he was shot by Jacob Johan Anckarström and died 13 days later. (In turn, this event inspired the operas Gustave III by Daniel Auber and Un ballo in maschera by Verdi.) Following the assassination, the opera house was closed until 1 November 1792, when it was opened again, which by some was considered shocking. The son of Gustav III, King Gustav IV Adolf of Sweden, did not like the opera, possibly because of the murder of his father, and disliked the fact that the scene of his father's murder was used as a place of amusement and leisure, and when a frivolous play was performed for his queen Frederica of Baden in 1806, he decided to close it down. It remained closed until 1809, and when the king was deposed, it took until May 1812 before it was organised enough to be fully opened again.

=== The Oscarian Opera, Operan ===
Share of the Kongl. Teaterns AB, issued 1 July 1898

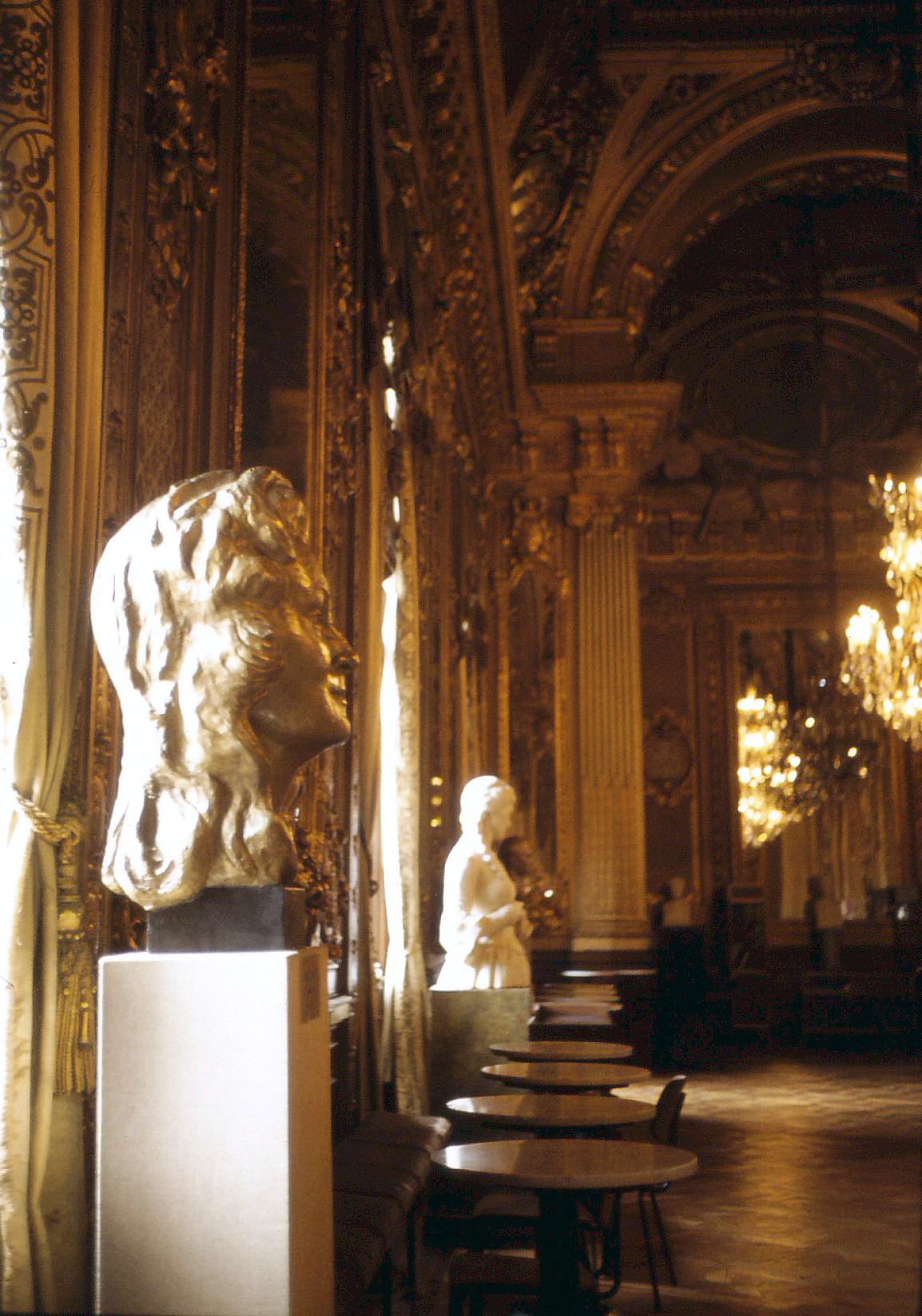
Operans Guldfoajén: The Golden Hall (with a bust of Swedish singer Birgit Nilsson) at the Royal Swedish Opera

The old opera was demolished in 1892 to give way to the construction of a new Opera drawn by Axel Johan Anderberg, which was finished seven years later and inaugurated by King Oscar II with a production of a Swedish opera (that tradition had been quite firmly established during the 19th century), Franz Berwald's Estrella de Soria.

The new house had the letters Kungl. Teatern, literally "Royal Theatre" (which caused the later-founded Royal Dramatic Theatre to add the distinction "dramatic" to its name). The building is now simply called Operan ("The Opera"), written in golden letters above the middle arch on the front facade. It is a neo-classical building with a gold foyer (Guldfoajén) and marble grand staircase leading to a three-tiered auditorium somewhat smaller than the old theatre. It presently seats 1,200. Most productions are now sung in the original language (with Swedish subtitles), with only a few in Swedish.

The Royal Swedish Family of King Carl XVI Gustaf keeps the Royal Box reserved, located in the first tier in the auditorium above the orchestra pit.

== Ensembles, artists and artistic leadership ==
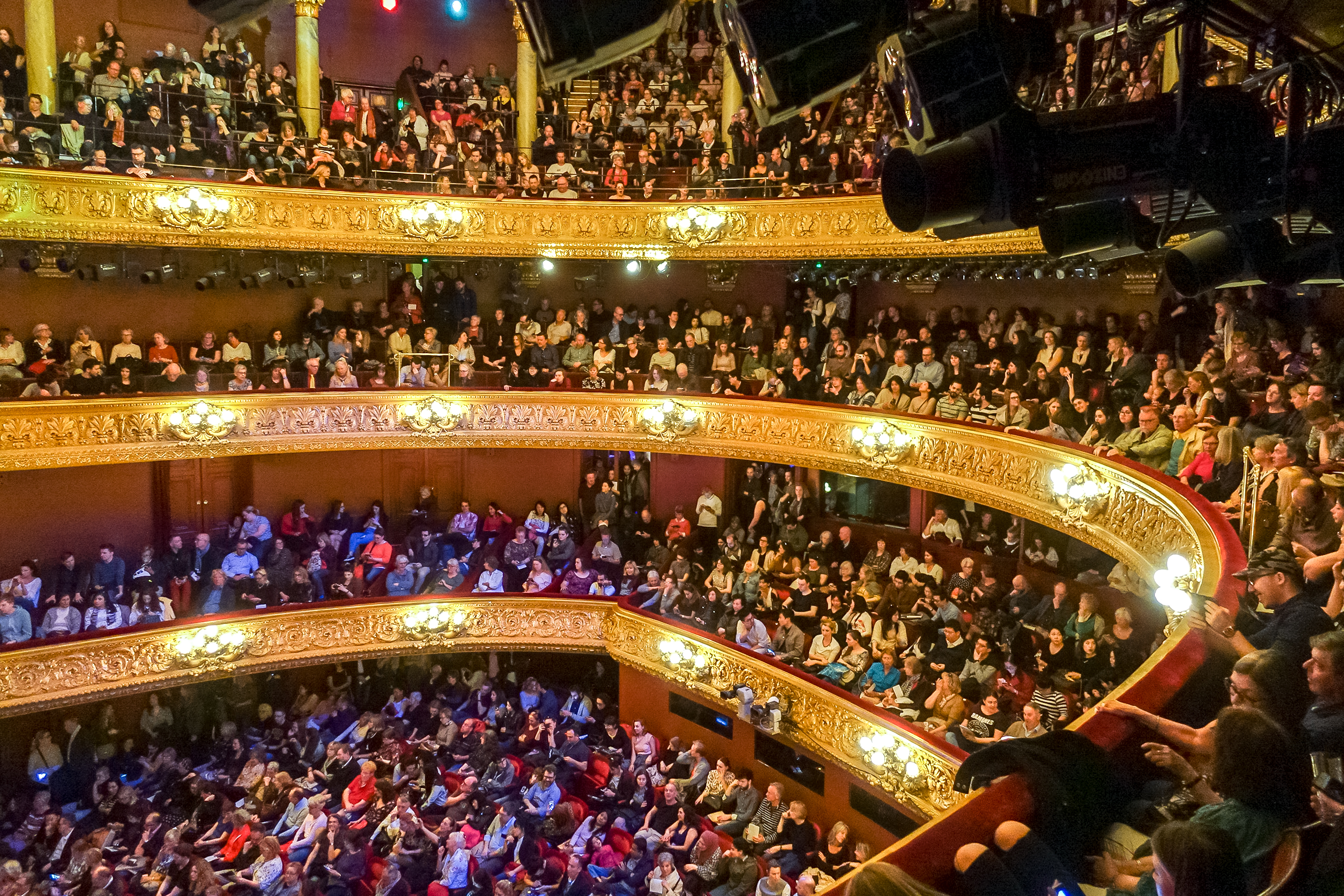
Interior of the Opera

Famous singers who have been part of the opera's ensemble have included Jussi Björling, Gösta Winbergh, Nicolai Gedda, Peter Mattei, Jenny Lind, Birgit Nilsson, Elisabeth Söderström, Fritz Arlberg, Anne Sofie von Otter, Katarina Dalayman and Nina Stemme.

The orchestra of the Royal Swedish Opera, the Royal Swedish Orchestra, Kungliga Hovkapellet, dates back to 1526. Royal housekeeping accounts from 1526 mention twelve musicians, including wind players and a timpanist, but no string players. Consequently, the Royal Swedish Orchestra is one of the oldest orchestras in Europe.

Armas Järnefelt was on the music staff from 1905, rising to become chief conductor between 1923–1933 and 1938–1946. The Royal Swedish Ballet, Kungliga Baletten, was founded by King Gustav III in 1773.

Past general managers of the Royal Swedish Opera have included Birgitta Svendén, who served in the post until her retirement in 2022. The current general manager of the company is Fredrik Lindgren, since 1 July 2022.

In November 2020, the company announced the appointment of Michael Cavanagh as its next artistic director, effective in the summer of 2021, with an initial contract of 5 years. Cavanagh held the post until his death in March 2024. In August 2024, the company announced the appointment of Tobias Theorell as its next artistic director, effective in 2025.

Past titled conductors with the company have included Lawrence Renes, who held the post from 2012 through 2017. In January 2020, the company announced the appointment of Alan Gilbert as its next music director, effective in the spring of 2021. Gilbert had first guest-conducted with the company in 2012.
