= List of compositions by Lars-Erik Larsson =

The following is an incomplete list of compositions by Lars-Erik Larsson.

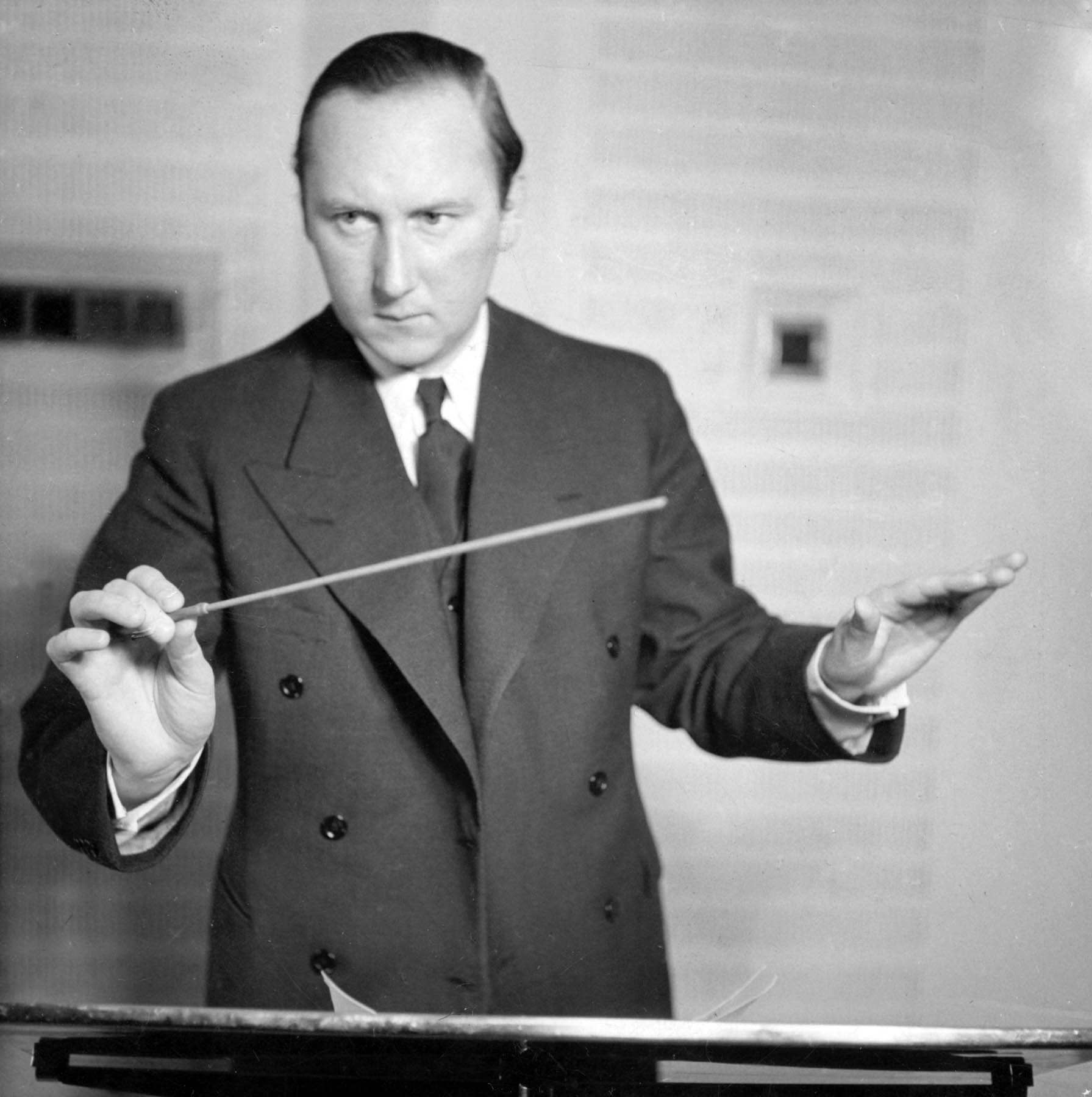
Lars-Erik Larsson

== Orchestral works ==
=== Symphonies ===
- Symphony No. 1 in D major, for orchestra (Op. 2, 1927–1928; withdrawn, unpublished)

1. Allegro moderato—Andante cantabile—Tempo I—Andante cantabile—Tempo I—Largamente
2. Adagio—Un poco più mosso—Tempo I
3. Scherzo. Allegro vivace—Trio. Meno mosso—Scherzo da capo
4. Finale. Allegro con spirito—Allegro festivo

- Symphonic Sketch (Symfonisk skiss), for orchestra (Op. 5, 1930) (Note: No studio recording has been made of the Symphonic Sketch (Op. 5). However, based on an archival recording from Swedish Radio, it appears to be a short piece, about 6 minutes in duration, that is scored for orchestra.)
- Sinfonietta, for string orchestra (Op. 10, 1932; later disowned; published by Universal Edition)

1. Allegro
2. Largo—Presto—Largo
3. Allegro

- Symphony No. 2 in E minor, for orchestra (Op. 17, 1936–1937; withdrawn, unpublished)

1. Allegro con moto—Allegro molto vivace
2. Andante—Allegro alla marcia—Andante—Molto tranquillo
3. Ostinato. Moderato—Prestissimo–Lento

- Ostinato, for orchestra (Op. 17, 1936–1937; Movement IV of the Second Symphony published by Gehrmans Musikförlag as a stand-alone concert piece)
- Symphony No. 3 in C minor, for orchestra (Op. 34, 1944–1945; withdrawn, unpublished)

1. Allegro con brio
2. Adagio ma non troppo
3. Prestissimo—Trio. Andante—Scherzo da capo
4. Andante maestoso—Allegro molto

- Concert Overture No. 3 (Konsertouverture Nr. 3), for orchestra (Op. 34, 1944–1945; Movement IV of the Third Symphony—with a new introduction (c. 1946)—published by Gehrmans Musikförlag as a stand-alone concert piece)

=== Concertante ===
- Saxophone Concerto, for alto saxophone and string orchestra (Op. 14, 1934, revised c. early 1980s; (Note: In the 1980s, Larsson "simplified" the Saxophone Concerto to make it "more accessible" for soloists who lacked the "special effects" of the piece's dedicatee, the "pioneering saxophone virtuoso" Sigurd Raschèr.) published by Gehrmans Musikförlag)

1. Allegro molto moderato
2. Adagio
3. Allegro scherzando

- Cello Concerto, for cello and orchestra (Op. 37, 1946–1947) (Note: Details about the Cello Concerto—in particular the tempo markings for its three movements—come from a WorldCat record of the score: OCLC 52639647.)

1. Allegro risoluto
2. Largo
3. Allegro moderato

- Violin Concerto, for violin and orchestra (Op. 42, 1952; new cadenza composed in 1976; published by Gehrmans Musikförlag)

1. Moderato
2. Andante pastorale
3. Lento—Allegro molto (Note: Although the publisher, Gehrmans Musikförlag, lists the third movement of the Violin Concerto as "Allegro molto", the liner notes to Sony Classical's recording of the work denotes it as "Lento". The manuscript that the publisher provides on its website has the movement as "Lento" (p. 76 of the score), which later transitions into "Allegro molto" (p. 80).)

- Twelve Concertinos, for various soloists and string orchestra (Op. 45, 1953–1957) (Note: Larsson's objective for the series was to provide Sweden's state-sponsored amateur orchestras (which, from 1945 to 1947, he had been appointed to inspect) with a modern but technically-feasible repertoire.)

- Flute Concertino (Op. 45/1, 1955; published by Gehrmans Musikförlag)

1. Rondino: Allegretto grazioso
2. Arietta: Andante tranquillo
3. Finale: Allegro vivace

- Oboe Concertino (Op. 45/2, 1955; published by Gehrmans Musikförlag)

1. Allegro risoluto
2. Andante espressivo
3. Finale: Allegro moderato

- Clarinet Concertino (Op. 45/3, 1957; published by Gehrmans Musikförlag)

1. Allegro
2. Andante
3. Finale: Presto

- Bassoon Concertino (Op. 45/4, 1955; published by Gehrmans Musikförlag)

1. Allegro moderato
2. Larghetto
3. Finale: Allegro molto

- Horn Concertino (Op. 45/5, 1955; published by Gehrmans Musikförlag)

1. Allegro moderato
2. Lento cantabile
3. Finale: Allegro vivace

- Trumpet Concertino (Op. 45/6, 1954; published by Gehrmans Musikförlag)

1. Allegro moderato
2. Ritornell: Andante semplice
3. Allegro risoluto

- Trombone Concertino (Op. 45/7, 1955; published by Gehrmans Musikförlag)

1. Preludium: Allegro pomposo
2. Aria: Andante sostenuto
3. Finale: Allegro giocoso

- Violin Concertino (Op. 45/8, 1956; published by Gehrmans Musikförlag)

1. Allegro moderato
2. Cavatina: Andante con moto—Tranquillo
3. Finale: Allegro vivace

- Viola Concertino (Op. 45/9, 1957; published by Gehrmans Musikförlag)

1. Moderato
2. Andante espressivo—Allegretto—Andante espressivo
3. Finale: Allegro—Moderato—Allegro

- Cello Concertino (Op. 45/10, 1956; published by Gehrmans Musikförlag)

1. Allegro moderato
2. Siciliano: Andante sostenuto
3. Finale: Allegro moderato ma ritmico

- Double Bass Concertino (Op. 45/11, 1957; published by Gehrmans Musikförlag)

1. Ballad: Moderato
2. Arioso: Lento
3. Finale: Allegro vivace

- Piano Concertino (Op. 45/12, 1957; published by Gehrmans Musikförlag)

1. Allegro molto
2. Andante con moto
3. Finale: Allegro scherzando—Andante pastorale—Allegro molto

=== Stage works ===
- The Princess from Cyprus (Prinsessan av Cypern), opera in four acts for soloists, mixed chorus, and orchestra (Op. 9, 1930–1937; withdrawn, unpublished); text by Zacharias Topelius
- The Arrest on Bohus (Arresten på Bohus), opera buffa for soloists, mixed chorus, and orchestra (1938–1939; unpublished)
- Sankta Lucia, incidental music for narrator, five soloists, mixed choir, and orchestra (Op. 36, 1946); text by Martin Hagenfeldt
- Linden, folk-dance ballet (en folkvisebalett) in one act comprising four scenes (Op. 46, 1957–1958)

1. Summer (Sommaren)
2. Autumn (Hösten)
3. Winter (Vintern)
4. Spring (Våren)

=== Vocalists and orchestra ===
- A Fiddler's Last Journey (En spelmans jordafard), ballad for baritone and orchestra (Op. 1, 1927)
- The Bright Country (Det ljusa landet), cantata for soprano, baritone, mixed chorus, and orchestra (Op. 11, 1932)

1. Wandering (Vandering)
2. Summer Morning (Sommarmorgon)
3. The Temple (Templet)
4. The Heart (Hjärta)
5. The Song (Sången)

- Invocatio, for chorus and orchestra (Op. 21, 1938)
- God in Disguise (Förklädd gud), lyrical suite (lyrisksvit) for narrator, soprano, baritone, chorus, and orchestra to a poem by Hjalmar Gullberg (Op. 24, 1940) (Note: Along with Gullberg, Larsson developed a genre of popular entertainment called the "lyrical suite", which alternated recited poetry with musical interludes. Four of the 10 numbers that comprise God in Disguise are recitations of Gullberg's narrative poem; these verses are not included here in the above list, which details the musical movements only.)

1. Prelude (Förspel): Andante tranquillo
2. Allegro moderato
3. Agitato
4. Alla marcia
5. Andantino quasi allegretto
6. Andante—Andante molto tranquillo

- Watchman's Songs (Väktarsånger), for baritone, male chorus, and orchestra (Op. 25, 1940); text by Karl Ragnar Gierow
- Voices from Skansen (Röster från Skansen), lyric suite for narrator, baritone, chorus, and orchestra (Op. 26, 1941)
- The Red Cross (Det röda korset), cantata for narrator, baritone, chorus, and orchestra (Op. 30, 1944)
- The Sundial and the Urn (Soluret och urnan), cantata for baritone, mixed chorus, and orchestra (Op. 53, 1966); text by Karl Ragnar Gierow

=== Other orchestral ===
- Concert Overture No. 1 (Konsertouverture Nr. 1), for orchestra (Op. 4, 1929)
- Divertimento No. 1, for chamber orchestra (Op. 7, 1931–1932; withdrawn)
- Little Serenade (Liten serenad), for string orchestra (Op. 12, 1934; published by Universal Edition)

1. Allegro
2. Adagio cantabile
3. Allegro vivace
4. Allegro

- Concert Overture No. 2 (Konsertouverture Nr. 2), for orchestra (Op. 13, 1934; published by Universal Edition)
- Divertimento No. 2, for chamber orchestra (Op. 15, 1935; published by Universal Edition)

1. Allegro con spirito
2. Adagio
3. Presto

- A Winter's Tale (En vintersaga), four vignettes for orchestra after Shakespeare [excerpted from the lyrical suite by the same name] (Op. 18, 1937–1938)

1. Siciliana: Andantino
2. Intermezzo: Allegro leggiero
3. Pastoral: Allegretto pastorale
4. Epilogue (Epilog): Andante

- The Hours of Day (Dagens stunder), lyrical suite for orchestra to poems by Erik Blomberg, Kerstin Hed, Oscar Levertin, Erik Lindorm, and Verner von Heidenstam (1937–1938); † = Not included in the Pastoral Suite

1. Adagio—Allegro
2. Andantino con moto^{†}
3. Adagio
4. Vivice
5. Andantino^{†}
6. Andante tranquillo^{†}

- Pastoral Suite (Pastoralsvit), suite for orchestra excerpted from The Hours of Day (Op. 19, 1937–1938)

1. Overture (Uvertyr): Adagio—Allegro
2. Romance (Romans): Adagio
3. Scherzo: Vivice

- The Earth Sings (Jorden sjunger), for narrator and orchestra (Op. 23, 1940)
- Festmusik, for orchestra (Op. 22, 1939)
- The Earth Sings (Jorden sjunger), for narrator and orchestra (Op. 23, 1940)
- The Swedish Nation (Det svenska landet), lyrical suite for chamber orchestra (Op. 27, 1941)

Note: Folk-song Night (Folkvisenatt), for string orchestra is from this suite)

- Gustavian Suite (Gustaviansk svit), for flute, harpsichord, and string orchestra (Op. 28, 1944); excerpted from the film score to The Royal Hunt (Kungajakt)

1. Entrada
2. Pastorale
3. Andante grazioso
4. Arietta
5. Festivo

- Two Pieces, for orchestra (Op. 32, 1944)

1. ?
2. ?

- Music for Orchestra (Musik för orkester) (Op. 40, 1949)

1. Andante teneramente—Tranquillo—Allegro molto
2. Andante elegiaco
3. Allegro

- Adagio, for string orchestra (Op. 48, 1960)
- Three Orchestral Pieces (Tre Orkesterstyken) (Op. 49, 1960)

1. Adagio
2. Presto
3. Adagio

- Variations for Orchestra (Orkestervariationer) (Op. 50, 1962)
- Lyric Fantasy (Lyrisk fantasi), for little orchestra (Op. 54, 1967)
- Due auguri, for orchestra (Op. 62, 1971; published by Gehrmans Musikförlag) (Note: Details about Due auguri—in particular the tempo markings for its two movements—come from a WorldCat record of the score: OCLC 17599824.)

1. Omaggio conservatorio
2. Ricamo all'Accademia

- Barococo (Råå-rokoko), suite for orchestra (Op. 64, 1973)

1. Entrata
2. Gavott (Gavotte)
3. Serenata
4. Menuett
5. Barkarol (Barcarolle)
6. Kadrilj (Quadrille) and Galopp (Galop)

- Musica permutatio, for orchestra (Op. 66, 1980)

== Chamber ==
=== Quartets and quintets ===
- Late Autumn Leaves (Senhöstblad), lyrical suite for string quartet to poems by Ola Hansson (1938); † = Not included in Intimate Miniatures

1. Allegro moderato
2. Allegretto^{†}
3. Andante sostenuto
4. Andantino—Allegro moderato—Andantino^{†}
5. Allegro
6. Adagio

- Intimate Miniatures (Intima miniatyrer), suite for string quartet excerpted from Late Autumn Leaves (Op. 20, 1938; published by Gehrmans Musikförlag)

1. Adagio
2. Allegro moderato
3. Andante sostenuto
4. Allegro

- String Quartet No. 1 in D minor (Op. 31, 1944)

1. Allegro ma non troppo
2. Adagio—Allegro giocoso—Adagio
3. Molto vivace

- String Quartet No. 2, Quartetto alla serenata (Op. 44, 1955; published by Gehrmans Musikförlag)

1. Allegro giocoso
2. Canzonetta: Andantino
3. Andante tranquillo—Allegro vivace

- Allegro vivace, for string quartet; Movement V from Five Sketches (Fem skisser), a collaborative work with Moses Pergament, Edvin Kallstenius, Sven-Erik Bäck, and Erland von Koch
- Quattro tempi, divertimento for wind quintet, i.e., flute, oboe, clarinet, horn, and bassoon (Op. 55, 1968; published by Gehrmans Musikförlag)

1. Tranquillo
2. Agitato—Sostenuto
3. Giocoso

- Aubade, for oboe and string trio, i.e., violin, viola, and cello (Op. 63, 1972; published by Gehrmans Musikförlag)

1. Lento
2. Allegro

- String Quartet No. 3 (Op. 65, 1975; published by Gehrmans Musikförlag)

1. Allegro
2. Allegretto—Presto—Allegretto
3. Largo

=== Duos ===
- Violin Sonatina in G minor, for violin and piano (Op. 3, 1928; published by Gehrmans Musikförlag)

1. ???
2. ???
3. ???

- Duo, for violin and viola (Op. 6, 1931)
- Cello Sonatina, for cello and piano (Op. 60, 1969; published by Gehrmans Musikförlag)

1. Allegretto
2. ???
3. ???

- Three Pieces (Tre stycken), for clarinet and piano (Op. 61, 1970; published by Gehrmans Musikförlag)

1. Sonatina
2. Arioso
3. Jigg

== Piano ==
- Summer Evenings (Sommarkvällar) (1926; published by Gehrmans Musikförlag)

1. A Walking Song (Gångtrall)
2. Evening Mood (Aftonstämning)
3. Intermezzo: Mosquito Dance (Myggdans)
4. Age of Fairies (Älvlek)
5. Moon Hymn (Månhymn)
6. On a Nighttime Walk(På nattvandring)

- Three Poems (Tre poem) (1926; published by Gehrmans Musikförlag)

1. Allegro moderato
2. Andante espressivo
3. Tempo di menuetto (med humor)

- Two Humoresques (Två humoresker (1926; published by Gehrmans Musikförlag) (Note: Details about the Two Humoresques—in particular the tempo markings for its two movements—come from a WorldCat record of the score: OCLC 301893327.)

1. Motiv E.B.B.A.
2. Motiv B.E.B.S.

- Ten Two-part Piano Pieces (Tio tvåstämmiga pianostycken) (Op. 8, 1932)
- Piano Sonatina No. 1 (Op. 16, 1936; published by Universal Edition)

1. Allegro con moto
2. Intermezzo: Allegretto
3. Lento espressivo
4. Presto

- Croquiser (Op. 38, 1947; published by Gehrmans Musikförlag)

1. Capriccioso
2. Grazioso
3. Semplice
4. Scherzando
5. Espressivo
6. Ritmico

- Piano Sonatina No. 2 (Op. 39, 1946–1947; published by Gehrmans Musikförlag)

1. Allegro
2. Andante
3. Allegro

- Piano Sonatina No. 3 (Op. 41, 1950; published by Gehrmans Musikförlag)

1. Allegro
2. Andante
3. Allegro

- Twelve Little Piano Pieces (Tolv små pianostycken; (Op. 47, 1960) published by Gehrmans Musikförlag)
- Easy Pieces (Lätta spelstycken) (Op. 56, 1969; published by Gehrmans Musikförlag)
- Five Piano Pieces (Fem pianostycken) (Op. 57, 1969; published by Gehrmans Musikförlag)

1. Humoresque (Humoresk)
2. Barcarole (Barkarol)
3. Burlesque (Burlesk)
4. Valse-Caprice
5. Perpetuum mobile

- Seven Little Fugues with Preludes in the Old Style (Sju små fugor med preludier i gammal stil) (Op. 58, 1969; published by Gehrmans Musikförlag)

== To do ==
- 1944 Op. 29, Four songs
- 1945 Op. 33, Two songs
- 1946 Op. 35, Nine Gullberg Songs
- 1954 Op. 43, Missa Brevis, for mixed chorus
- 1964 Op. 51, Intrada Solemnis, for trumpets, trombones, double choir, boys choir and organ
- 1964 Op. 52, Eight songs
- 1969 Op. 59, Tre Citat, for choir

== Notes, references, and sources ==
Notes

Sources

- Bergendal, Göran (2001a) [1972]. 33 nya svenska komponister. Kungl. Musikaliska Akademien. ISBN 9789189038219.
- Bergendal, Göran (2001b). Lars-Erik Larsson: Konsertuvertyr Nr. 2 / En spelmans jordafärd / Sinfonietta / Det ljusa landet (CD booklet). Translated by Zetterqvist, Cynthia; Betteridge, Neil. Stefan Parkland & Sami Sinfonietta. Musica Svecae. p. 11–14. PSCD 714. OCLC 811456646
- Friedner, Calle (2008). Lars-Erik Larsson: String Quartets (CD booklet). Translated by Tanner, Roger. Stenhammar Quartet. Daphne. p. 4–9. DAPHNE 1035. OCLC 840087298
- Nyström, Martin (1993). Lars-Erik Larsson: Förklädd Gud (God in Disguise) / Pastoral Suite / Violin Concerto (CD booklet). Esa-Pekka Salonen & Swedish Radio Symphony Orchestra. Sony Classical. p. 6–7. SK 64140. OCLC 34697048
- Schlüren, Christoph (2014). Lars-Erik Larsson: Symphony No. 1 / Music for Orchestra / Lyric Fantasy (CD booklet). Translated by Robinson, J. Bradford. Andrew Manze & Helsingborg Symphony Orchestra. cpo. p. 13–17. 777 671–2. OCLC 880851753
- Schlüren, Christoph (2015a). Lars-Erik Larsson: Symphony No. 2 / Variations, Op. 50 / Barococo Suite, Op. 64 (CD booklet). Translated by Robinson, J. Bradford. Andrew Manze & Helsingborg Symphony Orchestra. cpo. p. 14–20. 777 672–2. OCLC 965545444
- Schlüren, Christoph (2015b). Lars-Erik Larsson: Symphony No. 3 / Three Orchestra Pieces / Adagio, Op. 48 / Musica permutatio, Op. 66 (CD booklet). Translated by Robinson, J. Bradford. Andrew Manze & Helsingborg Symphony Orchestra. cpo. p. 12–17. 777 673–2. OCLC 1054982167
- Skans, Per (1984). Saxophone Concerti (CD booklet). Jorma Panula & New Stockholm Chamber Orchestra. BIS. p. 4–6. CD–218. OCLC 11863759
- Skans, Per (1991). Lars-Erik Larsson: Twelve Concertinos, Op. 45 (CD booklet). Various artists. BIS. p. 8–9. CD–473/474. OCLC 25292700
- Unge, Sören (1996). Lars-Erik Larsson: Piano Music (CD booklet). Hans Pålsson. BIS. p. 3–6. CD–758. OCLC 36399341
- "[Movement 5 from] Five Sketches for String Quartet". swedishmusicalheritage.com. The Royal Swedish Academy of Music. 2022.
