= Pastoral Suite =

Lyric suite by Lars-Erik Larsson

- by Lars-Erik Larsson
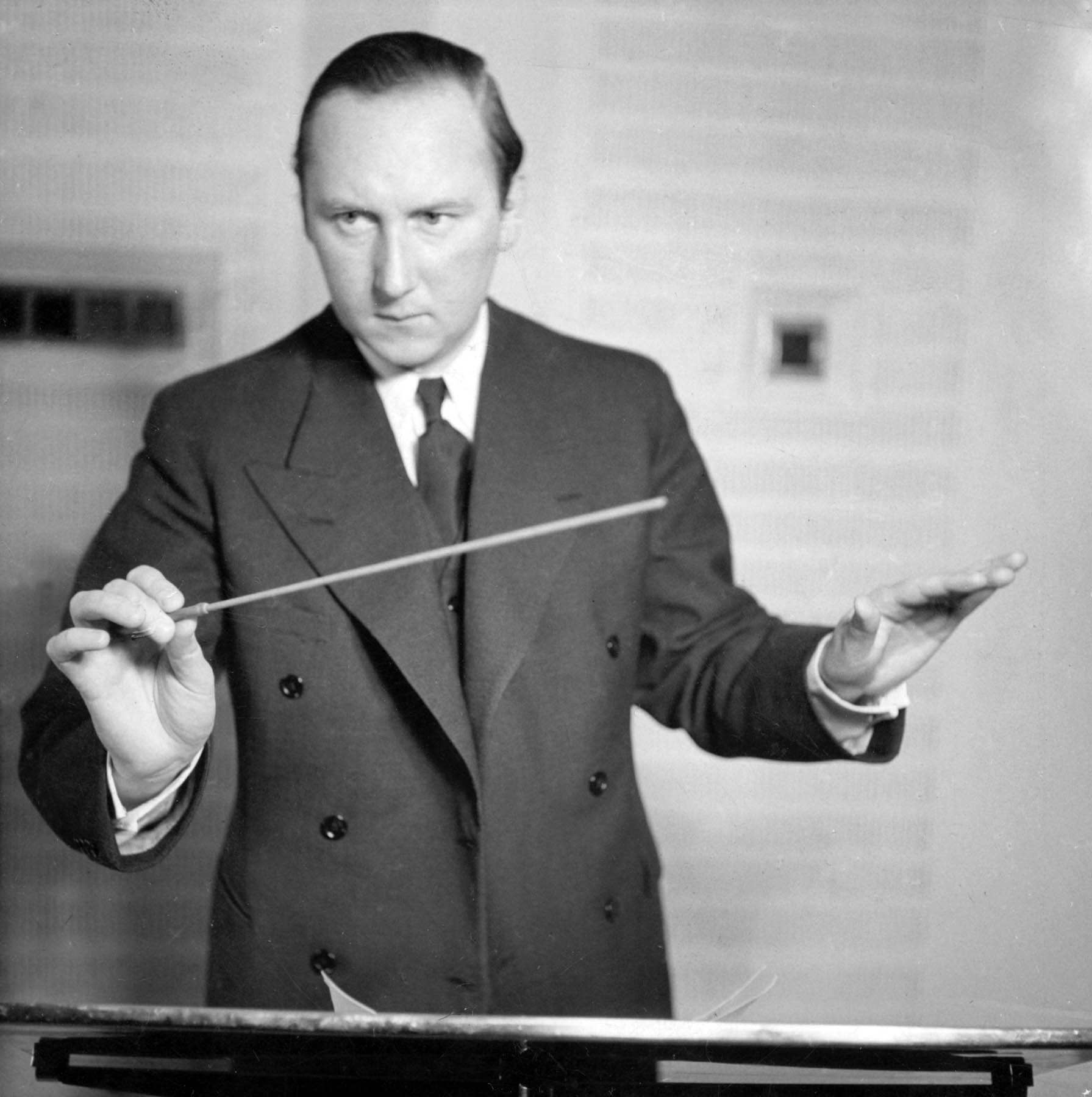
- The composer
- Native name: Pastoralsvit
- Opus: 19
- Composed: 1938
- Publisher: Gehrmans Musikförlag (1942)
- Duration: Approx. 12 minutes
- Movements: 3

Premiere
- Date: 11 October 1938
- Location: Stockholm, Sweden
- Conductor: Lars-Erik Larsson
- Performers: Radio Entertainment Orchestra

The Pastoral Suite (in Swedish: Pastoralsvit), Op. 19, is a three-movement suite for orchestra written in 1938 by Swedish composer Lars-Erik Larsson. The suite remains not only one of Larsson's most celebrated compositions, but also one of the most frequently performed pieces of Swedish art music. In particular, the Romance (No. 2) is often performed and recorded as a stand-alone concert piece.

== Background ==
Beginning in 1937, the Swedish Broadcasting Corporation—the country's national, publicly-funded radio—employed Larsson as a composer-in-residence, music producer, and conductor; his main task was to write music to accompany various radio programs. One of Larsson's colleagues was the Swedish poet Hjalmar Gullberg, who had joined Swedish Radio the year before and headed its drama division. Together, the two men developed a genre of popular entertainment they called the "lyrical suite", (Note: The original Swedish is "lyrisk svit".) which alternated recited poetry with musical interludes. Larsson's first commission of this type was to compose four orchestral vignettes to accompany the 1938 radio recitation of a Swedish-language translation Shakespeare's The Winter's Tale; he subsequently published these as A Winter's Tale (En vintersaga; Op. 18).

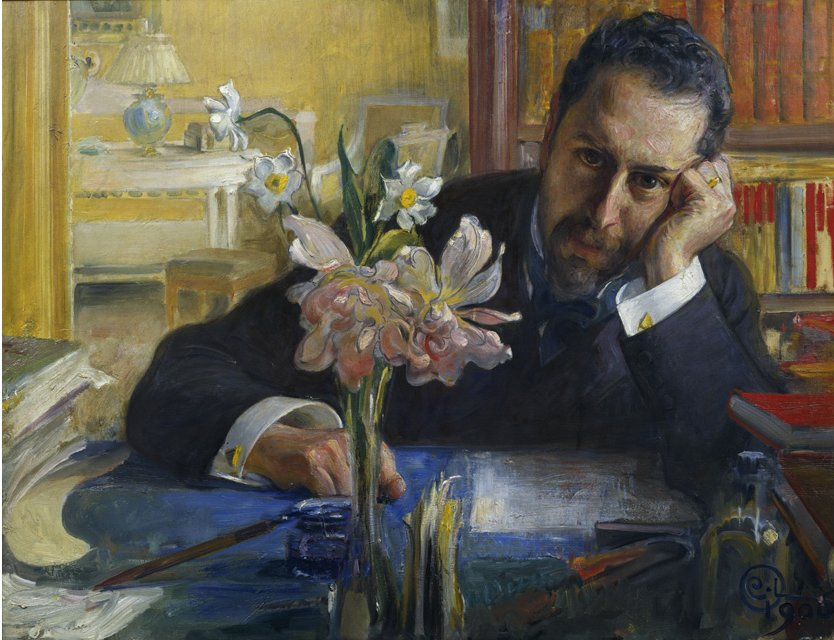
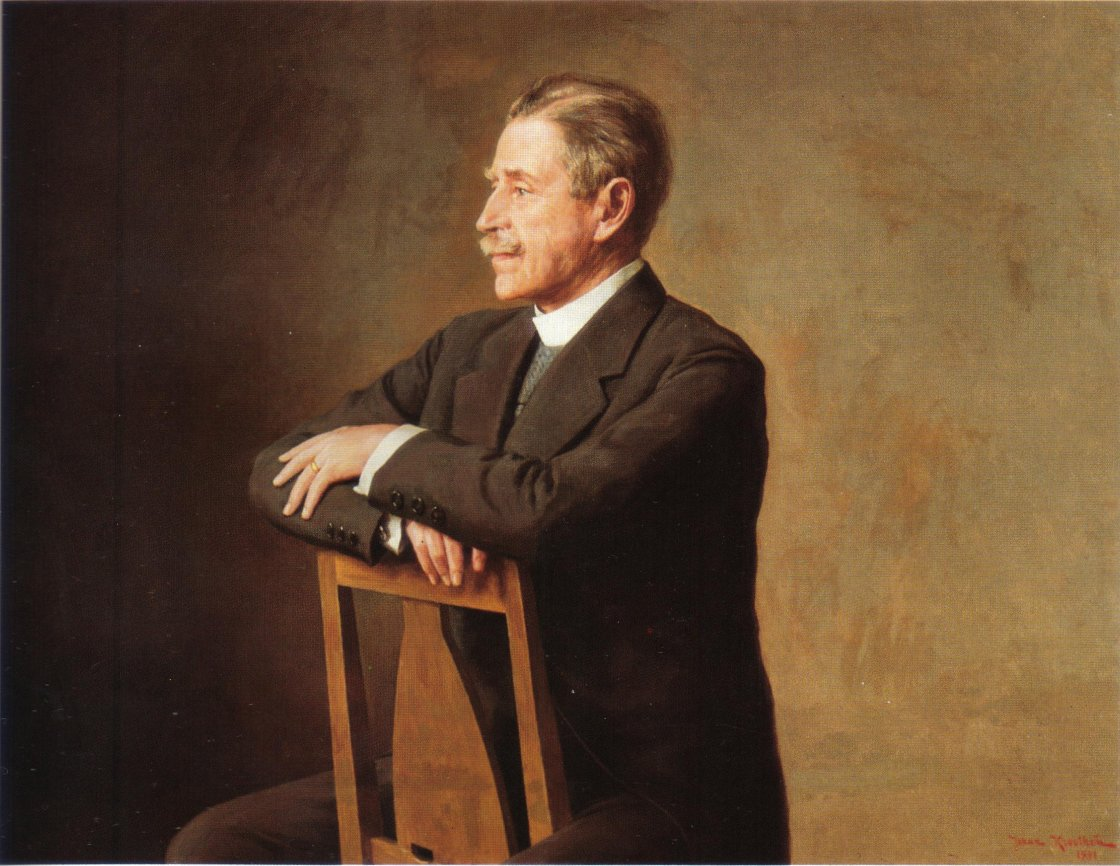
Originally, the Pastoral Suite was part of a "lyrical suite" called The Hours of the Day; this featured poems by, among others, Verner von Heidenstam (bottom) and Oscar Levertin (top).

After the success of A Winter's Tale, Larsson began composing a second lyrical suite for Swedish Radio: The Hours of the Day (Dagens stunder). (Note: Dagens stunder is sometimes translated to English as Moments of the Day or Times of Day.) He contributed six orchestral movements to accompany six poems by various Swedish authors:

- No. 1: Adagio
  Recitation: A Day (En dag) by Verner von Heidenstam
- No. 1 (cont.): Allegro
  Recitation: The Earth Sings (Jorden sjunger) by Erik Blomberg
- No. 2: Andantino con moto
  Recitation: Siesta by Oscar Levertin
- No. 3: Adagio
  Recitation: The Two Tones (De två tonerna) by Kerstin Hed
- No. 4: Vivice
  Recitation: An Afternoon (En eftermiddag) by Erik Lindorm
- No. 5: Andantino
  Recitation: Man's Home (Människans hem) by Erik Blomberg
- No. 6: Andante tranquillo

The Hours of the Day—and, by extension, what would later become the Pastoral Suite—premiered over Swedish Radio on 11 October 1938, with Larsson conducting the Radio Entertainment Orchestra (Radiotjänsts Underhållningsorkester) in Stockholm; the Swedish actor Gunnar Sjöberg read the first, second, third, and fifth poems, while the Swedish actress Gunn Wållgren read the third and fourth poems. Afterwards, Larsson excerpted Nos. 1, 3, and 4 as the Pastoral Suite, while Nos. 2, 5, and 6 faded into obscurity. (Note: In 1992, James DePreist and the Malmö Symphony Orchestra made the world premiere studio recording of the complete six-movement The Hours of the Day (Dagens stunder), which lasts 22:29. In 2003, Mats Rondin and the Norrköping Symphony Orchestra also recorded the complete The Hours of the Day (21:34).)

== Structure ==
The Pastoral Suite, which lasts about 12 to 13 minutes, is in three movements. They are as follows:

1. Overture (Uvertyr): Adagio—Allegro
2. Romance (Romans): Adagio
3. Scherzo: Vivace

As a whole, the piece is in the neoclassical style that was "fashionable" in Swedish between the two world wars. In the Scherzo, Larsson's writing recalls the concerto grosso form.

== Instrumentation ==
The Pastoral Suite is scored the following instruments:

- Woodwinds: 2 flutes, 2 oboes, 2 clarinets (in B♭), and 2 bassoons
- Brass: 2 horns (in F) and 2 trumpets (in C)
- Percussion: timpani
- Strings: violins, violas, cellos, and double basses

The two outer movements are for full orchestras, whereas the central Romance is for strings. Gehrmans Musikförlag published the suite in 1942.

== Recordings ==
The sortable table below lists commercially available recordings of the Pastoral Suite:

| No. | Conductor | Orchestra | Rec. (Note: Refers to the year in which the performers recorded the work; this may not be the same as the year in which the recording was first released to the general public.) | Time | Recording venue | Label | Ref. |
|---|---|---|---|---|---|---|---|
| 1 | Stig Westerberg (1) | Stockholm Radio Orchestra | 1952 | ? | ? | Decca | (Note: S. Westerberg–Decca (LX 3086) 1953) |
| 2 | Stig Westerberg (2) | Stockholm Symphony Orchestra | 1960 | 12:21 | Stockholm Concert Hall | Swedish Society Discofil | (Note: S. Westerberg–Swedish Society (SCD 1051) 1997) |
| 3 | Ulf Björlin | Stockholm Philharmonic Orchestra | 1968 | 13:20 | Eklidens skola, Nacka | His Master's Voice | (Note: U. Björlin;EMI (E 063–34405)) |
| 4 | Göran Nilson | Örebro Symphony Orchestra | 1979 | 14:00 | Örebro Concert Hall | Bluebell of Sweden | (Note: G. Nilson–Bluebell (ABCD 003) 1987) |
| 5 | Jan-Olav Wedin | Stockholm Sinfonietta | 1980 | 12:12 | Cirkus | BIS | (Note: J. Wedin–BIS (CD–165) 1988) |
| 6 | Mario Bernardi | CBC Vancouver Orchestra | 1992 | 13:17 | Orpheum | CBC Records | (Note: M. Bernardi–CBC (SMCD5157) 1996) |
| 7 | James DePreist | Malmö Symphony Orchestra | 1992 | 13:12 | Malmö Concert Hall | BIS | (Note: J. DePreist–BIS (CD–570) 1988) |
| 8 | Esa-Pekka Salonen | Swedish Radio Symphony Orchestra | 1993 | 13:24 | Berwald Hall | Sony Classical | (Note: E. Salonen–Sony Classical (SK 64140) 1993) |
| 9 | Anton Nanut | RTV Slovenia Symphony Orchestra | ? | 14:16 | ? | Classical Gallery | (Note: A. Nanut—Classical Gallery (CLG 7105) 1993) |
| 10 | Okko Kamu | Helsingborg Symphony Orchestra | 1994 | 12:28 | Helsingborg Concert Hall | Naxos | (Note: O. Kamu–Naxos (8.553115) 1995) |
| 11 | Ari Rasilainen | Norwegian Radio Orchestra | 1998 | 13:02 | Lindemansalen | Finlandia Records | (Note: Records 1998) |
| 12 | Dorrit Matson | New York Scandia Symphony | 2001 | 13:18 | Trinity Church | Centaur | (Note: D. Matson–Centaur (CRC2607) 2002) |
| 13 | Christopher Warren-Green | Jönköping Sinfonietta | 2002 | 13:30 | Jönköping Concert Hall | Intim Musik | (Note: C. Warren-Green–Intim Musik (IMCD 082) 2003) |
| 14 | Mats Rondin | Norrköping Symphony Orchestra | 2003 | 13:21 | De Geerhallen | Naxos | (Note: M. Rondin–Naxos (8.557426) 2003) |
| 15 | Ola Rudner | Württembergische Philharmonie Reutlingen | 2013 | 13:41 | Probensaal | Bella Musica | (Note: O. Rudner–Bella Musica (BM319288) 2013) |

== Notes, references, and sources ==
=== Sources ===
- "Dagens stunder: Lyrisk Svit" [Moments of the Day: Lyrical Suite]. gehrmans.se. Gehrmans Musikförlag.
- "Pastoralsvit" [Pastoral Suite]. gehrmans.se. Gehrmans Musikförlag.
- Lars-Erik Larsson (2019). Under tonsättarens taktpinne: svenska tonsattare dirigerar egna verk [Under the composer's baton: Swedish composers conduct their own works] (CD booklet). Caprice. OCLC 1104066491. CAP21920.
- Eriksson, Tore (1992). Malmö Symphony Orchestra: Portrait (CD booklet). James DePreist & Malmö Symphony Orchestra. BIS. pp. 4–5. OCLC 29640891. CD–570.
- Jacobsson, Stig (2003). Nordic Classical Favourites (CD booklet). Translated by Thomas, D. Russell. Mats Rondin & Norrköping Symphony Orchestra. Naxos. pp. 4–7. OCLC 871876769. 8.557426.
- Lundin, Peter (2002). Lars-Erik Larsson: God in Disguise / Little Serenade, Op. 12 / Winter's Tale, Op. 18 / Pastoral Suite, Op. 19 (CD booklet). Translated by Schenck, Linda. Christopher Warren-Green & Jönköping Sinfonietta. Intim musik. pp. 2–3. OCLC 53054794. IMCD 082.
- Nyström, Martin (1993). Lars-Erik Larsson: Förklädd Gud (God in Disguise) / Pastoral Suite / Violin Concerto (CD booklet). Esa-Pekka Salonen & Swedish Radio Symphony Orchestra. Sony Classical. pp. 6–7. OCLC 34697048. SK 64140.
- Schlüren, Christoph (2015). Lars-Erik Larsson: Symphony No. 2 / Variations, Op. 50 / Barococo Suite, Op. 64 (CD booklet). Translated by Robinson, J. Bradford. Andrew Manze & Helsingborg Symphony Orchestra. cpo. pp. 14–20. OCLC 965545444. 777 672–2.
- Skans, Per (1989). Lars-Erik Larsson: Förklädd Gud (God in Disguise), Op. 24 / Symphony No. 3 in C minor, Op. 34 (CD booklet). Sten Frykberg & Helsingborg Symphony Orchestra. BIS. pp. 2–4. OCLC 21568279. CD–96.
