= Förklädd Gud =

God in Disguise or Förklädd Gud or Förklädd gud (Swedish; "God in Disguise") may refer to:

- Förklädd Gud, a poem by the Swedish writer Hjalmar Gullberg.
- Förklädd Gud, a choral piece by the Swedish composer Lars-Erik Larsson, using Gullberg's words.
- Förklädd Gud, an improvisational jazz group from Sweden, formed in the early 1970s.
