= Op. 54 =

In music, Op. 54 stands for Opus number 54. Compositions that are assigned this number include:

- Beethoven – Piano Sonata No. 22
- Brahms – Schicksalslied
- Chopin – Scherzo No. 4
- Grieg – Lyric Suite
- Haydn, J. - “Tost” Quartets, Set I, Op. 54
- Larsson – Violin Concerto, for violin and orchestra (1952)
- Martin – Petite symphonie concertante
- Mendelssohn – Variations sérieuses
- Saint-Saëns – Requiem
- Schumann – Piano Concerto
- Scriabin – The Poem of Ecstasy
- Shostakovich – Symphony No. 6
- Sibelius – Swanwhite (Svanevit), theatre score and suite (1908, arranged 1908)
- Strauss – Salome
- Tchaikovsky – Legend
- Vierne – Carillon de Westminster
