= Op. 20 =

In music, Op. 20 stands for Opus number 20. Compositions that are assigned this number include:

- Barber – Excursions
- Bartók – Eight Improvisations on Hungarian Peasant Songs
- Beethoven – Septet
- Britten – Sinfonia da Requiem
- Chausson – Symphony in B-flat
- Chopin – Scherzo No. 1
- Dvořák – Moravian Duets
- Elgar – Serenade for Strings
- Haydn – String Quartets, Op. 20
- Hindemith – Das Nusch-Nuschi
- Knussen – Where the Wild Things Are
- Korngold – Das Wunder der Heliane
- Larsson – Intimate Miniatures (Intima miniatyrer), a suite for string quartet (1938)
- Matthay – Piano Quartet
- Mendelssohn – Octet
- Prokofiev – Scythian Suite
- Rachmaninoff – Spring
- Ries – Cello Sonata No. 2
- Saint-Saëns - Violin Concerto No. 1
- Sarasate – Zigeunerweisen
- Schoenberg – Herzgewächse
- Schumann – Humoreske
- Scriabin – Piano Concerto
- Shostakovich – Symphony No. 3
- Sibelius – Malinconia, duo for cello and piano (1900)
- Strauss – Don Juan
- Tchaikovsky – Swan Lake
- Wirén – Symphony No. 3 (1944)
- Zemlinsky – Symphonische Gesänge
