= God in Disguise =

Lyric suite by Lars-Erik Larsson

- Lyrical suite (Note: The original Swedish is "lyrisk svit".) by Lars-Erik Larsson
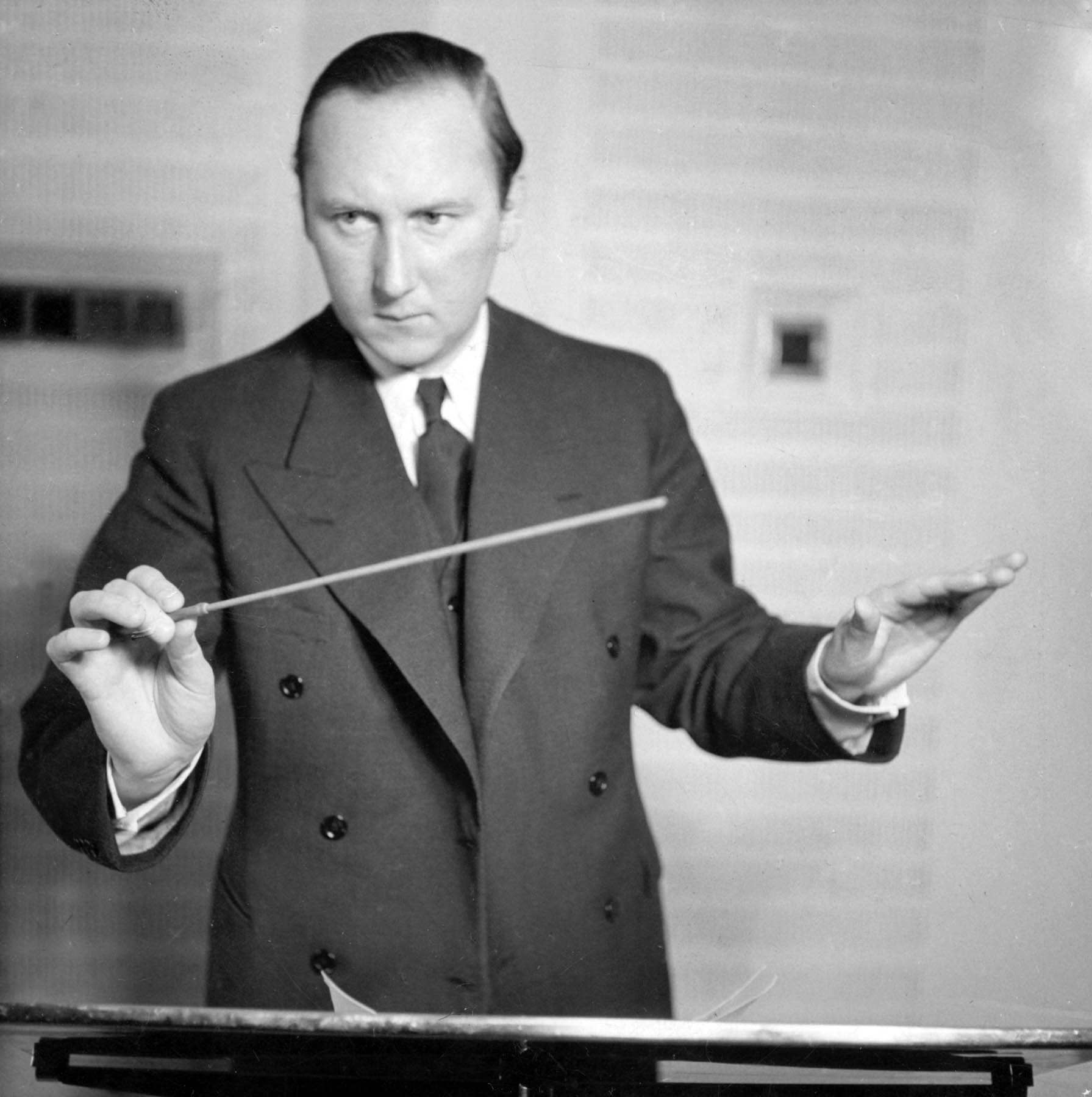
- The composer
- Native name: Förklädd gud
- Opus: 24
- Text: Text by Hjalmar Gullberg
- Language: Swedish
- Composed: 1940
- Publisher: Gehrmans Musikförlag (1946)
- Duration: Approx. 30 minutes

Premiere
- Date: 1 April 1940
- Location: Stockholm, Sweden
- Conductor: Lars-Erik Larsson
- Performers: Radio Entertainment Orchestra

God in Disguise (in Swedish: Förklädd gud; sometimes translated to English as A God Disguised or Disguised God), Op. 24, is a cantata (officially "lyrical suite") for narrator, soprano, baritone, mixed choir, and orchestra written in 1940 by Swedish composer Lars-Erik Larsson. Tuneful and pastoral in style, the neoromantic God in Disguise is a setting of a 1933 narrative poem by the Swedish poet Hjalmar Gullberg; Gullberg's poem is itself based on the prologue to a Hellenic play, in which the god Apollo is exiled from Olympus and condemned to mortal servitude as a flute-playing Thessalian shepherd. The cantata, which premiered over Swedish Radio on 1 April 1940 under the composer's baton, was an instant success. It remains not only one of Larsson's most celebrated compositions, but also one of the most frequently performed pieces of Swedish art music.

== Background ==
Beginning in 1937, the Swedish Broadcasting Corporation—the country's national, publicly-funded radio—employed Larsson as a composer-in-residence, music producer, and conductor; his main task was to write music to accompany various radio programs. One of Larsson's colleagues was the Swedish poet Hjalmar Gullberg, who had joined Swedish Radio the year before and headed its drama division. Together, the two men developed a genre of popular entertainment they called the "lyrical suite", which alternated recited poetry with musical interludes. One such radio program was the Times of Day (Dagens stunder), which included poems by—among others—Verner von Heidenstam and Oscar Levertin; Larsson subsequently excerpted his original music as the Pastoral Suite (Pastoralsvit; Op. 19, 1937–1938).

To build on this success, Gullberg approached Larsson at a Christmas party in 1938 about the possibility of expanding the lyrical suite to include parts for vocal soloists and chorus—that is, to be transform it into a quasi-cantata; he suggested the composer set God in Disguise (Förklädd gud), a narrative poem from his 1933 anthology Love in the Twentieth Century (Kärlek i tjugonde seklet). Gullberg's poem was itself a retelling of the prologue to a Hellenic play by Euripides, while also incorporating elements from the stories of Orpheus and Jesus. In it, Apollo—the Greek god of poetry—has been exiled from Olympus and condemned to live as a mortal for one year. "Wear[ing] no wreath around his golden hair", he settles in Thessaly, "disguised ... among the serving-folk" as a flute-playing "goodly" shepherd who "bears his burden on earth ... without complaint".

Gullberg's poem fired Larsson's imagination. "I instantly became deeply fascinated by the task," the composer recalled, "and together [Gullberg and I] planned the disposition of the different parts for soloists, chorus, and recitant ... It was not until the spring of 1940, however, that I felt the subject had matured sufficiently within me for the composition to begin". By then, the Nazi occupation of Denmark and invasion of Norway during World War II had begun, and Gullberg asked Larsson if he could add to his text a new forward in support of Sweden's threatened Nordic neighbors:

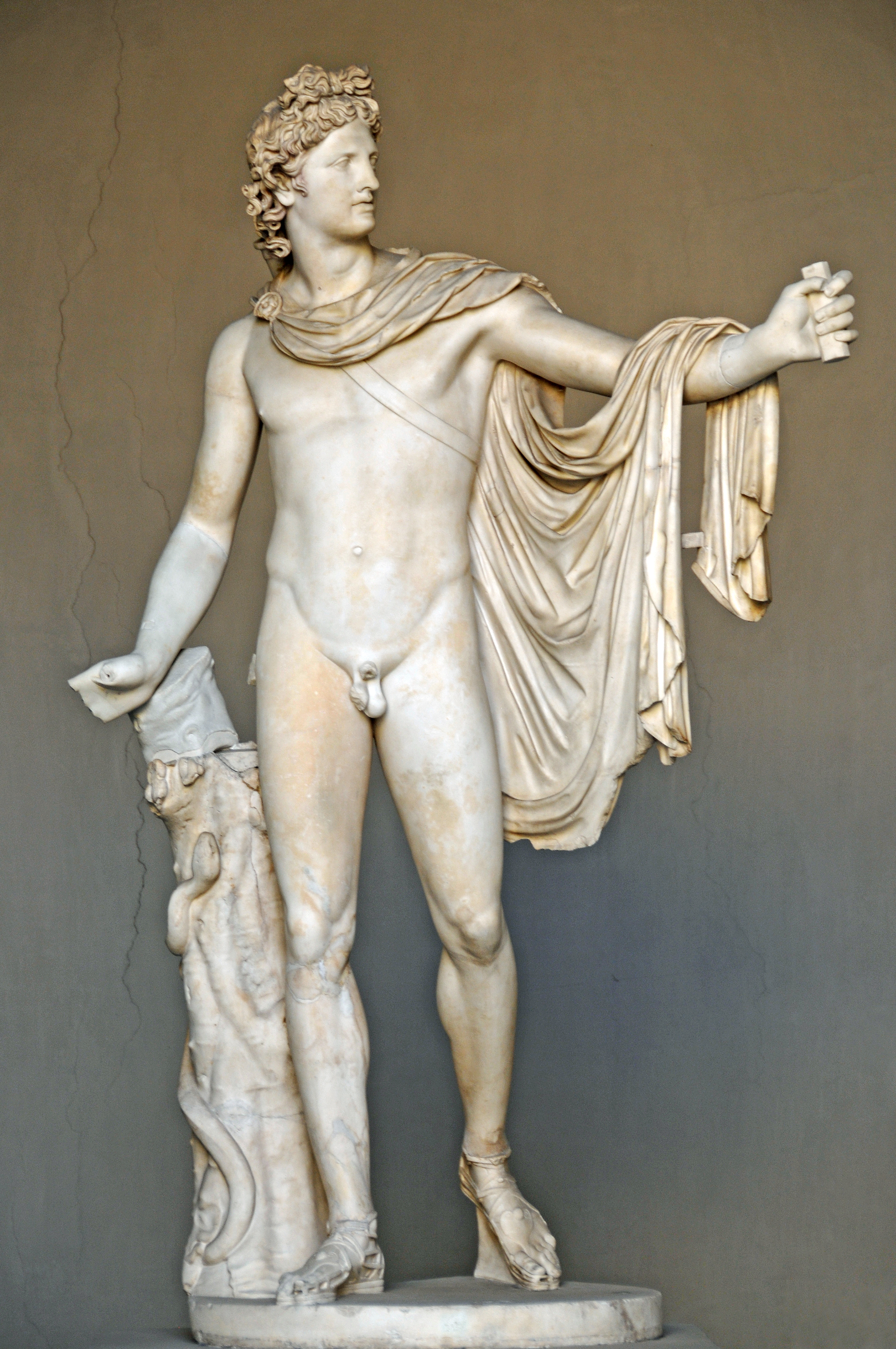
God in Disguise tells a story about Apollo, the Greek god of poetry and music, who in exile wanders earth disguised as a flute-playing "goodly" shepherd in Thessaly.

Swedish original
Ej för de starka i världen men de svaga.

Ej för krigare men bönder som ha plöjt
sin jordlott utan att klaga,
spelar en gud på flöjt.

Det är en grekisk saga ...
English translation (Note: The English translation is by John Hearne (1990).)

Not for the strong in the world but for the feeble.
Not for the warlike, but for the humble
who till the soil without a grumble,
a god plays on a flute.

It is a Grecian fable ...

God in Disguise is thus a "protest against violence" that "inspired in listeners a sense of calm and confidence during dark times and instilled in them the firm hope that truth and right would eventually prevail", or as the seventh poem states:

Swedish original

Än vandrar gudar över denna jord.
En av dem sitter kanske vid ditt bord.
Tro ej att någonsin en gud kan dö.
Han går förbi dig, men din blick är slö.

Han bär ej spira eller purpurskrud.
Blott av hans verkan känner man en gud.
Den regeln har ej blivit överträdd:
är Gud på jorden, vandrar han förklädd.

English translation

So gods are wandering yet upon the earth.
One of them sits, perhaps, beside your hearth.
Think not that any god can ever die.
He walks beside you, but you shield your eye.

He bears no spear, nor wears a purple gown.
But by his deeds a god might be made known.
It is a rule unbroken, be advised:

when gods are on the earth, they go disguised!

The piece premiered over Swedish Radio on 1 April 1940, with Larsson conducting the Radio Entertainment Orchestra and Chorus (Radiotjänsts Underhållningsorkester och Radiokören) in Stockholm; the narrator was Olof Molander, the soprano was Kerstin Torlind, and the baritone was Hugo Hasslo. God in Disguise dates to a transitional period in Larsson's art, in which he began evolving his established neoclassical style with an emerging neoromanticism.

== Structure ==
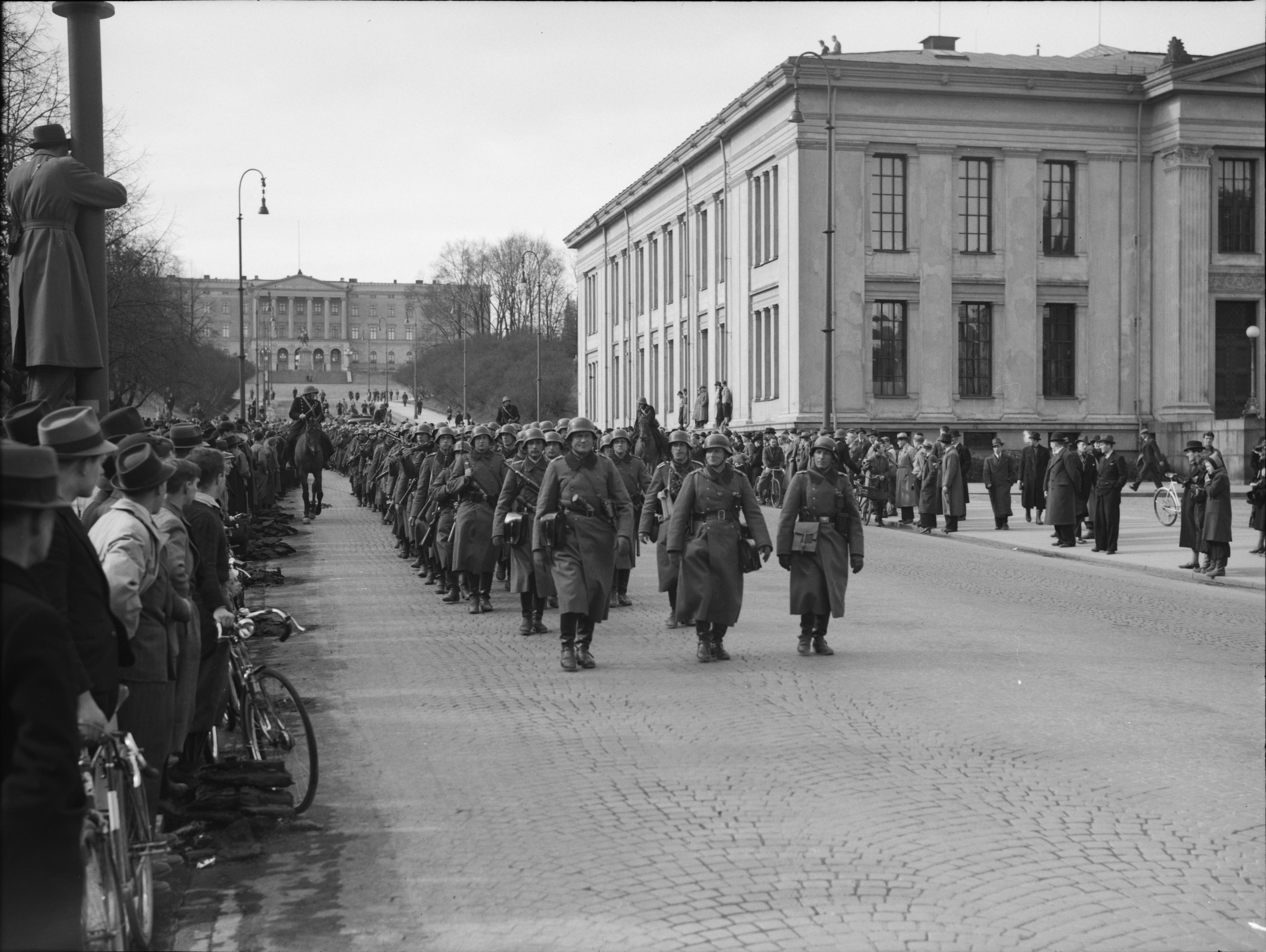
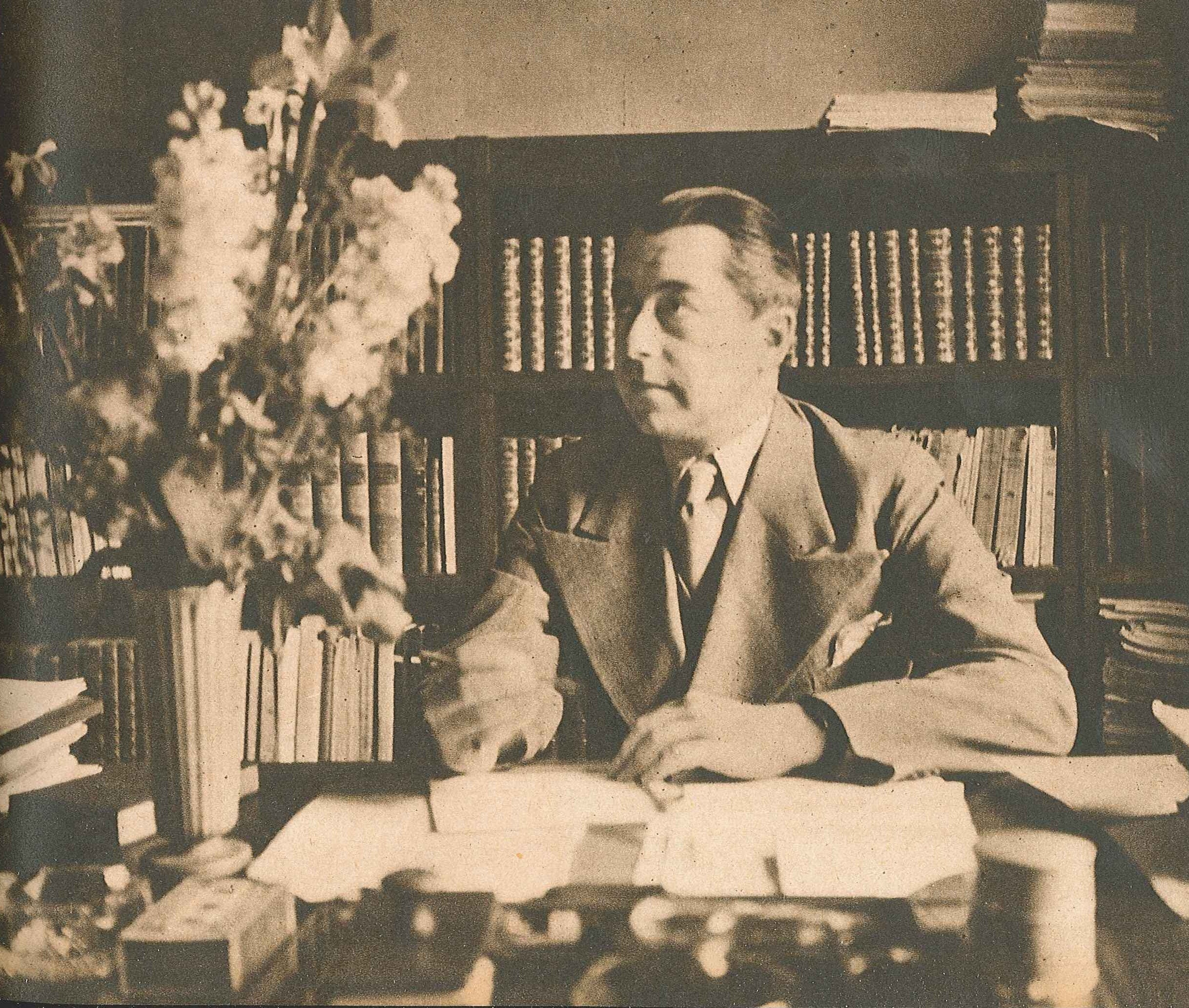
Hjalmar Gullberg (bottom), Larsson's collaborator on God in Disguise, added a forward to his poem in response to the 1940 Nazi invasion of Denmark and Norway (top).

God in Disguise, which lasts about 30 minutes, comprises ten sections:

- Prelude (Förspel): Andante tranquillo [Orchestra]
- Recitation:
  Förword (Forward). Ej för de starka i världen men de svaga ... (Not for the strong in the world but for the feeble ...) (Note: A solo oboe plays the first 12 bars of No. 2 following the fourth and final line of the Forward: Det är en grekisk saga ... (It is a Grecian fable ...). After this solo, the narrator reads Poem I; this, in turn, is followed by the entirety of No. 2.)
  I. Vem spelar på pipa en ... (Who plays upon a pipe ...)
- No. 2: Allegro moderato [Chorus and orchestra]
- Recitation:
  II. Apollon bor i ett tessaliskt stall ... (Apollo stays in a Thessalian steading ...)
  III. Kring höstlig vaktelds bränder ... (Around the fire in autumn ...)
  IV. Välsignelse följer / i gudarnas spår ... (Well-being will follow / the path of a god ...)
- No. 3: Agitato [Baritone, chorus, and orchestra]
- No. 4: Alla marcia [Chorus and orchestra]
- Recitation:
  V. Husbonden må vi prisa säll ... (So let us praise this husbandman ...)
  VI. Vad faller över träden ... (What shimmers in the forest ...)
- No. 5: Andantino quasi allegretto [Soprano, chorus, and orchestra]
- Recitation:
  VII. Än vandrar gudar över denna jord ... (So gods are wandering yet upon the earth ...)
  VIII. Tror du att fåren skulle / beta i morgonglans ... (Think you that sheep would / ever graze in the glowing morn ...)
  IX. Bjuder ett mänskoöga ... (When with a beck'ning glance ...)
- No. 6: Andante—Andante molto tranquillo [Soprano, baritone, chorus, and orchestra]

== Instrumentation ==
God in Disguise is scored for narrator, soprano, baritone, mixed choir (sopranos, altos, tenors, and baritones), and orchestra. The orchestra includes the following instruments:

- Woodwinds: 2 flutes, 2 oboes, 2 clarinets (in B♭), and 2 bassoons
- Brass: 2 horns (in F), 2 trumpets (in C), and trombone
- Percussion: timpani
- Strings: violins, violas, cellos, double basses, and harp

Gehrmans Musikförlag published the cantata in 1946.

== Recordings ==
The sortable table below lists commercially available recordings of God in Disguise:

No.	Conductor	Orchestra	Narrator	Soprano	Baritone	Choir	Rec. (Note: Refers to the year in which the performers recorded the work; this may not be the same as the year in which the recording was first released to the general public.)	Time	Recording venue	Label	Ref.
1	Stig Westerberg (1)	Stockholm Radio Orchestra (1)	Lars Ekborg	Elisabeth Söderström	Erik Saedén	Martin Lidstam Voice Ensemble	1956	31:01	Royal Swedish Academy of Music	Swedish Society Discofil	(Note: S. Westerberg–Swedish Society (SCD 1096) 1998)
2	Stig Westerberg (2)	Swedish Radio Symphony Orchestra (2)	Max Von Sydow	Catarina Ligendza	Ingvar Wixell	Swedish Radio Choir (1)	1973	30:50	Cirkus	His Master's Voice / EMI Classics	(Note: S. Westerberg–HMV/EMI 1974)
3	Sten Frykberg	Helsingborg Symphony Orchestra	Per Jonsson	Birgit Nordin	Håkan Hagegård (1)	Helsingborg Concert Hall Choir	1978	31:23	Helsingborg Concert Hall	BIS	(Note: S. Frykberg–BIS (CD–96) 1989)
4	Esa-Pekka Salonen	Swedish Radio Symphony Orchestra (3)	Erland Josephson	Hillevi Martinpelto (1)	Håkan Hagegård (2)	Swedish Radio Choir (2)	1993	30:00	Berwald Hall	Sony Classical	(Note: E. Salonen–Sony Classical (SK 64140) 1993)
5	Petter Sundkvist	Swedish Chamber Orchestra	Frej Lindqvist	Karin Ingebäck	Anders Larsson	Amadei Chamber Choir	1995	29:08	Örebro Concert Hall	Naxos	(Note: P. Sundkvist–Naxos (8.553738) 1996)
6	Eva Karpe	"Members of the Radio Symphony"	Mark Levengood	Charlotta Larsson	Gunnar Birgersson	"Members of the Radio Symphony"	2000	36:49	Enskede Church	Nosag	(Note: E. Karpe–Nosag (NOSAGCD064) 2010)
7	Christopher Warren-Green	Jönköping Sinfonietta	Sven Wollter	Jeanette Köhn	Thomas Lander	Jönköping Chamber Choir	2002	28:54	Jönköping Concert Hall	Intim Musik (Note: This recording is in English.)	(Note: C. Warren-Green–Intim Musik (IMCD 082) 2003)
8	Gustaf Sjökvist	Royal Stockholm Philharmonic Orchestra	Bjorn Granath	Hillevi Martinpelto (2)	Karl-Magnus Fredriksson	Gustaf Sjökvist Chamber Choir	2008	31:47	State Hall, Stockholm Palace	Kungliga Hovstaterna	(Note: G. Sjökvist–Kungliga Hovstaterna (7320470113356) 2012)

== Notes, references, and sources ==
Notes

Sources

- "Förklädd gud: Lyrisk svit" [A God Disguised: Lyrical Suite]. gehrmans.se. Gehrmans Musikförlag.
- Bergfors, P-G (1996). Lars-Erik Larsson: Förklädd gud (God in Disguise) / Hilding Rosenberg: Den heliga natten (Holy Night) (CD booklet). Translated by Smith, Andrew. Peter Sundkvist & Swedish Chamber Orchestra. Marco Polo. p. 2–3. 8.225123.
- Carlweitz, Staffan (1974). Lars-Erik Larsson / Hjalmar Gullberg: Förklädd Gud / Ture Rangström: Tre Sånger (LP case). Stig Westerberg & Swedish Radio Symphony Orchestra. HMV / EMI. E 061–35149.
- Lundin, Peter (2002). Lars-Erik Larsson: God in Disguise / Little Serenade, Op. 12 / Winter's Tale, Op. 18 / Pastoral Suite, Op. 19 (CD booklet). Translated by Schenck, Linda. Christopher Warren-Green & Jönköping Sinfonietta. Intim musik. p. 2–3. IMCD 082. OCLC 53054794
- Nyström, Martin (1993). Lars-Erik Larsson: Förklädd Gud (God in Disguise) / Pastoral Suite / Violin Concerto (CD booklet). Esa-Pekka Salonen & Swedish Radio Symphony Orchestra. Sony Classical. p. 6–7. SK 64140. OCLC 34697048
- Schlüren, Christoph (2015). Lars-Erik Larsson: Symphony No. 2 / Variations, Op. 50 / Barococo Suite, Op. 64 (CD booklet). Translated by Robinson, J. Bradford. Andrew Manze & Helsingborg Symphony Orchestra. cpo. p. 14–20. 777 672–2. OCLC 965545444
- Skans, Per (1989). Lars-Erik Larsson: Förklädd Gud (God in Disguise), Op. 24 / Symphony No. 3 in C minor, Op. 34 (CD booklet). Sten Frykberg & Helsingborg Symphony Orchestra. BIS. p. 2–4. CD–96. OCLC 21568279
- Tillman, Joakim (2012). Förklädd Gud (A God Disguised) (CD booklet). Gustaf Sjökvist & Royal Stockholm Philharmonic Orchestra. Kungliga Hovstaterna. p. 20–21. 7320470113356.
