= A Winter's Tale (Larsson) =

Suite by Lars-Erik Larsson

- by Lars-Erik Larsson
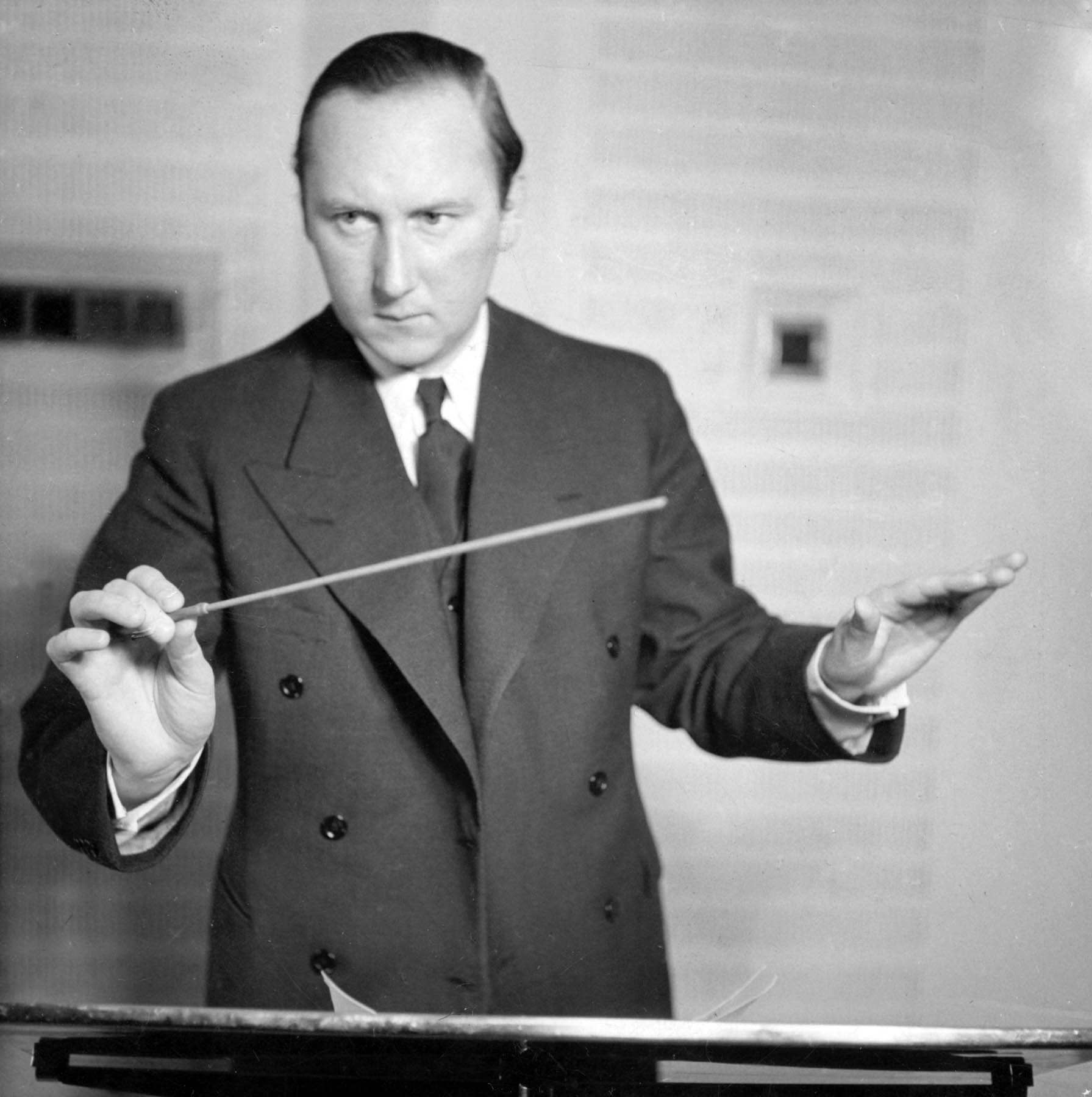
- The composer
- Native name: En vintersaga
- Opus: 18
- Composed: 1938
- Publisher: Gehrmans Musikförlag (1945)
- Duration: Approx. 9 minutes
- Movements: 4

A Winter's Tale (in Swedish: En vintersaga; subtitled: Four Vignettes after Shakespeare (Fyra vinjetter till Shakespeares)), Op. 18, is a four-movement suite for orchestra written from 1937 to 1938 by Swedish composer Lars-Erik Larsson. The Epilogue (No. 4) is often performed and recorded as a stand-alone concert piece.

== Background ==
Beginning in 1937, the Swedish Broadcasting Corporation—the country's national, publicly funded radio—employed Larsson as a composer-in-residence, music producer, and conductor; his main task was to write music to accompany various radio programs. One of Larsson's colleagues was the Swedish poet Hjalmar Gullberg, who had joined Swedish Radio the year before and headed its drama division. Together, the two men developed a genre of popular entertainment they called the "lyrical suite", (Note: The original Swedish is "lyrisk svit".) which alternated recited poetry with musical interludes. Larsson's first commission of this type was to compose four orchestral vignettes to accompany the 1938 radio recitation of a Swedish-language translation Shakespeare's The Winter's Tale; he subsequently published these as A Winter's Tale.

== Structure ==
A Winter's Tale, which lasts about 9 to 10 minutes, is in four movements. They are as follows:

1. Siciliana: Andantino
2. Intermezzo: Allegro leggiero
3. Pastoral: Allegretto pastorale
4. Epilogue (Epilog): Andante

== Instrumentation ==
A Winter's Tale is scored the following instruments:

- Woodwinds: 2 flutes, 2 oboes, 2 clarinets (in B♭), and 2 bassoons
- Brass: 2 horns (in F), 2 trumpets (in C), and trombone
- Percussion: timpani
- Strings: violins, violas, cellos, double basses, and harp

Gehrmans Musikförlag published the suite in 1945.

== Recordings ==
The sortable table below lists commercially available recordings of A Winter's Tale:

No.	Conductor	Orchestra	Rec. (Note: Refers to the year in which the performers recorded the work; this may not be the same as the year in which the recording was first released to the general public.)	Time	Recording venue	Label	Ref.
1	Stig Westerberg	Stockholm Philharmonic Orchestra	1977	10:19	Stockholm Concert Hall	Swedish Society Discofil	(Note: S. Westerberg–Swedish Society (SCD 1051) 1997)
2	Jan-Olav Wedin	Stockholm Sinfonietta	1980	10:24	Cirkus	BIS	(Note: J. Wedin–BIS (CD–165) 1988)
3	Mario Bernardi	CBC Vancouver Orchestra	1992	10:02	Orpheum	CBC Records	(Note: M. Bernardi–CBC (SMCD5157) 1996)
4	Dorrit Matson	New York Scandia Symphony	2001	10:53	Trinity Church	Centaur	(Note: D. Matson–Centaur (CRC2607) 2002)
5	Christopher Warren-Green	Jönköping Sinfonietta	2002	9:51	Jönköping Concert Hall	Intim Musik	(Note: C. Warren-Green–Intim Musik (IMCD 082) 2003)
6	Alexander Hanson	Norrköping Symphony Orchestra	2009	10:51	De Geerhallen	Naxos	(Note: A. Hanson–Naxos (8.572339) 2009)
7	Andrew Manze	Helsingborg Symphony Orchestra	2011	10:19	Helsingborg Concert Hall	cpo	(Note: A. Manze–cpo (777 671–2) 2014)

== Notes, references, and sources ==
Notes

Sources

- "En vintersaga: Fyra vinjetter" [The Winter's Tale: Four vignettes]. gehrmans.se. Gehrmans Musikförlag.
- Lundin, Peter (2002). Lars-Erik Larsson: God in Disguise / Little Serenade, Op. 12 / Winter's Tale, Op. 18 / Pastoral Suite, Op. 19 (CD booklet). Translated by Schenck, Linda. Christopher Warren-Green & Jönköping Sinfonietta. Intim musik. p. 2–3. IMCD 082. OCLC 53054794
- Nyström, Martin (1993). Lars-Erik Larsson: Förklädd Gud (God in Disguise) / Pastoral Suite / Violin Concerto (CD booklet). Esa-Pekka Salonen & Swedish Radio Symphony Orchestra. Sony Classical. p. 6–7. SK 64140. OCLC 34697048
- Schlüren, Christoph (2014). Lars-Erik Larsson: Symphony No. 1 / Music for Orchestra / Lyric Fantasy (CD booklet). Translated by Robinson, J. Bradford. Andrew Manze & Helsingborg Symphony Orchestra. cpo. p. 13–17. 777 671–2. OCLC 880851753
- Skans, Per (1989). Lars-Erik Larsson: Förklädd Gud (God in Disguise), Op. 24 / Symphony No. 3 in C minor, Op. 34 (CD booklet). Sten Frykberg & Helsingborg Symphony Orchestra. BIS. p. 2–4. CD–96. OCLC 21568279
