= Intimate Miniatures =

Lyric suite by Lars-Erik Larsson

- Suite by Lars-Erik Larsson
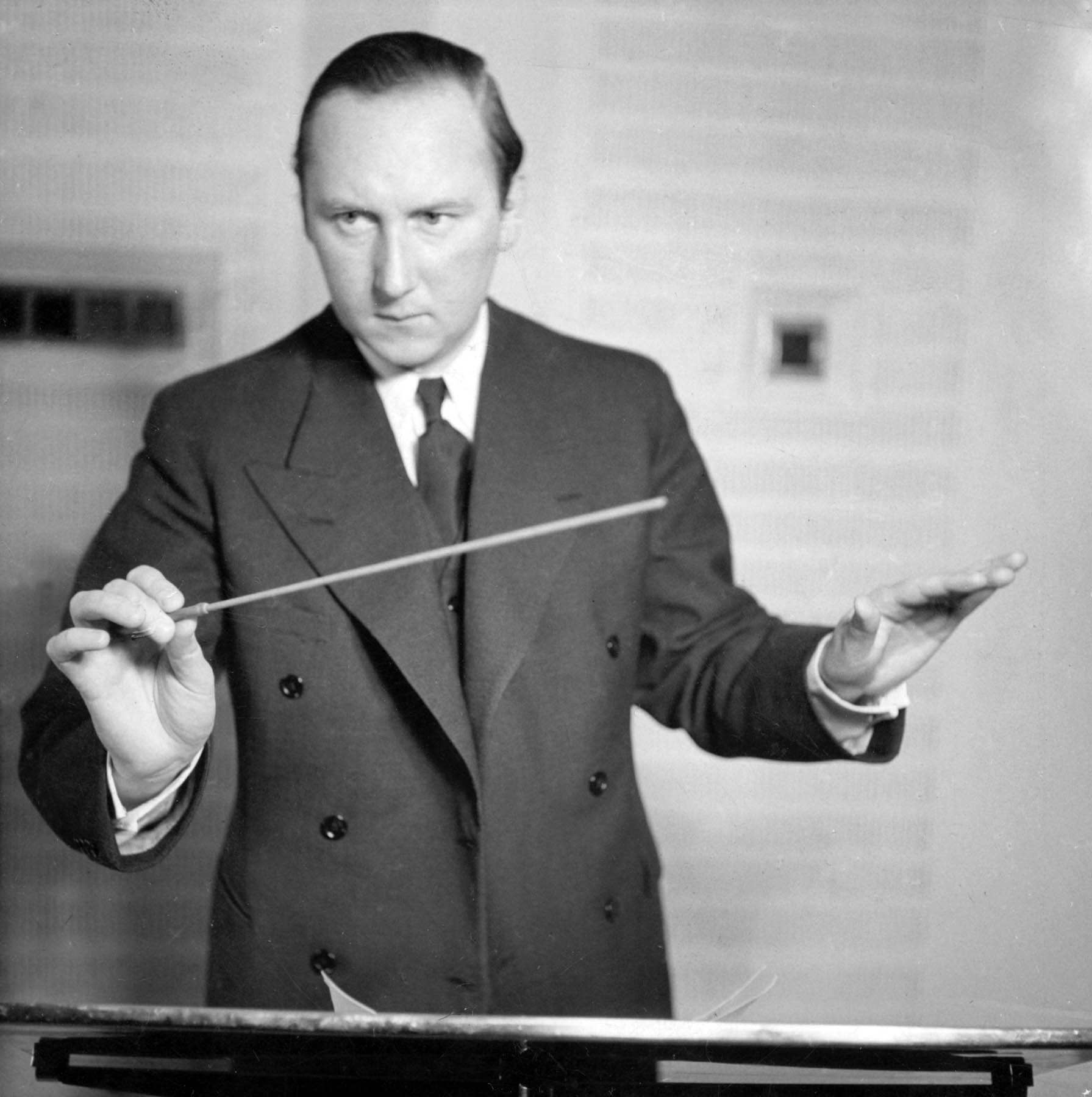
- The composer
- Native name: Intima miniatyrer
- Opus: 20
- Composed: 1938
- Publisher: Gehrmans Musikförlag (1962)
- Duration: Approx. 15 minutes
- Movements: 4

Premiere
- Date: 20 November 1938
- Location: Stockholm, Sweden
- Performers: Stockholm Quartet

Intimate Miniatures (in Swedish: Intima miniatyrer), Op. 20, is a four-movement suite for string quartet written in 1938 by the Swedish composer Lars-Erik Larsson. Originally, the pieces were part of a longer, six-movement "lyrical suite" ("lyrisk svit") called Late Autumn Leaves (Senhöstblad), which Larsson had written to accompany a recitation of poems about fall by the Swedish writer Ola Hansson.

The Stockholm Quartet premiered Late Autumn Leaves on 20 November 1938, with the Swedish actor Ivar Kåge as narrator; the performers were: Ernst Törnqvist and Folke Reinholdson (violins), John Hylbom (viola), and Carl Christiansen (cello).

The Prim Quartet (Primkvartetten) premiered Intimate Miniatures at the Fylkingen venue in Stockholm, Sweden, on 25 October 1940.

== Structure ==
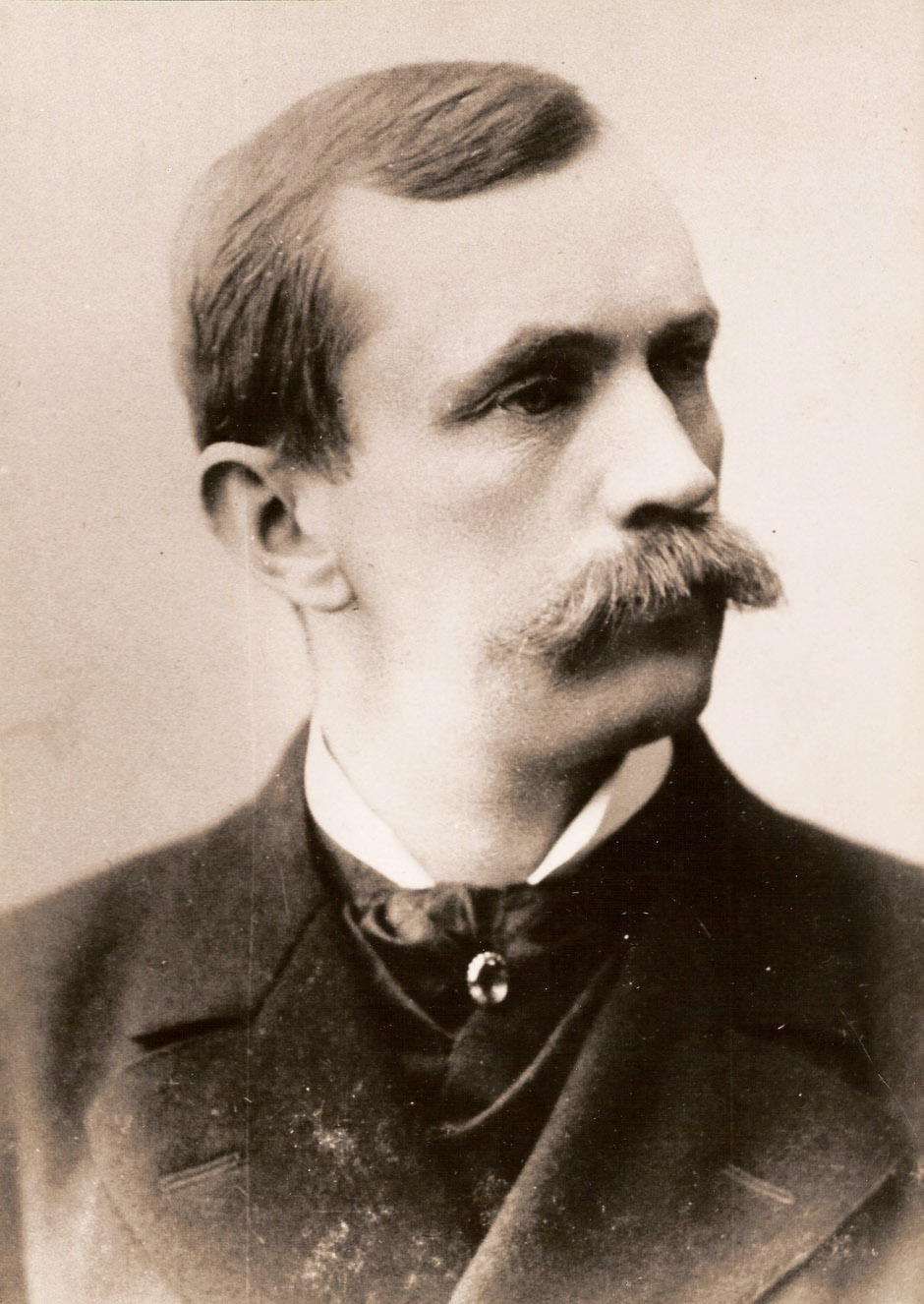
Ola Hansson

The movements of Late Autumn Leaves (Senhöstblad) are as follows; † = Not included in Intimate Miniatures

1. Allegro moderato
2. Allegretto^{†}
3. Andante sostenuto
4. Andantino—Allegro moderato—Andantino^{†}
5. Allegro
6. Adagio

The movements of Intimate Miniatures are as follows:

1. Adagio
2. Allegro moderato
3. Andante sostenuto
4. Allegro

Note that Larsson reordered the movements.

== Recordings ==
The sortable table below lists commercially available recordings of Intimate Miniatures:

Ensemble	First violin	Second violin	Viola	Cello	Rec. (Note: Refers to the year in which the performers recorded the work; this may not be the same as the year in which the recording was first released to the general public.)	Time	Recording venue	Label	Ref.
Helsingborg Quartet	Åsa Rudner	Bengt-Erik Norlén	Bengt Ersson	Göran Lindström	1986	13:00	Rosengård Church	Big Ben Phonogram	(Note: Helsingborg–Big Ben (611 872–003) 1987)
Stenhammar Quartet	Peter Olofsson	Per Öman	Tony Bauer	Mats Olofsson	2008	13:33 (Note: In 2008, the Stenhammar Quartet made the world premiere studio recording of the complete six-movement Late Autumn Leaves (Senhöstblad), which lasts 21:13.)	Swedish Radio Studio 2	Daphne	(Note: Stenhammar–Daphne (DAPHNE 1035) 2008)

== Notes, references, and sources ==
Notes

Sources

- "Intima miniatyrer för stråkkvartett" [Intimate Miniatures for string quartet]. gehrmans.se. Gehrmans Musikförlag.
- "Intima miniatyrer för stråkkvartett" [Intimate Miniatures for string quartet]. swedishmusicalheritage.com. The Royal Swedish Academy of Music. 2022.
- Friedner, Calle (2008). Lars-Erik Larsson: String Quartets (CD booklet). Translated by Tanner, Roger. Stenhammar Quartet. Daphne. p. 4–9. DAPHNE 1035. OCLC 840087298
- Sjöberg, Paul-Christian (1987). Lars-Erik Larsson: String Quartets (CD booklet). Translated by Posselwhite, Eric. Helsingborgs Quartet. Big Ben Phonogram Company. p. 2–4. 611 872–003. OCLC 18259818
