= Saxophone Concerto (Larsson) =

Concerto in three movements by Lars-Erik Larsson

- by Lars-Erik Larsson
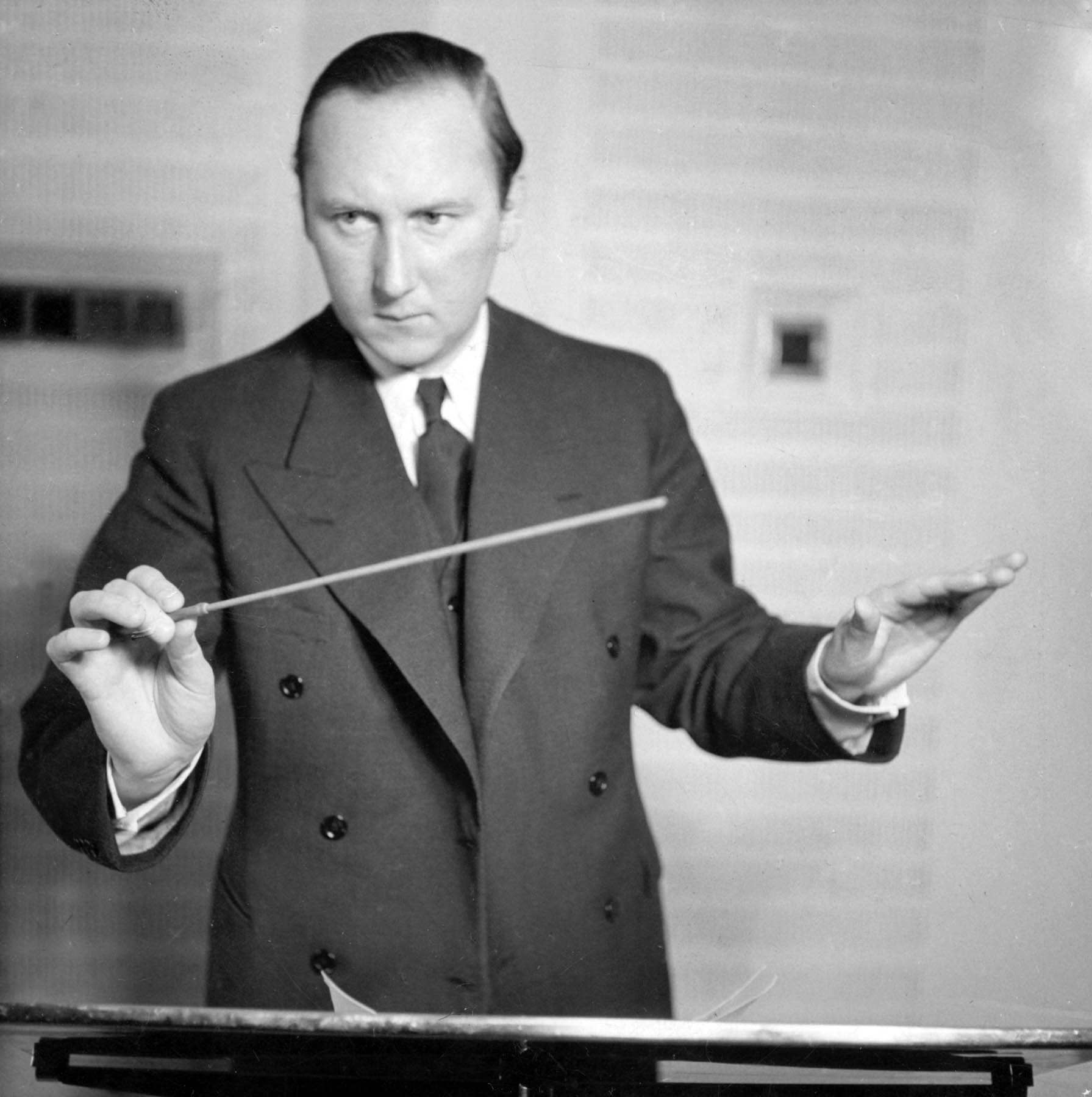
- The composer
- Opus: 14
- Composed: 1934, rev. 1980s
- Publisher: Gehrmans Musikförlag (1952)
- Duration: Approx. 20 minutes
- Movements: 3

Premiere
- Date: 27 November 1934
- Location: Norrköping, Sweden
- Conductor: Tord Benner
- Performers: Norrköping Orchestral Association; Sigurd Raschèr

The Saxophone Concerto, Op. 14, is a three-movement concertante composition for alto saxophone and string orchestra written in 1934 by the Swedish composer Lars-Erik Larsson. The piece premiered on 27 November 1934 in Norrköping, Sweden, with Tord Benner conducting the Norrköping Orchestral Association. The soloist was the German-born American virtuoso Sigurd Raschèr, its dedicatee, whom Larsson had consulted during the compositional process; as such, the concerto incorporated several Raschèr's pioneering techniques—"highly personal tricks and devices". Because the Saxophone Concerto proved too difficult for most soloists (and was therefore oft-neglected), Larsson "simplified" it in the early 1980s to make it more accessible.

== Structure ==
The Saxophone Concerto is in three movements. They are as follows:

1. Allegro molto moderato
2. Adagio
3. Allegro scherzando

== Instrumentation ==
The Saxophone Concerto is scored the following instruments:

- Soloist: Alto saxophone (in E♭)
- Strings: violins, violas, cellos, and double basses

Gehrmans Musikförlag published the piece in 1953.

== Recordings ==
The sortable table below lists commercially available recordings of the Saxophone Concerto:

Conductor	Orchestra	Soloist	Rec. (Note: Refers to the year in which the performers recorded the work; this may not be the same as the year in which the recording was first released to the general public.)	Time	Recording venue	Label	Ref.
Jorma Panula	New Stockholm Chamber Orchestra	Pekka Savijoki	1982	19:19	Concert Hall, Royal Swedish Academy of Music	BIS	(Note: J. Panula–BIS (CD–218) 1984)
Leif Segerstam	Swedish Radio Symphony Orchestra	Christer Johnsson	1983	19:13	Berwald Hall	Caprice	(Note: L. Segerstam–Caprice (CAP 21492) 1995)
Juha Kangas	Ostrobothnian Chamber Orchestra	John-Edward Kelly	1991	20:43	Snellman Hall, Kokkola	Arte Nova	(Note: J. Kelly–Arte Nova (74321 27786 2) 1995)
Yutaka Sado	BBC Philharmonic	Nobuya Sugawa	2007	21:42	Studio 7, New Broadcasting House	Chandos	(Note: Y. Sado–Chandos (CHAN 10466) 2008)

== Notes, references, and sources ==
Notes

Sources

- "Konsert för saxofon och stråkorkester" [Concerto for Saxophone and String Orchestra]. gehrmans.se. Gehrmans Musikförlag.
- Skans, Per (1984). Saxophone Concerti (CD booklet). Jorma Panula & New Stockholm Chamber Orchestra. BIS. p. 4–6. CD–218. OCLC 11863759
- Ogata, Eiko (2008). Nobuya Sugawa plays Honda, Yoshimatsu, Ibert, Larsson (CD booklet). Yutaka Sado & BBC Philharmonic. Chandos. p. 6–7. CHAN 10466. OCLC 227034952
