= Mats Rondin =

Swedish conductor

Mats Rondin (21 September 1960 – 11 October 2014) was a Swedish cellist and conductor.

Rondin studied with Gunnar Norrby at the Royal College of Music in Stockholm and Erling Bengtsson Blöndal and Frans Helmerson at the Swedish Radio Music School in Edsbergsvägen. He gained a diploma in 1981 and studied further with William Pleeth in London. He also took lessons with Ralph Kirshbaum and Mstislav Rostropovich.

Rondin appeared as a soloist with multiple Swedish symphony orchestras, but also with leading orchestras in Denmark, France, Germany, Czechoslovakia, Norway, Iceland, Italy and the Netherlands. He also appeared on numerous occasions on radio and television, including at the live TV concert that inaugurated the new concert hall in Malmö from 1982 to 1985, and was also a principal cellist in the Malmö Symphony Orchestra from 1985 to 1996, as well as the Swedish Radio Symphony Orchestra. From 2005 until his death in 2014, he was professor of cello at the Malmö Academy of Music. He was elected in 2003 as Member of the Royal Academy of Music.

== Discography ==
- 1991: Contemporary European cello music
- 1986: Martinû, Bartók, de Frumerie
- 1994: Vocalise
- 1994: Chamber music for violin, cello and piano - Leoš Janáček
- 2009: Isidor - Mats Rondin plays the music of Lars Danielsson and Cennet Jönsson
