= Violin Concerto (Larsson) =

Concerto in three movements by Lars-Erik Larsson

- by Lars-Erik Larsson
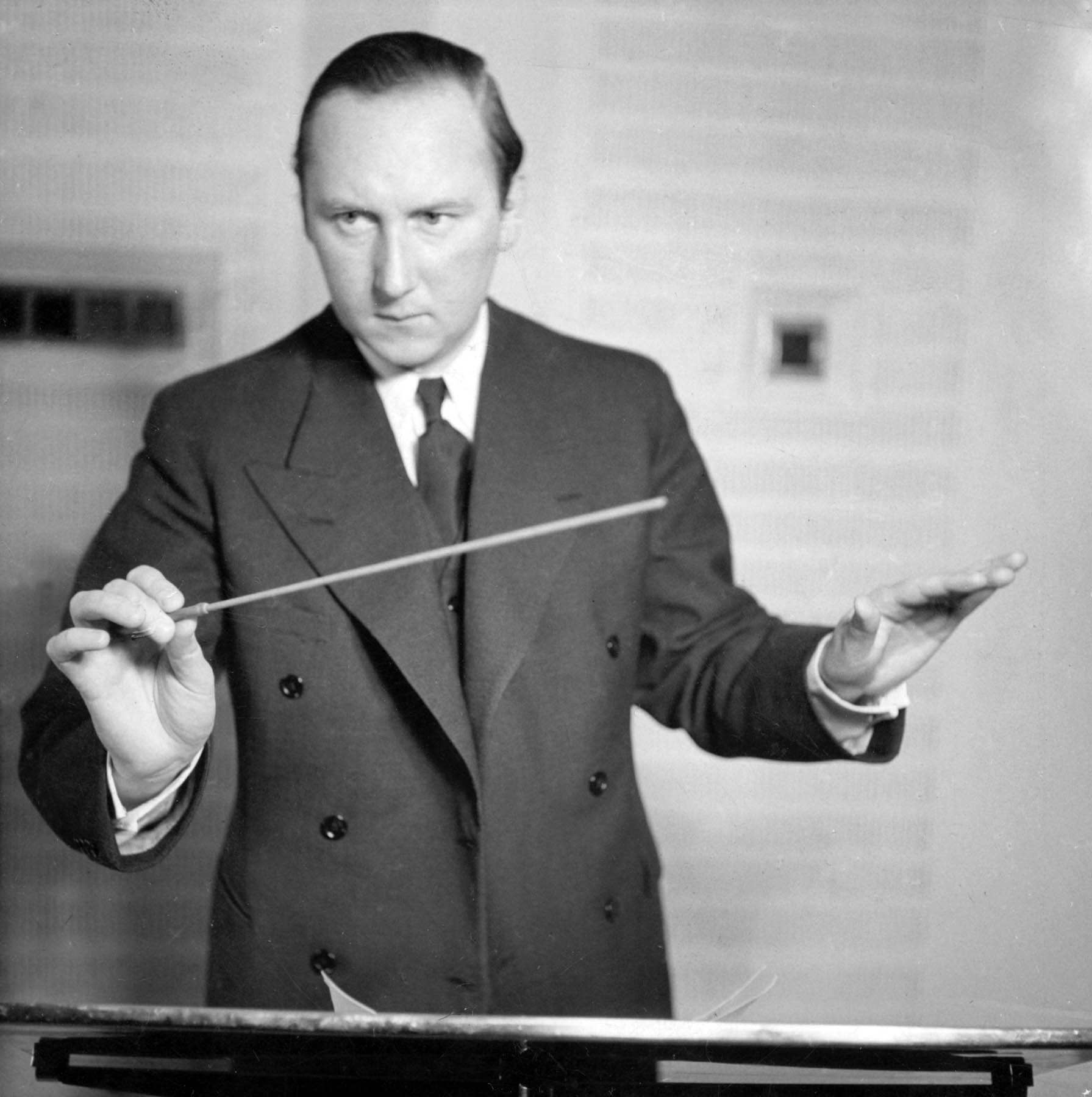
- The composer
- Opus: 54
- Composed: 1952
- Publisher: Gehrmans Musikförlag (1956)
- Duration: Approx. 25 minutes
- Movements: 3

Premiere
- Date: 11 January 1953
- Location: Swedish Radio
- Conductor: Sten Frykberg
- Performers: Swedish Radio Orchestra; André Gertler

The Violin Concerto, Op. 54, is a three-movement concertante composition for violin and orchestra written in 1952 by the Swedish composer Lars-Erik Larsson. The piece premiered over Swedish Radio on 11 January 1953 in Stockholm, Sweden, with Sten Frykberg conducting the Swedish Radio Orchestra. The soloist was the Hungarian violinist André Gertler, its dedicatee.

In 1976, Larsson wrote a new cadenza to movement I.

== Structure ==
The Violin Concerto is in three movements. They are as follows:

1. Moderato
2. Andante pastorale
3. Lento—Allegro molto (Note: Although the publisher, Gehrmans Musikförlag, lists the third movement of the Violin Concerto as "Allegro molto", the manuscript that the publisher provides on its website shows that the movement begins as "Lento" (p. 76 of the score) and later transitions into "Allegro molto" (p. 80). The Royal Swedish Academy of Music correctly lists the movement as "Lento—Allegro molto".)

== Instrumentation ==
The Violin Concerto is scored the following instruments:

- Soloist: violin
- Woodwinds: 2 flutes, 2 oboes, 2 clarinets (in A; later in B♭), and 2 bassoons
- Brass: 4 horns (in F), 2 trumpets (in C), 3 trombones, and tuba
- Percussion: timpani
- Strings: violins, violas, cellos, and double basses

Gehrmans Musikförlag published the piece in 1956.

== Recordings ==
The sortable table below lists commercially available recordings of the Violin Concerto:

Conductor	Orchestra	Soloist	Rec. (Note: Refers to the year in which the performers recorded the work; this may not be the same as the year in which the recording was first released to the general public.)	Time	Recording venue	Label	Ref.
Sten Frykberg (1)	Swedish Radio Orchestra (1)	André Gertler	195?	?	?	London International	(Note: S. Frykberg–London International (TW 91091) 1955)
Sten Frykberg (2)	Swedish Radio Orchestra (2)	Louis Kaufman	1955	24:35	?	Music & Arts	(Note: S. Frykberg–Music & Arts (MACD–4667) 1991)
Stig Westerberg	Stockholm Philharmonic Orchestra	Leo Berlin	1976	25:54	Stockholm Concert Hall	Swedish Society Discofil	(Note: S. Westerberg–Swedish Society (SCD 1004) 1986)
Esa-Pekka Salonen	Swedish Radio Symphony Orchestra (3)	Arve Tellefsen	1993	26:50	Berwald Hall	Sony Classical	(Note: E. Salonen–Sony Classical (SK 64140) 1993)

== Notes, references, and sources ==
Notes

Sources

- "Violinkonsert" [Violin Concerto]. gehrmans.se. Gehrmans Musikförlag.
- "Violin concerto". swedishmusicalheritage.com. The Royal Swedish Academy of Music. 2022.
- Hedman, Frank (1986). Lars-Erik Larsson: Violin Concerto / A Winter's Tale / Violin Concertino (CD booklet). Stig Westerberg & Stockholm Philharmonic Orchestra. Swedish Society Discofil Classical. p. 2–3. SCD 1004. OCLC 17797595
- Nyström, Martin (1993). Lars-Erik Larsson: Förklädd Gud (God in Disguise) / Pastoral Suite / Violin Concerto (CD booklet). Esa-Pekka Salonen & Swedish Radio Symphony Orchestra. Sony Classical. p. 6–7. SK 64140. OCLC 34697048
- Schlüren, Christoph (2014). Lars-Erik Larsson: Symphony No. 1 / Music for Orchestra / Lyric Fantasy (CD booklet). Translated by Robinson, J. Bradford. Andrew Manze & Helsingborg Symphony Orchestra. cpo. p. 13–17. 777 671–2. OCLC 880851753
