= Erik Blomberg (writer) =

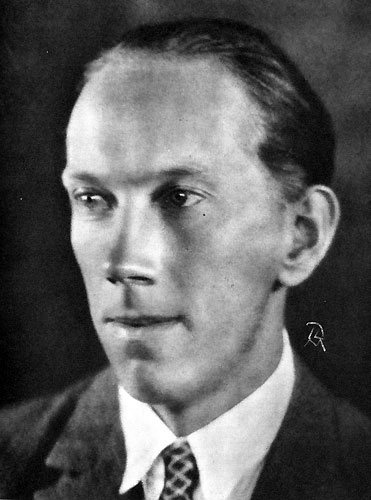
Blomberg c. 1935.

Erik Axel Blomberg (17 August 1894 – 8 April 1965) was a Swedish poet, translator and critic.

== Biography ==
Blomberg was born into a bourgeois family in Stockholm. After graduating from gymnasium in 1912, he went to study at Uppsala University, where he earned a Licentiate's degree in art history in 1919. Afterwards, he worked as an art critic for the newspapers Stockholms-Tidningen 1920–26, Stockholms Dagblad 1926–27 and as a literary critic for Social-Demokraten 1930–39. As a translator, Blomberg interpreted poetry from French, English, German and Chinese into Swedish. He was awarded the Swedish Academy's Translation Prize in 1960.

Politically, Blomberg was influenced by marxism. According to him, one of the central tasks of the writer was to depict the realities of working people and the social and political contradictions in society. As a literary critic, Blomberg praised writers of the proletarian school, such as Jan Fridegård, Ivar Lo-Johansson and Vilhelm Moberg. At the same time, he was critical of literary modernism. His poem Gravskrift ('Epitaph') was written after the Ådalen shootings in 1931, when five people were killed after the military opened fire against a demonstration of striking workers. The poem is engraved in the tombstone of the five victims, and went on to become one of the most famous Swedish political poems.

Blomberg died in Stockholm and is buried at Skogskyrkogården.
