= Kerstin Hed =

Swedish poet (1890-1961)

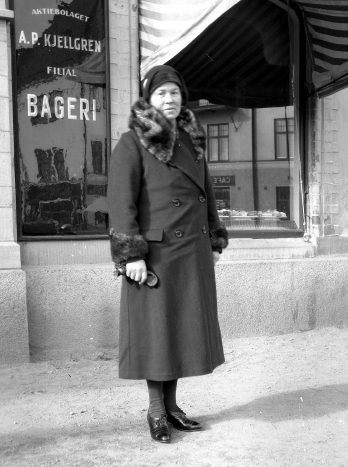
- Kerstin Hed in 1930
- Born: Hilda Gunilla Olsson; 21 May 1890; Hamre, Sweden
- Died: 15 August 1961 (aged 71); Hedemora, Sweden
- Occupation: Poet
- Spouse: Halvare Anders Olsson
- Parents: Kers Fredrik Jansson; Johanna Jansson

Hilda Gunilla Olsson (21 May 1890 – 15 August 1961), known by her pen name Kerstin Hed, was a Swedish poet. Her writing career was productive, during which she published numerous poetry collections. She was awarded the Swedish royal medal Illis quorum, for her significant contributions in the field of poetry.

== Early life and marriage ==
Hilda Olsson was born on 21 May 1890 in Hamre, Sweden. She was the daughter of agricultural workers Kers Fredrik Jansson and Johanna Jansson (née Ersdotter). Olsson attended a public school before taking a summer course at the Tärna highschool. She married Anders Olsson in 1916, and she purchased her family farm Kersgården, in Hamreänger. In 1946, the couple and their two children moved to Matsbo, in northern Hedemora. which was also situated near Hedemora.

== Writing career ==
Olsson adopted the pseudonym Kerstin Hed, taken from the initial syllables of Kersgården and Hedemora. In 1913, her first work under "Kerstin Hed" was a poetry collection Från stigarna published by Ljus. This was shortly followed by her second work "Höstens sång", a poem that was published in Idun magazine. In 1916, Thule publishers released her poetry collection Gammelgården, and the following year, Albert Bonnier publishers issued her work Vägar och vandrare. Before the start of World War II, she released several works, including Arv (1923), Jord och människor (1928), Strömmar mot havet (1931), Bergslag (1934), Vägen till hemlanden (1937), and Av Jafets stam (1939). Her writings of this period were heavily influenced by the landscape of Dalarna County.

Olsson's later writings explored darker themes. In 1942, J.A. Lindblad Bokförlag published her collection entitled Jordens skönhet . Several poetry collections were released in the next few years: Över sjunkna land (1945), Träblåsare (1948), Ord från de stumma (1952), Vandrare i strandskog (1953), Skådebana (1956), Kopparslanten i källan (1959), and Tre orgelpipor (1960). She was honoured with the Swedish royal medal Illis quorum for her significant contributions to the field of poetry.

Although, Olsson is best known as a poet, she published a variety of other works in the 1950s. This included fiction in the form of the anthology of short stories Kvinnor vid älven (1955). She also published Glimtar över Sotdalarna, a historical book in 1958. In addition, she contributed to local newspapers and journals.

== Later years ==
Olsson died in Hedemora, on 15 August 1961.
