= Hjalmar Gullberg =

Swedish poet and translator

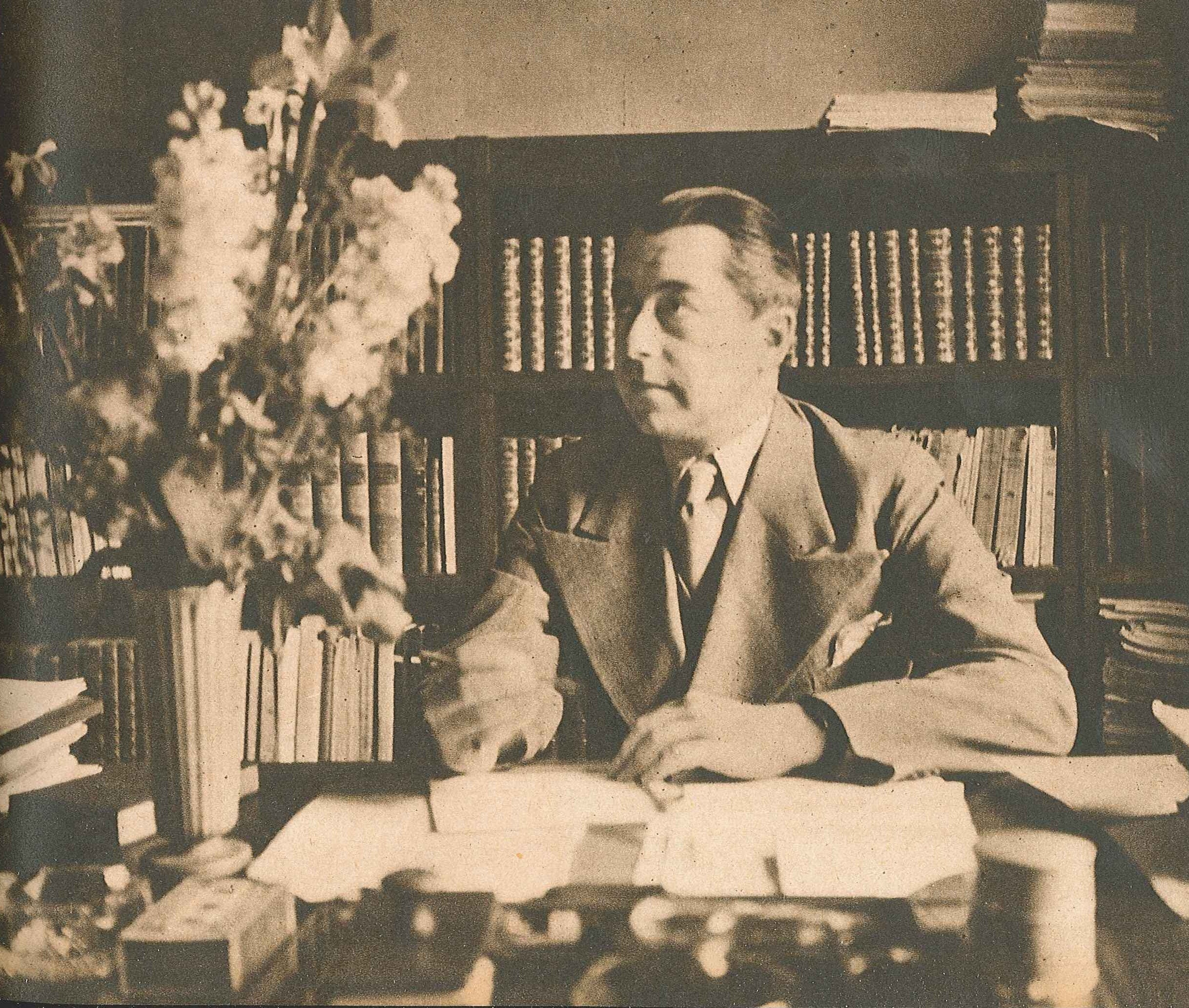
- Hjalmar Gullberg at his writing desk in the early 1940s.
- Born: 30 May 1898; Malmö, Sweden
- Died: 19 July 1961 (aged 63); Holmeja, Sweden
- Occupation: writer

Hjalmar Gullberg (30 May 1898 – 19 July 1961) was a Swedish poet and translator.

== Career ==
Gullberg was born in Malmö, Scania. As a student at Lund University, he was the editor of the student magazine Lundagård. He was the manager of the Swedish Radio Theatre 1936-1950. In 1940 he was made a member of the Swedish Academy, and he also became an honorary doctor of philosophy at Lund University (1944).

Gullberg published a number of poems and prose texts in Lundagård and debuted with a book of poems in the 1920s. His breakthrough was Andliga övningar (1932, "Spiritual exercises") characterized by christian themes, followed by Kärlek i tjugonde seklet (1933, "Love in the twentieth century") that contrasted sensual erotic themes with mysticism. In Fem kornbröd och två fiskar (1942, "Five barley breads and two fishes") he dealt with the contemporary political situation during the Second world war combined with more personal themes. This book marked the end of the first phase in Gullberg's poetry noted for a virtouso use of traditional rhymed verse forms and a distinctively personal lyrical diction.

Gullberg's later work includes Terziner i okonstens tid (1958, "Terza rimas in the unartistic time"), in which he used the verse form borrowed from Dante Alghieri, and Ögon, läppar (1959, "Eyes, lips") that with serene simplicity features love poems and nature poems.

A poem from Gullberg's book Kärlek i tjugonde seklet from 1933, called "Förklädd gud" ("God in disguise"), was set to music by the composer Lars-Erik Larsson in 1940. The resulting lyrical suite has become one of the most well-recognised and best loved pieces of Swedish music for choir and orchestra.

Gullberg was also a translator of Ancient literature and modern literature. He translated works by Aristophanes, Euripides, Sophocles and Federico García Lorca, and introduced in Swedish the contemporary poets Gabriela Mistral, Juan Ramón Jiménez and Giorgos Seferis that were all subsequently awarded the Nobel Prize in Literature.

== Personal life ==
Gullberg had been suffering from myasthenia gravis, which resulted during his last few years that he was bound to his bed. He had also been tracheotomized, and was for long periods of time connected to a ventilator. He committed suicide on 19 July 1961 by drowning at Lake Yddingen in Scania.

== Bibliography ==
- I en främmande stad (1927)
- Sonat (1929)
- Andliga övningar (1932)
- Kärlek i tjugonde seklet (1933)
- Ensamstående bildad herre. Tragicomic verse. (1935)
- Att övervinna världen (1937)
- 100 dikter; a selection from six volumes of verse (1939)
- Röster från Skansen (1941)
- Fem kornbröd och två fiskar (1942; includes Död amazon)
- Hymn till ett evakuerat Nationalmuseum (1942)
- Den heliga natten (1951)
- Dödsmask och lustgård (1952)
- Terziner i okonstens tid (1958)
- Ögon, läppar (1959)
- 50 dikter; a selection from three volumes of verse with an introduction by Carl Fehrman (1961)
- Gentleman, Single, Refined and selected poems, 1937 - 1959 by Hjalmar Gullberg and Judith Moffett. Louisiana State University Press, 1979.
- En anständig och ömklig comoedia. A play in three acts by Hjalmar Gullberg and Olle Holmberg (published 1984)
- Kärleksdikter (first edition with this title published 1967)
- Dikter. With an epilogue by Anders Palm (1985)

== Selected translations and interpretations of other writers' work ==
- Aristophanes: Fåglarna (The Birds) (1928)
- Euripides: Hippolytos (Hippolytus) (1930)
- Euripides: Medea (1931)
- Aristophanes: Lysistrate (Lysistrata) (1932)
- Eurypides: Alkestis (Alcestis) (1933)
- Sophocles: Antigone (1935)
- Molière: Den girige (L'Avare/The Miser) (1935)
- Calderón: Spökdamen (La Dama Duende/The Phantom Lady) (1936)
- Alfred de Musset: Lek ej med kärleken (On ne badine pas avec l'amour) (1936)
- Gabriela Mistral: Dikter (1945)
- Federico García Lorca: Blodsbröllop (Bodas de sangre) (1946)
- Gabriela Mistral: Den heliga vägen (1949)
- Molière: Den inbillade sjuke (Le Malade imaginaire/The Hypochondriac) (translated for Sveriges Radio 1954)
- Gåsmors sagor (1955)
- Själens dunkla natt and other interpretations of foreign lyrics (1956)
- Aeschylus: Agamemnon (1960)
- Franskt 1600-tal (published posthumously in 1962 with an introduction by Olle Holmberg)
- William Shakespeare: Köpmannen i Venedig (The Merchant of Venice) (1964)
- William Shakespeare: Som ni behagar (As You Like It) (1964)

Cultural offices
Preceded by Selma Lagerlöf	Swedish Academy, Seat No.7; 1940–61	Succeeded by Karl Ragnar Gierow
