= Jönköping Concert Hall =

Coordinates: 57.7886°N 14.2292°E

- Jönköpings konserthus
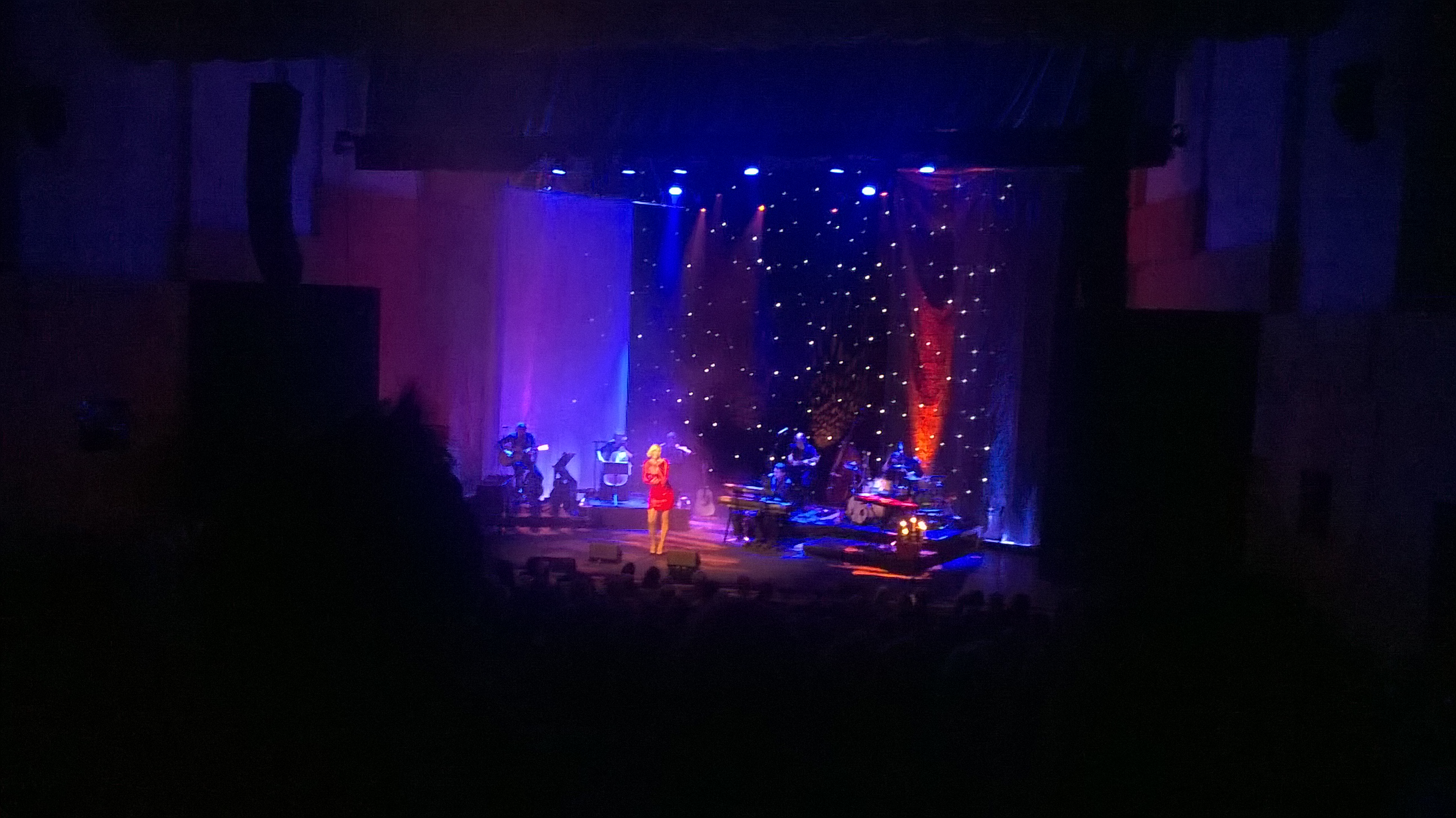
- Sanna Nielsen Christmas concert inside the Jönköping Concert Hall, 4 December 2014
- Interactive map of the Jönköping Concert Hall area

General information
- Location: Jönköping, Sweden
- Construction started: September 1990

The Jönköping Concert Hall (Swedish: Jönköpings konserthus) is a concert hall in Jönköping, Sweden. It was opened in September 1990.

There are two halls, the Hammaskjöld Hall (Swedish: Hammaskjöldsalen) and the Rydberg Hall (Swedish: Rydbergssalen).
