= Oscar Levertin =

Swedish poet, critic and literary historian

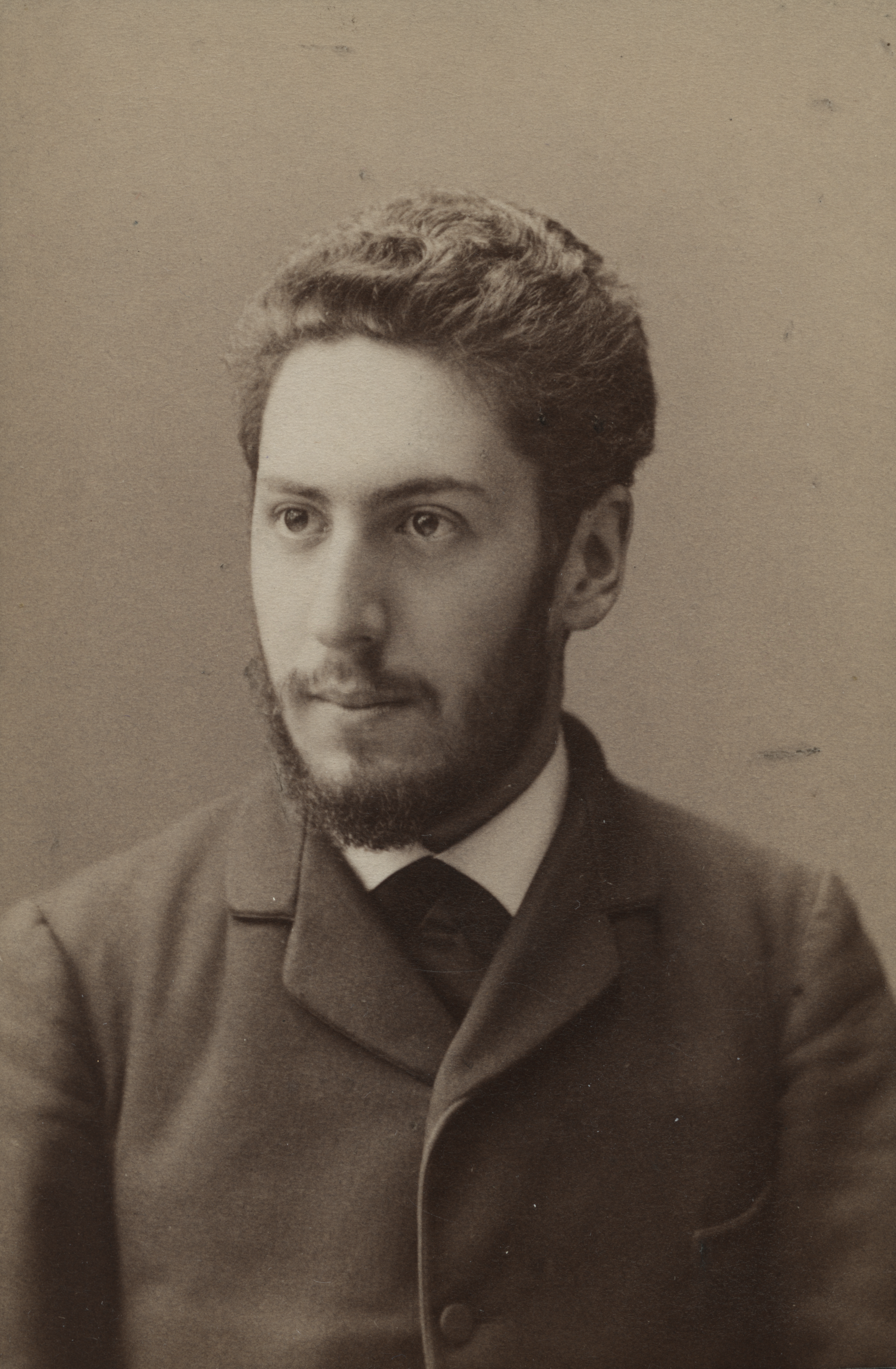
Oscar Levertin.

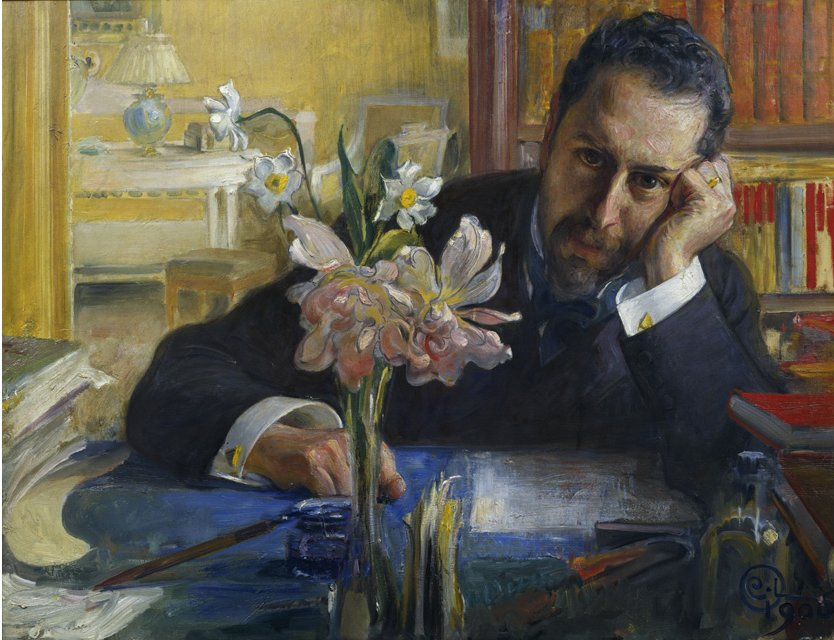
Oscar Levertin painted by Carl Larsson 1906

Oscar Ivar Levertin (17 July 1862, Norrköping – 22 September 1906) was a Swedish poet, critic and literary historian. Levertin was a dominant voice of the Swedish cultural scene from 1897, when he started writing influential high-profile essays and reviews in the daily paper Svenska Dagbladet.

From 1899 until his early death in 1906 he also occupied the first chair of literary history at the Stockholm University, in which role he published extensive studies, particularly in Swedish 18th century literature.

== Overview ==
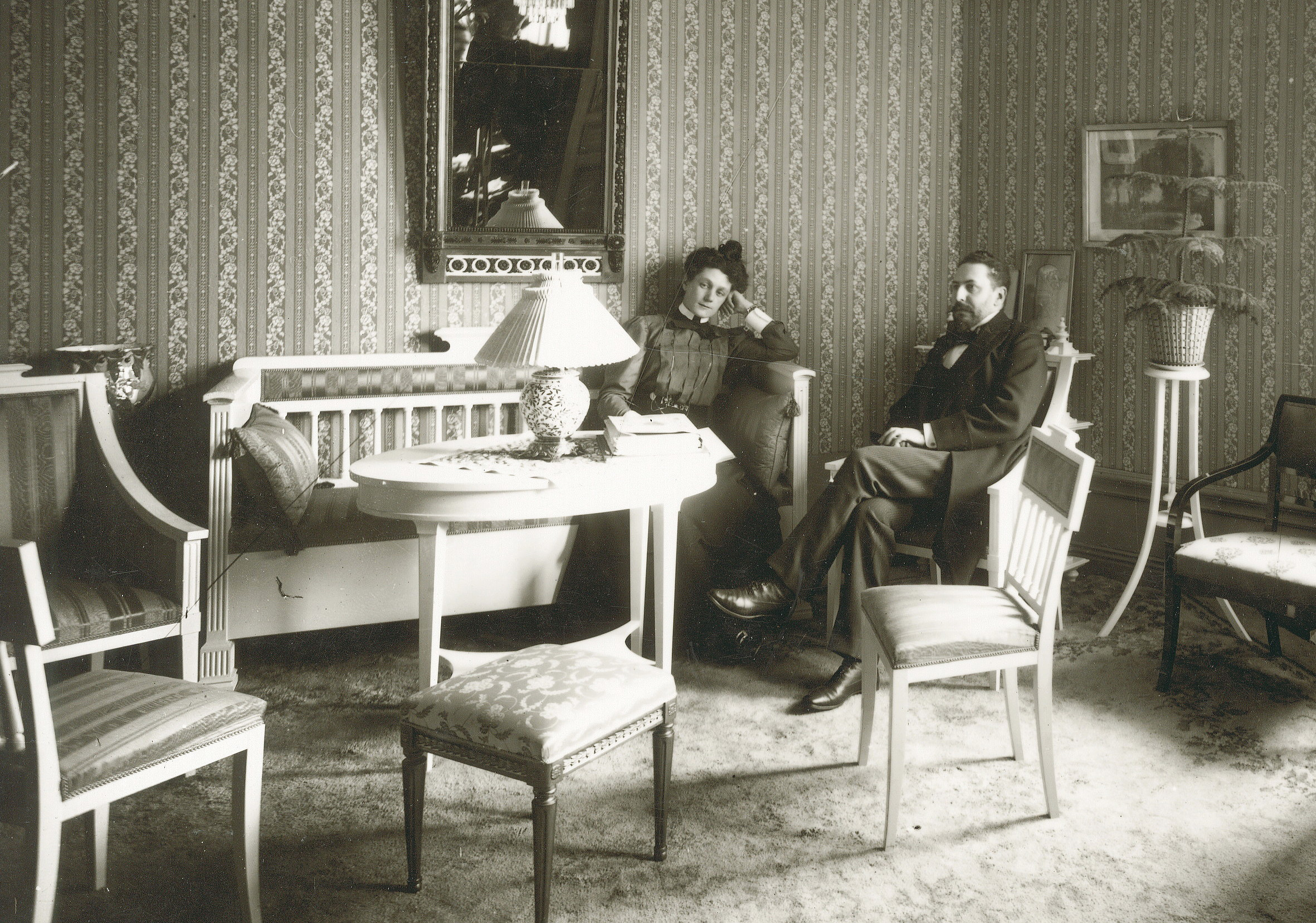
Levertin and his wife Ebba Redlich in their home at no. 2, Karlaplan, Stockholm c.1900

In his own short story collections in the 1880s, Levertin first aligned himself with the Naturalist school of fiction of which August Strindberg was the most prominent member. In 1888, however, the previously unheard Swedish romantic poetic voice of Verner von Heidenstam's Vallfart och vandringsår changed Levertin's stylistic ideals. Levertin and Heidenstam published together a pamphlet attacking the Naturalist style in 1890, and even though Levertin was never to abandon his scientific and materialist view of history (something that sets him off from other poets of his generation), his literary energies were thenceforth channelled into poetry of a romantic, exotic and historical character. Together with Heidenstam's work, Levertin's first collection of poetry, Legender och visor (Legends and Songs) (1891), sparked an 1890s Swedish fashion for historical, particularly "medieval", literature. Unlike Heidenstam's and much other Swedish poetry of the 1890s, Legender och visor is free from Swedish nationalism, drawing on many European as well as Middle Eastern sources. This volume remains highly regarded today, though no longer widely read. Poems from it, including the ballad "Flores och Blanzeflor", remained set texts in Swedish schools into the 1970s.

== In culture ==
Levertin is depicted as Olof Levini in Hjalmar Söderberg's 1912 novel Den Allvarsamma Leken (The Serious Game).

== Bibliography ==
- Från Rivieran: skisser från Medelhavskusten (1883)
- Småmynt (1883)
- Konflikter: nya noveller (1885)
- Pepitas bröllop (with Verner von Heidenstam) (1890)
- Legender och visor (1891)
- Diktare och drömmare (1898)
- Rococo-noveller (1899)
- Magistrarne i Österås (1900)
- Svenska gestalter (1903)
- Kung Salomo och Morolf (1905)

== See also ==
- Flores and Blancheflour
