= Lars-Erik Larsson =

Swedish composer

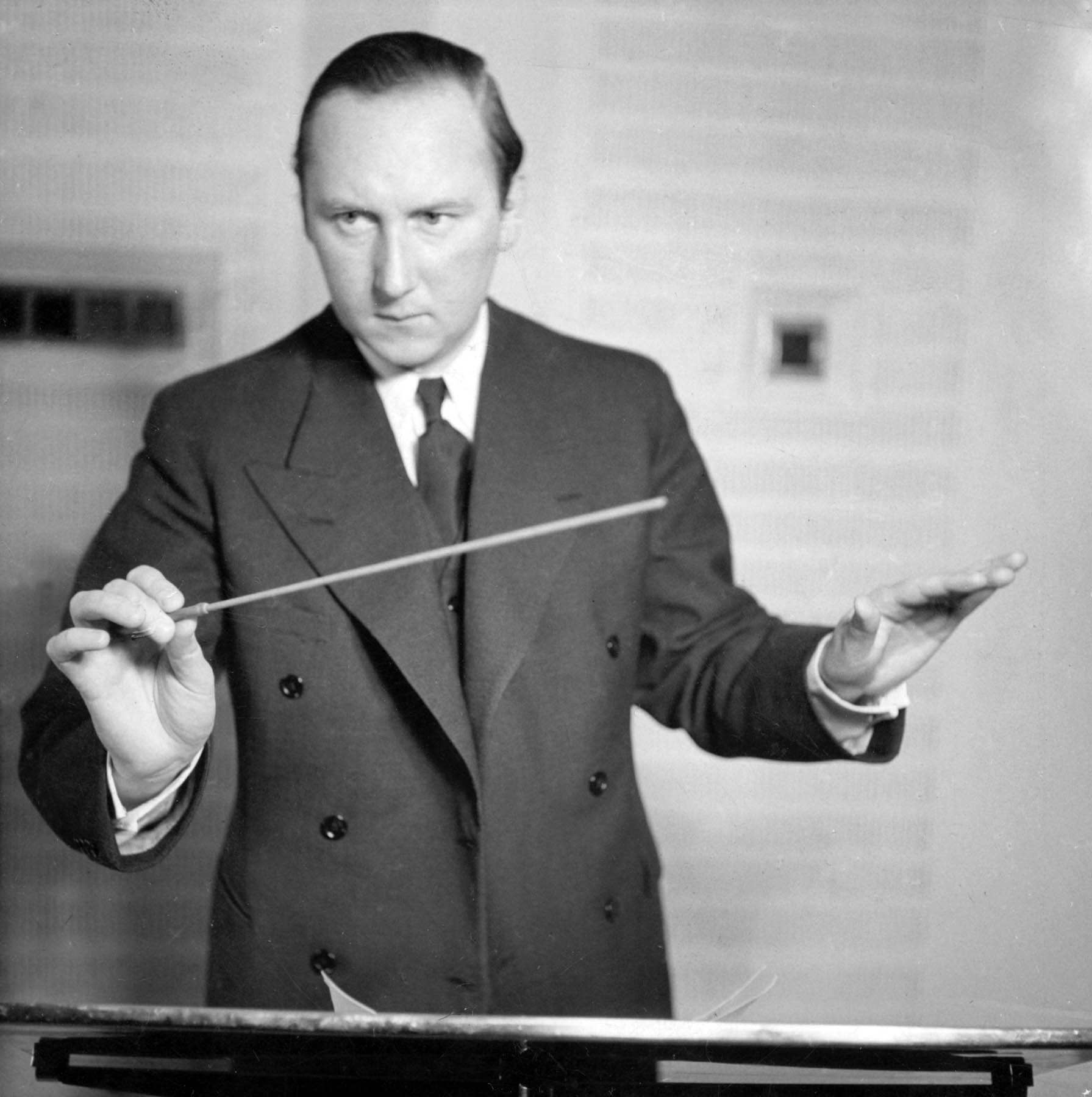
Larsson

Lars-Erik Vilner Larsson (15 May 1908 – 27 December 1986) was a Swedish composer, conductor, radio producer, and educator. He wrote three of the most popular works (each a suite) in Swedish art music: A Winter's Tale (En vintersaga; 1937–1938), the Pastoral Suite (Pastoralsvit; 1938), and God in Disguise (Förklädd gud; 1940). Other notable works by Larsson include three symphonies, a sinfonietta, and numerous concertante works.

== Biography ==
Larsson was born in Åkarp in 1908, the son of a factory worker and a nurse. He studied with Ernst Ellberg at the Stockholm Conservatory (1925–1929) and with Alban Berg and Fritz Reuter in Vienna and Leipzig (1929–1930), then worked for Swedish Radio and taught at the Stockholm Conservatory (1947–1959) and Uppsala University, where he held the position as Director musices (1961–1966). One of his pupils was composer Hans Eklund.

His style as a composer is eclectic, ranging from the late Romantic to techniques derived from Arnold Schoenberg's twelve-note system, but original in method. He was the first Swede to write serial music (1932). Yet other works of that period are post-Sibelian or neo-classical, and his output generally is characterized by variety of style.

He wrote for the theatre, cinema and broadcasting, in addition to the more traditional forms of symphony, concerto, chamber and vocal music.

He died of diabetes complications in Helsingborg in 1986, aged 78.

== Works ==
Larsson wrote three of the most popular works in Swedish art music:

- A Winter's Tale (En vintersaga), Op. 18 (1937–1938), four vignettes to The Winter's Tale by Shakespeare
- Pastoral Suite (Pastoralsvit), for orchestra, Op. 19 (1938)
- God in Disguise (Förklädd gud), a non-religious cantata (officially "lyrical suite") for narrator, soprano, baritone, mixed choir, and orchestra, Op. 24 (1940)

Larsson's most important symphonic works are his three symphonies for full orchestra:

- Symphony No. 1 in D major, Op. 2 (1927–1928)
- Symphony No. 2 in E minor, Op. 17 (1937)
- Symphony No. 3 in C minor, Op. 34 (1944–1945)

Larsson also wrote a Sinfonietta for string orchestra and a popular Little Serenade.

He wrote a series of Twelve Concertinos for solo instruments: flute, clarinet, bassoon, oboe, horn, trumpet, trombone, violin, viola, cello, double bass, and piano.

Larsson's Saxophone Concerto, written for Sigurd Raschèr in 1934, is one of the first major works for saxophone to utilize ideas of non-standard tonality. The Violin Concerto, Op. 42 (1952) is another important work, as is the opera Prinsessan av Cypern.

== Sources ==
- HNH Page on Larsson
- Classical Composers page
