= List of compositions by Dag Wirén =

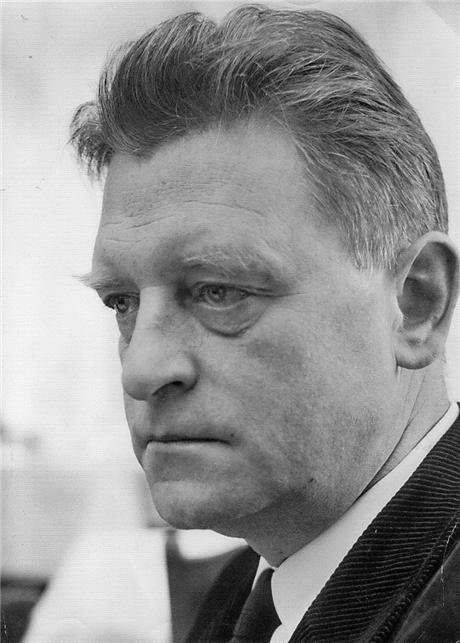
The Swedish composer Dag Wirén

The career of the Swedish composer Dag Wirén (1905–1986) spanned six decades: his earliest pieces date to 1920, while his final project—the Flute Concertino—was completed in 1972. Today, Wirén is primarily remembered for his popular Serenade for Strings (1937), especially the Marcia (No. 4), which is often performed and recorded as a stand-alone concert piece. In addition to the Serenade, Wirén's most acclaimed works are: his four extant symphonies (Nos. 2–5), written from 1938 to 1964; the Sinfonietta (1934); his four extant string quartets (again, Nos. 2–5), written from 1935 to 1970; and his three concerti, respectively, for cello (1936), violin (1946), and piano (1950). Wirén was also a prolific composer for the stage and the silver screen: he wrote original scores to ten films, three ballets, two radio operettas, and numerous plays—although none of these is particularly well-known.

== Orchestral works ==
=== Symphonies ===
- Symphony No. 1 (Op. 3, 1932; withdrawn and never performed) (Note: The First Symphony was written while Wirén was studying in Paris. A "radical experiment", it never went beyond a sketch, as Wirén abandoned the piece and refused to have it performed. In 1945, Wirén wrote on the score for the First Symphony: "Student work, should not be performed?")
- Sinfonietta, for orchestra (Op. 7a, 1933–1934, revised 1940; published by Universal Edition in 1951) (Note: From 1933 to 1934 while in Paris, Wirén attempted a four-movement second symphony. Print to its premiere in 1940, however, he opted to revise and re-orchestrate the piece as his Sinfonietta (Op. 7a), which combined a newly-composed central 'Andante espressivo' with the original outer two movements; the original interior movements were discarded but nonetheless combined as The Two Pieces for Orchestra (Op.7 b).)

1. Molto allegro ed energico—Più che doppio movimento—A tempo—Più che doppio movimento—A tempo—Meno mosso—
2. Andante espressivo—Poco più lento—Lento—
3. Molto allegro—Più lento—Più lento

- Two Pieces for Orchestra (Två orkesterstycken) (Op. 7b, 1933–1934; No. 1 published by Svensk Musik/STIM; No. 2 published by Gehrmans Musikförlag in 1941)

1. Gavotte—Musette
2. Scherzo

- Symphony No. 2, for orchestra (Op. 14, 1938–1939; published by the Swedish Art Music Society in 2000)

1. Allegro molto
2. Adagio—Allegro molto—Tempo I
3. Allegro—Più moto—Poco meno moto—Tempo primo—Meno mosso—Più mosso—Meno mosso

- Symphony No. 3, for orchestra (Op. 20, 1943–1944; published by Gehrmans Musikförlag in 1946)

1. Allegro—
2. Adagio
3. Allegro molto—Poco più moto—Tempo I—Prestissimo—Poco meno

- Symphony No. 4, for orchestra (Op. 27, 1951–1952; published by Gehrmans Musikförlag in 1954)

1. Tempo moderato
2. Molto vivace
3. Tempo moderato

- Symphony No. 5, for orchestra (Op. 38, 1963–1964; published by Gehrmans Musikförlag in 1965)

1. Moderato
2. Andante
3. Perpetuum mobile: Presto
4. Andante

=== Concertante ===
- Cello Concerto, for cello and orchestra (Op. 10, 1936; published by Gehrmans Musikförlag in 1950)

1. Tempo moderato
2. Andante espressivo
3. Allegro

- Violin Concerto, for violin and orchestra (Op. 23, 1946; published by Gehrmans Musikförlag in 1948)

1. Allegro moderato ma inquieto
2. Andante espressivo
3. Allegro molto

- Piano Concerto, for piano and orchestra (Op. 26, 1950; published by Gehrmans Musikförlag in 1952)

1. Moderato
2. Andante
3. Rondo

- Flute Concertino, for flute and small orchestra (Op. 44, 1972; published by Gehrmans Musikförlag in 1974) (Note: The Concertino for Flute and Small Orchestra is the final composition of Wirén's career.)

1. Allegro moderato
2. Calmo
3. Allegro

=== Other orchestral ===
- Concert Overture No. 1 (Konsertuvertyr Nr. 1), for orchestra (Op. 2, 1931; published by Svensk Musik/STIM)
- Serenade for Strings (Serenad för stråkar), for string orchestra (Op. 11, 1937; published by Gehrmans Musikförlag in 1944)

1. Preludium (Prelude): Allegro molto
2. Andante espressivo
3. Scherzo: Allegro vivace—Trio: Poco meno moto
4. Marcia: Tempo di marcia, molto ritmico

- Concert Overture No. 2 (Konsertuvertyr Nr. 2), for orchestra (Op. 16, 1940; published by Svensk Musik/STIM)
- Little Suite (Liten svit), for orchestra (Op. 17, 1941; published by Gehrmans Musikförlag)

1. Overture (Uvertyr)
2. Burlesque (Burlesk)
3. Finale: Molto vivace

- Romantic Suite (Romantisk svit), suite for orchestra excerpted from the music to The Merchant of Venice (Op. 22, 1943, revised 1961; published by Gehrmans Musikförlag in 1955)

1. If I Only Knew (Om jag bara visste): Andante espressivo
2. We Travel to Venice (Vi resa till Venedig): Allegretto grazioso
3. Serenade for Jessica (Serenad för Jessica): Tempo moderato, espressivo
4. Jester's Dance (Gyckeldans): Allegro
5. Portia's Palace Orchestra (Portias slottsorkester): Andante espressivo

- Comedy Overture (Lustspelsuvertyr), for orchestra (Op. 21, 1945; published by Svensk Musik/STIM)
- Ballet Suite (Balettsvit), suite for orchestra excerpted from the ballet The Oscar Ball (Op. 24a, 1949; published by Gehrmans Musikförlag in 1954)

1. Overture (Uvertyr): Allegro molto
2. The Individuals (Personager): Comodo
3. Viennese waltz (Wienervals): Tempo di Valse
4. Promenade (Promenad): Andante grazioso
5. Introduction and Polka (Introduktion och Polka): Moderato e comodo

- Divertimento (Op. 29, 1957; published by Gehrmans Musikförlag in 1959)

1. Moderato—Poco più mosso—Tempo I
2. Allegro moderato
3. Andantino—Poco meno moto—Subito tempo I—Meno moto
4. Allegro moderato—Moderato

- Triptych (Triptyk), for small orchestra (Op. 33, 1958; published by in the Swedish Art Music Society 1959)

1. Tempo moderato, ma espressivo
2. Molto allegro
3. Andante espressivo—Allegro molto

- Music for Strings (Musik för stråkorkester), for string orchestra (Op. 40, 1966–1967; published by Gehrmans Musikförlag)

1. Moderato
2. Commodo ma espressivo
3. Tempo moderato
4. Vivace

== Stage ==
=== Ballet and operetta ===
- Yellow, Red, and Blue (Gult, rött och blått), operetta produced by Swedish Radio (1940; unpublished); libretto by Georg Eliasson
- The Happy Solitaire (Den glada patiencen), operetta produced by Swedish Radio (1941; unpublished); libretto by Georg Eliasson
- The Oscar Ball (Oscarsbalen), ballet for orchestra in one act (four tableaux) produced by the Royal Swedish Opera (Op. 24, 1949; published by Gehrmans Musikförlag in 1953)

1. In the Poet's Attic (Skaldens vindskammare)
2. The High Street (Storgatan)
3. The Town Hotel Assembly Room (Stadshotellets festsal)
4. Dream in the Park (Dröm i parken)

- Take Your Places on the Stage (Plats på scenen), ballet for orchestra by Julius Mengarelli (Op. 32, 1957; published by Svensk Musik/STIM) (Note: The ballet Take Your Place on Stage was never staged due to the death of its choreographer, Julius Mengarelli.) (Note: Wirén's ballet Take Your Places on the Stage (Plats på scenen) also has been translated to English as "On Stage, Please".)
- The Evil Queen / Snow White (Den elaka drottningen / Snövit), ballet for orchestra produced by Swedish Television (Op. 34, 1960; published by Svensk Musik/STIM) (Note: Wirén's ballet The Evil Queen / Snow White (Den elaka drottningen / Snövit) also has been translated to English as "The Wicked Queen".)

=== Theatre music ===
- Madame Bovary, incidental music for ensemble (Note: Wirén's Madame Bovary is scored for clarinet, violin, cello, and piano.) to a production by Harry Rock Hansen of Flaubert's novel at the Blanche Theatre (1939; unpublished)
- The Merchant of Venice (Köpmannen i Venedig), incidental music for ensemble (Note: Wirén's The Merchant of Venice is scored for flute (doubling piccolo), oboe, clarinet, 2 trumpets, trombone, percussion, guitar, piano, celesta, string quartet, and double bass.) to a production by Alf Sjöberg of Shakespeare's play at the Royal Dramatic Theatre (1943; unpublished)
- Amorina, incidental music for chamber orchestra (Note: Wirén's Amorina is scored for clarinet, trumpet, piano/cembalo, percussion, and strings.) to a production by Alf Sjöberg of Almqvist's novel at the Royal Dramatic Theatre (1951; unpublished)
- Romeo and Juliet (Romeo och Julia), incidental music for chamber orchestra (Note: Wirén's Romeo and Juliet is scored for flute (doubling piccolo), clarinet, percussion, piano, and strings.) to a production by Alf Sjöberg of Shakespeare's play at the Royal Dramatic Theatre (1953; published by Svensk Musik/STIM)
- God's Wife (Gudens hustru), incidental music to a production by Henrik Dyfverman of Moberg's play for Swedish Radio (1954; unpublished)
- A Midsummer Night's Dream (En midsommarnattsdröm), incidental music for orchestra to a production by Alf Sjöberg of Shakespeare's play at the Royal Swedish Opera (Op. 30, 1955; published by Svensk Musik/STIM)
- The Queen's Tiara (Drottningens juvelsmycke), incidental music for ensemble (Note: Wirén's The Queen's Tiara is scored for flute, oboe, clarinet, percussion, celesta, violin, and cello.) to a production by Alf Sjöberg of Almqvist's novel at the Royal Dramatic Theatre (1957; published by Svensk Musik/STIM)
- Hamlet, incidental music for ensemble (Note: Wirén's Hamlet is scored for flute, 2 bassoons, 3 horns, 2 trumpets, trombone, timpani, percussion, guitar, cello, and double bass.) to a production by Alf Sjöberg of Shakespeare's play at the Royal Dramatic Theatre (1960; unpublished)
- King John (Kung John) incidental music for ensemble, (Note: Wirén's King John is scored for flute (doubling piccolo), 2 horns, trumpet, percussion, and organ.) to a production by Alf Sjöberg of Shakespeare's play at the Royal Dramatic Theatre (1961; published by Svensk Musik/STIM)

== Chamber works ==
=== Quartets and quintets ===
- String Quartet No. 1 (undated work; withdrawn) (Note: Wirén withdrew the String Quartet No. 1 and it is therefore not performable. It, in turn, was preceded by two other early projects for string quartet, making seven in total.)
- String Quartet No. 2 (Op. 9, 1935; published by Nordiska Musikförlaget in 1939)

1. Theme and variations (Tema med variationer): Andante
2. Scherzo: Moderato ma molto ritmico
3. Final: Prestissimo

- String Quartet No. 3 (Op. 18, 1941–1945; published by Nordiska Musikförlaget in 1946)

1. Allegro moderato
2. Andante—Vivace—Allegretto
3. Presto
4. Allegro—Prestissimo

- String Quartet No. 4 (Op. 28, 1952–1953; published by Gehrmans Musikförlag in 1955)

1. Calmo—Allegro molto—Calmo
2. Intermezzo I: Moderato
3. Intermezzo II: Prestissimo
4. Lento
5. Allegro molto

- Quartet, for flute, oboe, clarinet, and cello (Op. 31, 1956; published by Gehrmans Musikförlag in 1960)

1. Andante—Allegro moderato—Andante
2. Intermezzo: Vivace
3. Lento espressivo
4. Tema con variazioni: Andante

- String Quartet No. 5 (Op. 41, 1970; published by Gehrmans Musikförlag in 1972)

1. Allegro molto—Allegro capricioso—Tempo I
2. Andante espressivo
3. Allegro

- Quintet for Wind Instruments, for wind quintet (flute, oboe, clarinet, bassoon, and horn) (Op. 42, 1971; published by Gehrmans Musikförlag in 1973)

1. Moderato
2. Adagio
3. Allegro molto

=== Duos and trios ===
- Cello Sonatina No. 1, for cello and piano (Op. 1, 1931; published by Edition Suecia and Svensk Musik/STIM in 1969)

1. Allegro energico—
2. Adagio—
3. Molto vivace

- Cello Sonatina No. 2 in E minor, for cello and piano (Op. 4, 1933; published by Gehrmans Musikförlag in 1976) (Note: Wiren appears to have withdrawn his Second Cello Sonatina, writing of it: "Should not be performed?")

1. Allegro energico
2. Grave–Vivace
3. Allegro giocoso

- Piano Trio No. 1 in C-sharp minor (Op. 6, 1933; published by Gehrmans Musikförlag in 1963)

1. Allegro
2. Adagio
3. Fugetta
4. Alla passacaglia

- Miniature Suite No. 1, for cello and piano (Op. 8a, 1934; published by Edition Suecia in 1948)

1. Moderato
2. Adagio
3. Allegro (rubato)
4. Andante espressivo
5. Molto vivace

- Miniature Suite No. 2, for piano trio (violin, cello, and piano) (Op. 8b, 1934; published by Svensk Musik/STIM)
- Violin Sonatina, for violin and piano (Op. 15, 1940; published by the Swedish Art Music Society in 1949)

1. Allegro
2. Andantino
3. Vivace

- Piano Trio No. 2 (Op. 36, 1961; published by Gehrmans Musikförlag in 1963)

1. Andante
2. Intermezzo
3. Lento espessivo
4. Molto allegro

== Solo instrument ==
- Theme with Variations (Tema med variationer), for piano (Op. 5, 1933; published by Gehrmans Musikförlag in 1949)

1. Tema: Andante
2. Variation No. 1: L'istesso tempo
3. Variation No. 2: L'istesso tempo
4. Variation No. 3: Tempo di marcia
5. Variation No. 4: Più mosso
6. Variation No. 5: Andante
7. Variation No. 6: L'istesso tempo
8. Variation No. 7: Più mosso
9. Variation No. 8: Molto vivace
10. Variation No. 9: Allegro furioso
11. Tempo di tema

- Ironical Miniatures (Ironiska smastycken), for piano (Op. 19, 1942–1945; published by Nordiska Musikförlaget in 1947) (Note: The Ironical Miniatures was originally in six movements, but Wirén withdrew the final movements, 'American Style".)

1. Prelude (Upptakt)
2. Etude (Etyd)
3. Promenade (Promenad)
4. Waltz (Vals)
5. End (Slut)

- Piano Sonatina (Op. 25, 1950; published by Gehrmans Musikförlag in 1944)

1. Allegro moderato
2. Andante
3. Allegro

- Improvisations (Improvisationer), for piano (Op. 35, 1959; published by Gehrmans Musikförlag in 1960)

1. Largo
2. Adagio
3. Presto
4. Tempo moderato
5. Molto espressivo

- Little Serenade (Liten serenad), for guitar (Op. 39, 1964; published by Gehrmans Musikförlag in 1964)

1. Marcia
2. Preludium
3. Solo
4. Intermezzo
5. Duo lento
6. Marcia

- Little Suite for Piano (Liten pianosvit) (Op. 43, 1971; published by Gehrmans Musikförlag in 1972)

1. Vivace
2. Andantino
3. Moderato
4. Allegro

== Film scores ==
- Nothing Is Forgotten (Man glömmer ingenting), original score to a feature film by Åke Ohberg (1942; published by Svensk Musik/STIM)
- Just among Us Thieves, or A Can of Pineapples (Oss tjuvar emellan eller En burk ananas), original score to a feature film by Olof Molander (1945; unpublished)
- Green Gold (Grönt guld), original score to a documentary short by Theodor Christensen (1949)
- Only a Mother (Bara en mor), original score to a feature film by Alf Sjöberg (1949; unpublished)
- Miss Julie (Fröken Julie), original score to a feature film by Alf Sjöberg (1951; unpublished)
- A Lesson in Love (En lektion i kärlek), original score to a feature film by Ingmar Bergman (1954; unpublished)
- Wild Birds (Vildfåglar), original score to a feature film by Alf Sjöberg (1955; unpublished)
- The Phantom Carriage (Körkarlen), original score to a feature film by Arne Mattsson (1958; unpublished)
- A Matter of Morals (De sista stegen), original score to a feature film by John Cromwell (1960; unpublished)

== Vocal ==
- Titania for women's voices, words by Gustaf Fröding (1942)
- Three sea poems a capella, words by Karin Boye (1963)
- Livet och skrifterna ("En helig man"), words by Nils Ferlin (1934)
- Mitt trollslott står i skogens bryn, words by August Strindberg (1934)
- To your bed, Op. 13a, An autumn evening, Op. 13b, words by Erik Axel Karlfeldt (1938)
- Jungfru Maria and Malenavisorna, Op. 13 a-b (1938), words by Erik Axel Karlfeldt
- Annorstädes vals, words by Alf Henrikson (1965)

== Notes, references, and sources ==
Notes

Sources

- "Dag Wirén". svenskfilmdatabas.se. Swedish Film Database.
- "En midsommarnattsdröm" [A Midsummer Night's Dream] (PDF). arkivet.operan.se. Royal Swedish Opera Archives.
- "Oscarbalen" [The Oscarian Ball] (PDF). arkivet.operan.se. Royal Swedish Opera Archives.
- Åhlén, Carl-Gunnar. "List of works and discography". dagwiren.se. The Dag Wirén Foundation.
- Broman, Per (1993). Dag Wiren: Chamber Music, Volume 1 (CD booklet). Stockholm Arts Trio. BIS. p. 3–8. CD–582. OCLC 30307429
- Broman, Per (1996). Dag Wiren: Chamber Music, Volume 2 (CD booklet). Stefan Bojsten, Torleif Thedéen, Christina Högman, & Jubilate Choir. BIS. p. 4–7. CD–797. OCLC 40260304
- Jacobsson, Stig (1998). Dag Wirén: Symphonies 4 & 5 / Oscarsbalen Ballet Suite (CD booklet). Translated by Zetterqvist, Cynthia. Thomas Dausgaard & Noorköping Symphony Orchestra. cpo. p. 15–23. 999 563–2. OCLC 40723856
- Jacobsson, Stig (1999). Dag Wirén's Gyckeldans (CD booklet). Stefan Karpe & DalaSinfoniettan. Nosag. p. 9–10. CD 041. OCLC 44097921
- Jacobsson, Stig (2000). Dag Wirén: Symphonies 2 & 3 / Concert Overtures (CD booklet). Translated by Zetterqvist, Cynthia; Brant, Max. Thomas Dausgaard & Noorköping Symphony Orchestra. cpo. p. 17–27. 999 677–2. OCLC 44671003
- Jacobsson, Stig (2018). Dag Wirén: Sinfonietta / Serenade for Strings / Symphony No. 3 / Divertimento (CD booklet). Rumon Gamba & Iceland Symphony Orchestra. Chandos. p. 5–9. CHSA 5194. OCLC 1030818251
- Lindblad, Katarina (2005). Dag Wirén: String Quartets 2−5 (CD booklet). Translated by Tanner, Roger. Lysell Quartet. Daphne. p. 4−7. DAPHNE 2021. OCLC 63759623
- Uppström, Tore (2001). Dag Wirén: Sinfonietta Op. 7a / Cello Concerto Op. 10 / Romantic Suite Op. 22, from The Merchant of Venice / Symphony No. 3 (CD booklet). Stefan Solyom SAMI Sinfonietta. Phono Suecia. p. 9–13. PSCD 716. OCLC 52185426
- Whitehouse, Richard (2018). Wirén: String Quartets Nos. 2–5 (CD booklet). Wirén Quartet. Naxos. p. 3–4. 8.573588. OCLC 1089255480
