= 1946 in Nordic music =

The following is a list of notable events and compositions of the year 1946 in Nordic music.

== Events ==
- 1 September – Norway's Kringkastingsorkestret, KORK, (Norwegian Radio Orchestra) is founded.
- unknown date – Jean Sibelius composes his final completed works: — "Veljesvirsi" and "Ylistyshymni", two movements of his Masonic Ritual Music for voice and harmonium, Op. 113.

== New works ==
- Einar Englund – Symphony no 1 ("War Symphony")
- Skarphéðinn Þorkelsson – Fimmtán sönglög
- Dag Wirén – Violin Concerto

== Popular music ==
- Alf Prøysen – "Musevisa"

== Film music ==
- Sven Gyldmark – Så mødes vi hos Tove
- Alvar Kraft – Klockorna i Gamla sta'n

== Births ==
- 13 January – Eero Koivistoinen, Finnish jazz saxophonist
- 14 January – Ann-Elise Hannikainen, Finnish composer (died 2012)
- 29 June – Gitte Hænning, Danish singer and actress
- 2 May – Ralf Gothóni, Finnish pianist, conductor and composer
- 2 December – Jaakko Ryhänen, Finnish operatic bass and teacher
- 16 December – Benny Andersson, Swedish musician, songwriter, composer and producer (ABBA)
- 17 December – Pepe Willberg, Finnish guitarist, singer and songwriter

== Deaths ==
- 4 March – Gustaf Hjalmar Heintze, Swedish pianist, organist and composer (born 1879)
- 26 April – Oluf Ring, Danish composer (born 1884)
- 30 April – Olav Gunnarsson Helland, Norwegian Hardanger fiddle maker (born 1875)
- 10 July – Björn Schildknecht, Swedish composer (born 1905)
- 31 August – Paul von Klenau, Danish conductor and composer (born 1883)

== See also ==
- 1946 in Denmark
- 1946 in Iceland
- 1946 in Norwegian music
- 1946 in Sweden
