= Aulin =

Aulin may refer to:

== People ==
- Ewa Aulin (born 1950) Swedish actress
- Jared Aulin (born 1982), Canadian professional hockey centre
- Tor Aulin (1866–1914), Swedish violinist, conductor and composer
- Valborg Aulin (1860–1928), Swedish pianist and composer

== Other uses ==
- Glen Aulin, a segment of the Tuolumne River valley, upriver from the Grand Canyon of the Tuolumne
- Aulin, a brand name for Nimesulide
