= String Quartet No. 4 (Stenhammar) =

Composition for string quartet by Wilhelm Stenhammar

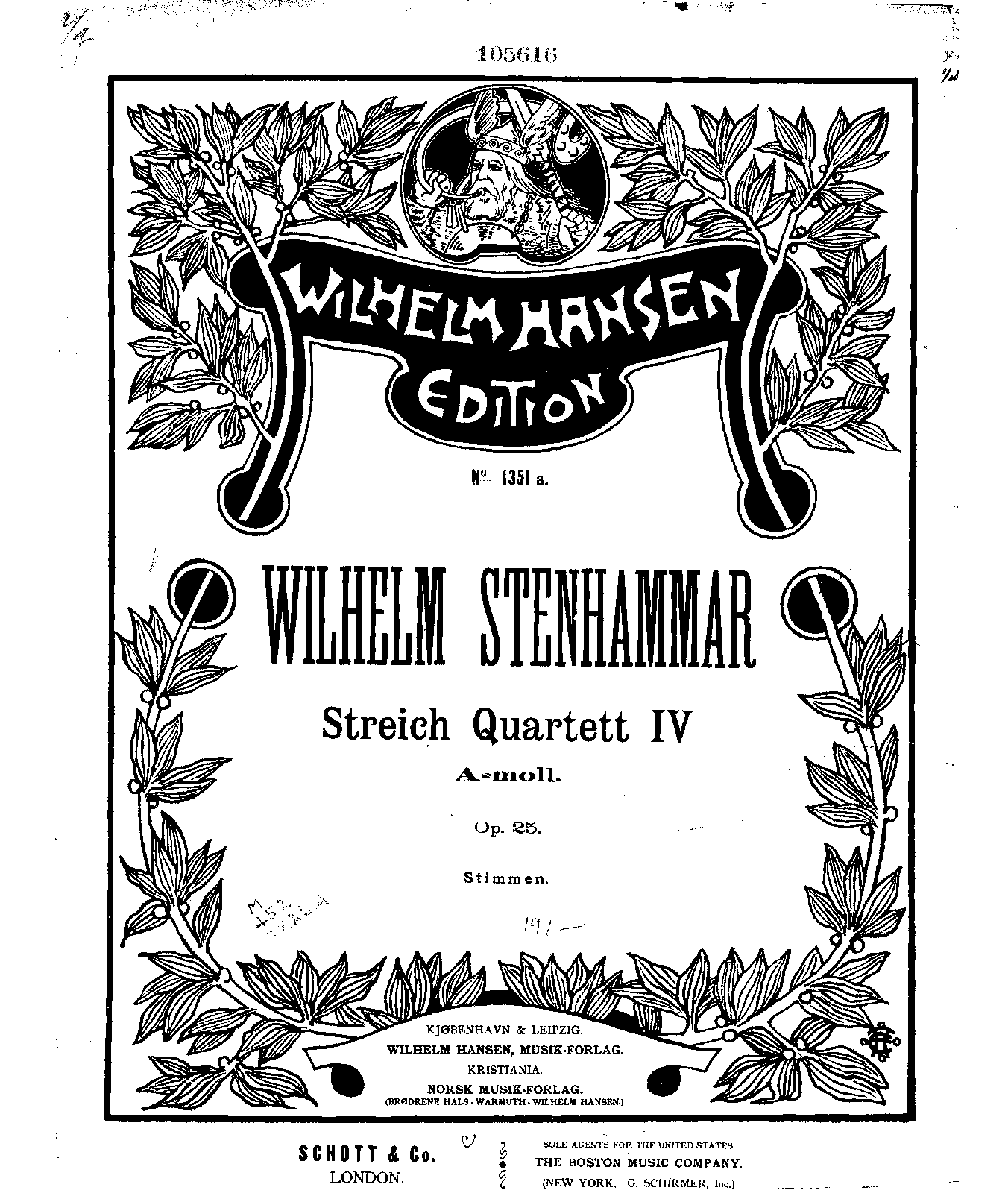
Front cover of the score, published by Edition Wilhelm Hansen.

The String Quartet No. 4 in A minor, Op. 25, is the fourth in a cycle of six numbered string quartets written by Swedish composer Wilhelm Stenhammar. In four movements, the work was completed in 1909 and the premiere performance was given by the Aulin Quartet in Stockholm in 1910. The score was published by Edition Wilhelm Hansen in 1912. Stenhammar dedicated the work to his fellow composer, contemporary, and friend, Jean Sibelius.

== Background and gestation ==
Stenhammar had completed the third in his cycle of six numbered string quartets in 1900, and almost a decade was to pass before he completed another. At this time, his principal source of income was from public concert performances, as pianist or conductor, commitments that significantly limited the time he could devote to composition. Work on String Quartet No. 4 began in 1904. Sketches for the first movement were made but not developed until the winter of 1906/07, in Florence, where Stenhammar had the opportunity to take sabbatical leave from his heavy performance schedule. On his return to Sweden, he was appointed principal conductor of the Gothenburg Symphony Orchestra, a post he would hold for the next fifteen years, and time for composing became limited mostly to the summer months. The remaining movements of the quartet were completed in August, 1909, during a summer vacation with his family on the shores of Lake Vättern.

The eminent Swedish music scholar Bo Wallner has noted that the 5-year time span over which this quartet was written marks a period of remarkable inspiration in Stenhammar's career as a composer, notwithstanding his other commitments. Notable works completed in this time period also include the Cantata Et Folk, Op. 22, the Piano Concerto No. 2, Op. 23, and the rhapsody Midvinter for mixed chorus and orchestra, Op. 24.

== Dedication ==
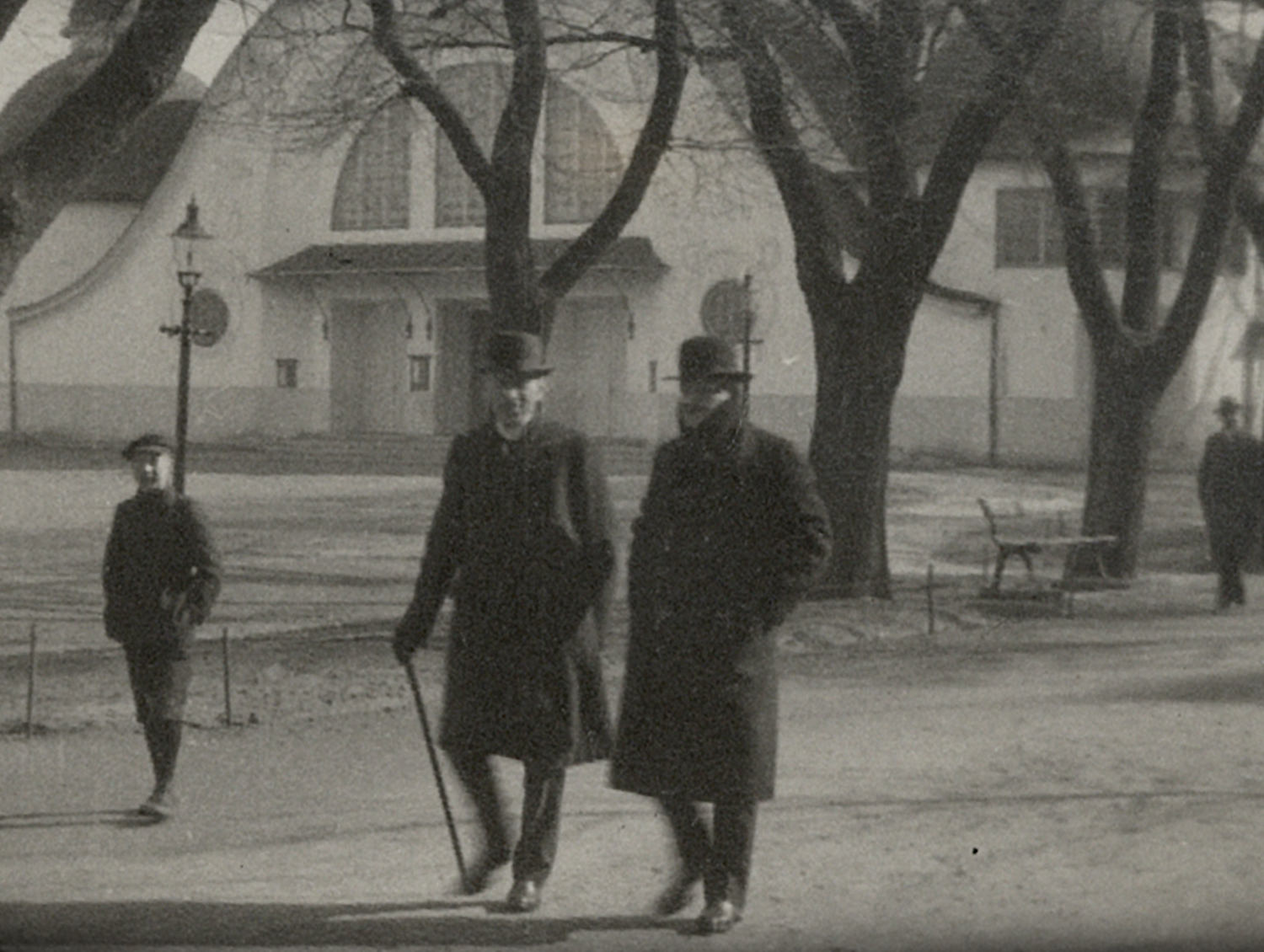
Composers Wilhelm Stenhammar (center left) and Jean Sibelius (center right) walking outside of the Concert Hall in Gothenburg, Sweden, in 1923. (Photograph from the Wilhelm Stenhammar archive, Gothenburg University Library).

Stenhammar had originally intended to dedicate his Symphony No. 1 in F major to Sibelius. Although the symphony was well received at its premiere performance in 1903, Stenhammar himself was dissatisfied and decided to withdraw the work. A few weeks previously he had attended the Swedish premiere of Sibelius's Symphony No. 2, which had made a deep impression on him, and he considered his own symphony to be inadequate in comparison. Stenhammar's wish to create a work he considered worthy of dedication to Sibelius was later realized in the String Quartet No. 4. Sibelius, in return, dedicated his Symphony No. 6, completed in 1923, to Stenhammar.

== Structure ==
In common with many string quartets written in the classical style, Stenhammar's String Quartet No. 4 follows a traditional four-movement structure:

1. Allegro ma non troppo (in A minor)
2. Adagio (in A major)
3. Scherzo: Allegro (in C major)
4. Aria variata: Andante semplice (in A minor)

The 4th movement consists of a theme followed by 11 variations and a coda, in which the theme is based on the Swedish folk song Och riddaren han talte till unga Hillevi (And the Knight Spoke to Young Hillevi). A typical performance of the entire work lasts for approximately 34 minutes.

== Reception and status ==
Stenhammar's String Quartet No. 4 was premiered by the Aulin Quartet before an invited audience in Strindberg's Intimate Theater in Stockholm on January 10, 1910. Public performances followed later that year, on March 7 in Gothenburg and on November 10th in Stockholm. Critical reception was initially somewhat cool. Bo Wallner suggests that this may have arisen because the work was beyond the Aulin Quartet's capacities; the Quartet's leader, Tor Aulin, was by then in declining mental and physical health.

In subsequent years, the work has been performed, recorded, and favorably reassessed. Several Swedish string quartets included it regularly in their concert programs, and the work received international recognition in 1973 with the release of a recording by the Vlach Quartet on the Deutsche Grammophon label. Writing in The Chamber Music Journal, Raymond Silvertrust opines that it is unquestionably a very fine work by any standard: poetic, ingeniously chromatic, with an extraordinary idyllic and ethereal finale. Writing in the booklet accompanying the BIS recording by the eponymous Stenhammar Quartet, Signe Rotter-Broman notes that, notwithstanding the circumstances of its creation, the quartet is a cogent, highly integrated work, displaying command of a wide range of traditions and models, and artistry in the transformation of motifs. She considers it to be the most important of Stenhammar's string quartets.

== Recordings ==
The online database Discogs includes several recordings of Stenhammar's String Quartet No. 4, listed below in chronological order of release date. Originally released on physical formats (LP records, compact discs), most are also now available as digital downloads and on music streaming services.

- Vlach Quartet: Deutsche Grammophon 2530 396 (1973)
- Gotland Quartet: Caprice Records CAP 1201-03 (1983)
- Grünfarb Quartet: Caprice Records CAP 21504 (1991; recorded at a public concert in Stockholm, June 1964)
- Oslo String Quartet: cpo 777 426-2 (2011)
- Stenhammar Quartet: BIS Records BIS-1659 (2013)
