= Op. 14 =

In music, Op. 14 stands for Opus number 14. Compositions that are assigned this number include:

- Adès – Powder Her Face
- Barber – Violin Concerto
- Bartók – Suite, Op. 14
- Beethoven – Piano Sonata No. 9
- Beethoven – Piano Sonata No. 10
- Berlioz – Symphonie fantastique
- Chopin – Rondo à la Krakowiak
- Duruflé – Notre Père
- Dvořák – King and Charcoal Burner
- Fauré – Violin Concerto (unfinished)
- Haas – Šarlatán
- Ilyich – Vakula the Smith
- Larsson – Saxophone Concerto, for saxophone and strings (1934)
- Mendelssohn – Rondo capriccioso
- Nielsen – String Quartet No. 3
- Paderewski – Minuet in G
- Prokofiev – Piano Sonata No. 2
- Saint-Saëns - Piano Quintet in A minor
- Schumann – Piano Sonata No. 3
- Shostakovich – Symphony No. 2
- Sibelius – Rakastava (The Lover), for orchestra (arranged 1911 [1894], revised 1912)
- Strauss – Wandrers Sturmlied
- Wieniawski – Violin Concerto No. 1
- Wirén – Symphony No. 2 (1939)
