= Symphony No. 4 (Wirén) =

Symphony in three movements by Dag Wirén

- by Dag Wirén
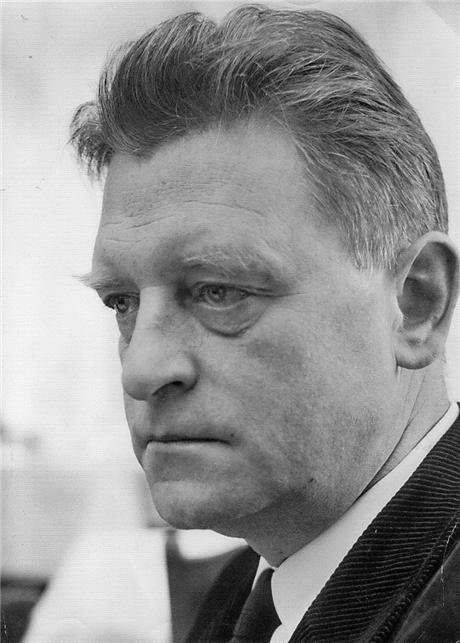
- The composer, c. 1940s
- Opus: 27
- Composed: 1951–1952
- Dedication: none
- Publisher: Gehrmans Musikförlag (1954)
- Duration: Approx. 17.5 minutes
- Movements: 3

Premiere
- Date: 30 November 1952
- Location: Stockholm, Sweden
- Conductor: Sten Frykberg
- Performers: Swedish Radio Symphony Orchestra

The Symphony No. 4, Op. 27, is a three-movement orchestral composition written from 1951 to 1952 by the Swedish composer Dag Wirén. Despite its numbering, the Fourth Symphony represents Wirén's third contribution to the form as a professional (the composer withdrew the Symphony No. 1, Op. 3—a 1932 experimental "study work" from his student years in Paris—and prohibited its performance), arriving eight years after its predecessor, the Symphony No. 3. Swedish conductor Sten Frykberg premiered the new symphony with the Swedish Radio Symphony Orchestra in Stockholm on 30 November 1952, and critics would eventually praise it as "one of the best Swedish symphonies of the fifties". At 17 minutes, the Fourth is the shortest, most concentrated of Wirén's four essays in the genre. Stylistically, it is austere and intellectual, recalling in particular the "desolate... Nordic tone" of late-period Sibelius.

== Structure ==
The Fourth Symphony is in three movements. They are as follows:

1. Tempo moderato
2. Molto vivace
3. Tempo moderato

A transparency score is archived at The Music and Theatre Library of Sweden.

== Orchestration ==
- Woodwind: 2 flutes, 2 oboes, 2 clarinets, 2 bassoons
- Brass: 4 horns, 2 trumpets, 3 trombones, tuba
- Percussion: timpani
- Strings: violins, violas, cellos, double basses

== Recordings ==
To date, there are two commercial recordings of the Fourth Symphony, the most recent of which cpo released in 1998:

Conductor	Orchestra	Recorded	Duration	Label
Thomas Dausgaard	Norrköping Symphony Orchestra	1997	18:31	cpo (999563-2)
Sixten Ehrling	Swedish Radio Symphony Orchestra	1956	16:08	Swedish Society (SCD-1035)

The Dausgaard recording has received generally positive reviews. ClassicsToday.com's David Hurwitz, for example, praises the Fourth Symphony (and its disc partner, the Symphony No. 5) as "truly memorable" works by "a grossly underrated composer", in particular applauding Wirén for his "exceptional ingenuity" in variation technique and for his "staggeringly efficient and colorful orchestration". Hurwitz concludes: "These symphonies are magnificent mosaics so beautifully sculpted and so easy to follow that they truly deserve the widest dissemination among music lovers". Fanfare's Paul Snook describes the Fourth favorably, noting that it "generates a great deal of tension and momentum that are finally and satisfactorily resolved in the dramatically repeated closing chords"; he also labels the disc "an excellent introduction" to Wirén and his "severely enigmatic late style". The American Record Guide's David Raymond, in contrast to Hurwitz and Snook, dismisses the Symphonies Nos. 4 and 5 as "strange music curiously lacking in character and exud[ing] little emotional warmth or individuality".

=== Sources ===
CD liner notes

- Jacobsson, Stig (1998). Dag Wiren: Symphonies Nos. 4 and 5, Oscarsbalen ballet suite (booklet). Thomas Dausgaard & Norrköping Symphony Orchestra. Germany: cpo. p. 15–23. 999563-2.
- Jacobsson, Stig (2000). Dag Wiren: Symphonies Nos. 2 and 3, Concert Overtures (booklet). Thomas Dausgaard & Norrköping Symphony Orchestra. Germany: cpo. p. 17–27. 999677-2.

Websites

- Åhlén, Carl-Gunnar (n.d.). "List of works and discography". dagwiren.se (The Dag Wirén Foundation).
- Gehrmans Musikförlag (n.d.). "Symfoni Nr. 4 (Symphony No. 4)". gehrmans.se.

Music criticism

- Hurwitz, David (2018). "Major Discoveries: Wirén's Exquisite Fourth and Fifth Symphonies". ClassicsToday.com. (subscription required)
- Raymond, David (1998). "Wirén: Symphonies 4+5; Oscarsbalen Suite". American Record Guide. 61 (6): 243. (subscription required)
- Snook, Paul (1999). "Wirén Symphonies: No. 4; No. 5. Oscarbalen: Ballet Suite". Fanfare Magazine. 22 (3): 275–76. (subscription required)
