= Friedrich Kiel =

German composer and music educator (1821–1885)

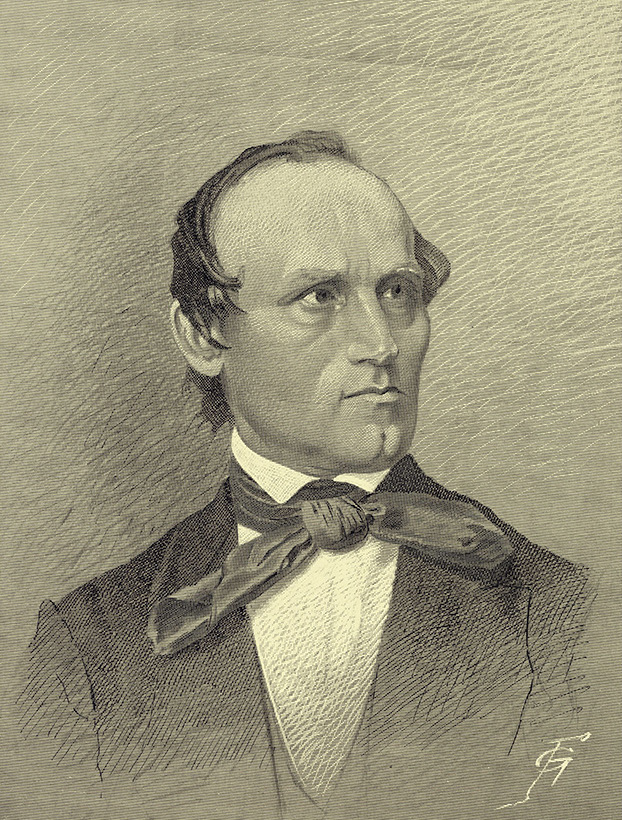
Kiel by F. Garibotti

Friedrich Kiel (8 October 1821 – 13 September 1885) was a German composer and music educator.

Writing of the chamber music of Friedrich Kiel, the scholar and critic Wilhelm Altmann notes that it was Kiel’s extreme modesty which kept him and his exceptional works from receiving the consideration they deserved. After mentioning Johannes Brahms and others, Altmann writes, "He produced a number of chamber works, which . . . need fear no comparison".

== Biography ==
Kiel was born on 8 October 1821, in Bad Laasphe. He was taught the rudiments of music and received his first piano lessons from his father, but was in large part self-taught. Something of a prodigy, he played the piano almost without instruction at the age of six, and by his thirteenth year he had composed much music. Kiel eventually came to the attention of Prince Albrecht Sayn-Wittgenstein-Berleburg, a great music lover. Through the Prince's efforts, Kiel was allowed to study violin with the concertmaster of the Prince’s fine orchestra with which he later performed as a soloist. Kiel was also given theory lessons from the renowned flautist Kaspar Kummer. By 1840, Kiel was court conductor and the music teacher to the prince’s children. Two years later, Louis Spohr heard him and arranged for a scholarship which allowed Kiel to study in Berlin with the renowned theorist and teacher Siegfried Dehn. In Berlin, Kiel eventually became sought after as an instructor. In 1866, he received a teaching position at the prestigious Stern conservatory, where he taught composition and was elevated to a professorship three years later. In 1870 he joined the faculty of the newly founded Hochschule für Musik which was shortly thereafter considered one of the finest music schools in Germany. For his many students See: List of music students by teacher: K to M#Friedrich Kiel.

Kiel's hobby was mountaineering and at age 60, he climbed Europe's second highest peak, the Monte Rosa, on the Swiss-Italian border. In September 1883 he was involved in a traffic accident with a coach. His injuries eventually forced him to retire shortly before his death in September 1885.

== Compositions ==
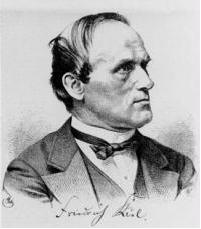

Kiel's compositions number over seventy, including a piano concerto, motets, oratorios (including the Star of Bethlehem), as well as a Missa Solemnis and two Requiems.

Chamber music comprises a considerable part of Kiel's output and must be regarded among his most important and best compositions. (See list below) Altmann noted that, "throughout my long life, I have found Kiel’s chamber music a never-failing source of delight". He praised Kiel highly as a melodist and lamented that it was "scandalously unjust" that Kiel’s two string quartets were as good as forgotten. Writing about Kiel's two Piano Quintets Opp. 75 & 76 in The Chamber Music Journal, R. H. R. Silvertrust remarks, "Both of these quintets are as fine as any in the entire literature". Several of his chamber works, along with the piano concerto and some choral works, have been recorded.
