= No. 4 =

No. 4 may refer to:

- The number 4
- No. 4, a 1966 experimental film directed by Yoko Ono
- No. 4 (album), by the rock band Stone Temple Pilots
- No. 4 Commando, Commando regiment in the UK Army
- No. 4 Squadron RAAF, Royal Australian Air Force squadron
- No. 4 Squadron RAF, Royal Air Force squadron
- String Quartet No. 4 (disambiguation), the title of compositions by multiple composers
- Symphony No. 4 (disambiguation), the title of compositions by multiple composers
