= String Quartet No. 4 =

String Quartet No. 4 may refer to:

- String Quartet No. 4 (Babbitt) by Milton Babbitt
- String Quartet No. 4 (Bartók) by Béla Bartók
- String Quartet No. 4 (Beethoven) by Ludwig van Beethoven
- String Quartet No. 4 (Bois), The Independent by Rob du Bois
- String Quartet No. 4 (Bridge) by Frank Bridge
- String Quartet No. 4 (Carter) by Elliott Carter
- String Quartet No. 4 (Diamond) by David Diamond
- String Quartet No. 4 (Dvořák) by Antonín Dvořák
- String Quartet No. 4 (Ferneyhough) by Brian Ferneyhough
- String Quartet No. 4 (Glass) by Philip Glass
- String Quartet No. 4 (Halffter) by Cristóbal Halffter
- String Quartet No. 4 (Hill) by Alfred Hill
- String Quartet No. 4 (Hiller), Illiac Suite by Lejaren Hiller
- String Quartet No. 4 (Hindemith), Op. 22, by Paul Hindemith
- String Quartet No. 4 (Kirchner) by Leon Kirchner
- String Quartet No. 4 (McCabe) by John McCabe
- String Quartet No. 4 (Maconchy) by Elizabeth Maconchy
- String Quartet No. 4 (Marco), Los desastres de la guerra by Tomás Marco
- String Quartet No. 4 (Mendelssohn) by Felix Mendelssohn
- String Quartet No. 4 (Milhaud), Op. 46, by Darius Milhaud
- String Quartet No. 4 (Mozart) by Wolfgang Amadeus Mozart
- String Quartet No. 4 (Nielsen) by Carl Nielsen
- String Quartet No. 4 (Oswald) by Henrique Oswald
- String Quartet No. 4 (Persichetti) Parable X, Op. 122, by Vincent Persichetti
- String Quartet No. 4 (Piston) by Walter Piston
- String Quartet No. 4 (Porter) by Quincy Porter
- String Quartet No. 4 (Revueltas), Música de feria by Silvestre Revueltas
- String Quartet No. 4 (Rihm) by Wolfgang Rihm
- String Quartet No. 4 (Schoenberg) by Arnold Schoenberg
- String Quartet No. 4 (Schubert) by Franz Schubert
- String Quartet No. 4 (Shostakovich) by Dmitri Shostakovich
- String Quartet No. 4 (Stenhammar) by Wilhelm Stenhammar
- String Quartet No. 4 (Tippett) by Michael Tippett
- String Quartet No. 4 (Villa-Lobos) by Heitor Villa-Lobos
