= Kaspar Kummer =

German flautist, professor, and composer

Kaspar Johann Kummer (1795–1870) was a German flautist, professor and composer.

Kummer was born on 10 December 1795 in the Erlau district of Schleusingen, Thuringia. He taught himself the flute while learning violin, horn, trumpet, clarinet, bassoon, oboe, viola, cello, and double bass.

Kummer was taught by a Schleusingen musician, Neumeister for a year, then took training in music theory from the Cantor of Schleusingen, Gottlob Abraham Stäps. From 1813, he worked as a flautist at the chapel of the Duke Erst I of Coburg.

His compositions, numbering over 150, include flute concertos, quartets and quintets for flutes and strings, and duos and trios for flutes; he also wrote a flute method book.

He had several students, including Friedrich Kiel and Felix Draeseke.

He died on 21 May 1870, in Coburg.
