= Symphony No. 2 (Wirén) =

Symphony in three movements by Dag Wirén

- by Dag Wirén
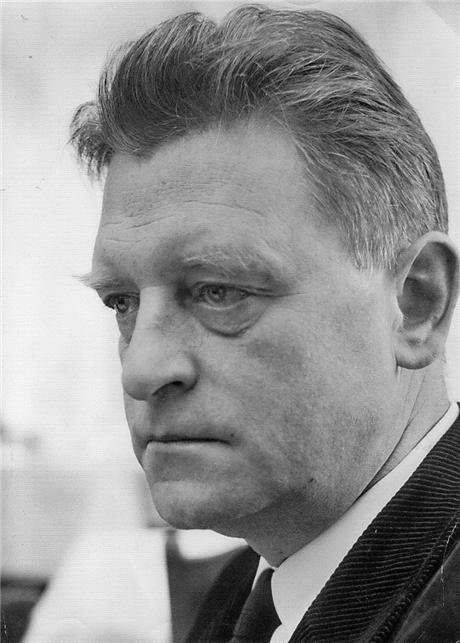
- The composer, c. 1940s
- Opus: 14
- Composed: 1938–1939
- Dedication: The composer's wife, Noel
- Publisher: Swedish Art Music Society (2000)
- Duration: Approx. 30 minutes
- Movements: 3

Premiere
- Date: 13 October 1940
- Location: Gothenburg, Sweden
- Conductor: Sixten Eckerberg
- Performers: Gothenburg Symphony Orchestra

The Symphony No. 2, Op. 14, is a three-movement orchestral composition written from 1938 to 1939 by the Swedish composer Dag Wirén. Despite its numbering, the Second Symphony represents Wirén's first contribution to the form as a professional. (The composer withdrew the Symphony No. 1, Op. 3—a 1932 experimental "study work" from his student years in Paris—and prohibited its performance.) Swedish conductor Sixten Eckerberg premiered the new symphony with the Gothenburg Symphony Orchestra in Gothenburg on 13 October 1940. Although the public received the premiere positively, the critics cautioned that the new work was mildly derivative of Carl Nielsen. At 30 minutes, the Second is the longest of Wirén's four essays in the genre, as well as, stylistically, the most late-Romantic and pastoral of the set.

== History ==
Wirén's path to becoming a professional symphonist was a torturous one, filled with self-doubt. In 1932, while studying orchestration in Paris under Russian composer Leonid Sabaneyev, Wirén had begun his first attempt in the form, the Symphony No. 1, Op. 3. Despite receiving a catalog number, this piece never progressed beyond sketches (now housed in the archives of The Music and Theatre Library of Sweden) and was rejected by the composer as an "immature, radical experiment" undeserving of performance. From 1933 to 1934, Wirén tackled a new attempt at a symphony, producing a four-movement piece—but, before it could be premiered, he revised and divided it into two smaller works: the Sinfonietta, Op. 7a, in which Wirén paired the original two outer movements with a newly composed Andante; and Two Orchestral Pieces, Op. 7b, consisting of the two withdrawn inner movements, a Gavotte–Musette and a Scherzo.

Following the success of 1937's Serenade for Strings, Op. 11, Wirén returned to the symphonic form for a third time; the result was the three-movement Symphony No. 2, which he had composed primarily in Sweden, but also while on vacation to visit his in-laws in Ireland. The symphony received its premiere on 13 October 1940, with Sixten Eckerberg leading the Gothenburg Symphony Orchestra. While the public received the new work warmly, the critics were a bit more tepid in their response. Ture Rangström and Kurt Atterberg (by 1940, composers of four and six symphonies, respectively) commented that the Second was "rather trifling in sections" and lacking in musical themes, although each was overall appreciative of Wirén's contribution to the Swedish symphonic canon. Other critics remarked that the symphony was Nielsen-ian in character, while others pondered its merits as a serenade, due to its light, delicate nature and the paucity of sharp symphonic contrasts. The critics would come around by at least 1942, performances of which they praised.

== Structure ==
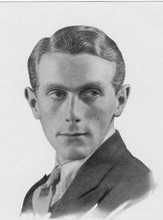
Sixten Eckerberg (c. 1935), who premiered the Second Symphony in 1940.

The Second Symphony is in three movements. They are as follows:

1. Allegro molto
2. Adagio — Allegro molto — Tempo I
3. Allegro — Più moto — Poco meno moto — Tempo primo — Meno mosso — Più mosso — Meno mosso

The first movement consists of three main subjects, A, B, and C. The lively, dance-like A section, first introduced on the upper woodwinds and strings, is met by an ominous bassoon melody (B), eventually picked up by the horns and lower strings. After a brief back-and-forth between A and B, a solo flute introduces the third subject, C, which is a pastoral and heroic in character. The development section transforms and mingles all three main subjects, and the recapitulation section presents A, B, and C in the same order, but with increased energy. The movement ends warmly on C, albeit quietly.

A pencil score is archived at The Music and Theatre Library of Sweden. In 2000, six decades after its composition, the Swedish Art Music Society published Wirén's Symphony No. 2 (edited by Tore Uppström).

== Orchestration ==
- Woodwind: 2 flutes, 2 oboes, 2 clarinets, 2 bassoons
- Brass: 2 horns, 2 trumpets, 3 trombones, tuba
- Percussion: timpani
- Strings: violins, violas, cellos, double basses

== Recordings ==
To date, there is one commercial recording of the Second Symphony, which cpo released in 2000:

Conductor	Orchestra	Recorded	Duration	Label
Thomas Dausgaard	Norrköping Symphony Orchestra	1999	30:26	cpo (999677-2)

The Dausgaard recording has received generally positive reviews. ClassicsToday.com's David Hurwitz, for example, describes the Second as "all pastoral sunshine, vigorous energy, and glorious lyricism". Furthermore, he detects in the Second Symphony (and its disc partner, the Symphony No. 3) echoes of Jean Sibelius and Carl Nielsen, concluding: "Not a bad combination! In fact, Wirén's symphonic achievement rubs shoulders easily with the 20th century's finest works in the form". Fanfare's Paul Snook describes the Second as a youthful, "slightly self-indulgent" work ("Sibelius-lite") in which "the composer had yet to perfect his distinctive brand of immaculate and transparent economy and concision"; nevertheless, he labels the disc "a welcome and necessary addition to the Swedish recorded repertoire" that "points to the mature Wirén". The American Record Guide's Mark Lehman praises the "splendid" Symphonies Nos. 2 and 3 as "overflow[ing] with an untroubled but mysterious joy", noting in particular their "pantheistic expansiveness and dewy-fresh orchestral transparency".

== References and sources ==
=== Sources ===
CD liner notes

- Jacobsson, Stig (2000). Dag Wiren: Symphonies Nos. 2 and 3, Concert Overtures (booklet). Thomas Dausgaard & Norrköping Symphony Orchestra. Germany: cpo. p. 17–27. 999677-2.

Websites

- Åhlén, Carl-Gunnar (n.d.). "List of works and discography". dagwiren.se (The Dag Wirén Foundation).

Music criticism

- Hurwitz, David (2018). "Major Discoveries: Wirén Symphonies Nos. 2 and 3". ClassicsToday.com. (subscription required)
- Lehman, Mark (2000). "Wirén: Symphonies 2+3; Overtures 1+2". American Record Guide. 63 (6): 252. (subscription required)
- Snook, Paul (2000). "Wirén Symphonies: No. 2; No. 3. Concert Overtures: No. 1; No. 2". Fanfare Magazine. 24 (1): 312–13. (subscription required)
