= Symphony No. 5 (Wirén) =

Symphony in four movements by Dag Wirén

- by Dag Wirén
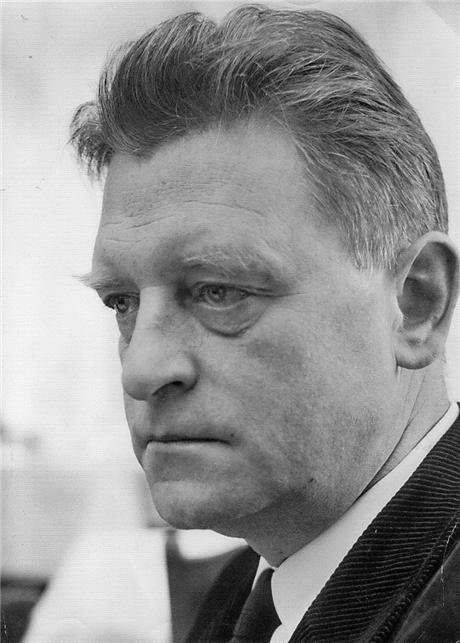
- The composer, c. 1940s
- Opus: 38
- Composed: 1963–1964
- Dedication: none
- Publisher: Gehrmans Musikförlag (1965)
- Duration: Approx. 22 minutes
- Movements: 4

Premiere
- Date: 5 December 1964
- Location: Stockholm, Sweden
- Conductor: Sixten Ehrling
- Performers: Swedish Radio Symphony Orchestra

The Symphony No. 5, Op. 38, is a four-movement orchestral composition written from 1963 to 1964 by the Swedish composer Dag Wirén. Despite its numbering, the Fifth Symphony represents Wirén's fourth, and final, contribution to the form as a professional (the composer withdrew the Symphony No. 1, Op. 3—a 1932 experimental "study work" from his student years in Paris—and prohibited its performance), arriving twelve years after its predecessor, the Symphony No. 4. Swedish conductor Sixten Ehrling premiered the new symphony with the Swedish Radio Symphony Orchestra in Stockholm on 5 December 1964.

== Structure ==
The Fifth Symphony is in four movements. They are as follows:

1. Moderato
2. Andante
3. Perpetuum mobile: Presto
4. Andante

A transparency score is archived at The Music and Theatre Library of Sweden.

== Orchestration ==
- Woodwind: 2 flutes, 2 oboes, 2 clarinets, 2 bassoons
- Brass: 4 horns, 3 trumpets, 3 trombones, tuba
- Percussion: timpani
- Strings: violins, violas, cellos, double basses

== Recordings ==
To date, there is one commercial recording of the Fifth Symphony, which cpo released in 1998:

Conductor	Orchestra	Recorded	Duration	Label
Thomas Dausgaard	Norrköping Symphony Orchestra	1997	22:37	cpo (999563-2)

The Dausgaard recording has received generally positive reviews. ClassicsToday.com's David Hurwitz, for example, praises the Fifth Symphony (and its disc partner, the Symphony No. 4) as "truly memorable" works by "a grossly underrated composer", in particular applauding Wirén for his "exceptional ingenuity" in variation technique and for his "staggeringly efficient and colorful orchestration". Hurwitz concludes: "These symphonies are magnificent mosaics so beautifully sculpted and so easy to follow that they truly deserve the widest dissemination among music lovers". Fanfare's Paul Snook, describing the Fifth as a "somewhat darker and slightly more expansive work" than the Fourth, labels the disc "an excellent introduction" to Wirén and his "severely enigmatic late style". The American Record Guide's David Raymond, in contrast to Hurwitz and Snook, dismisses the Symphonies Nos. 4 and 5 as "strange music curiously lacking in character and exud[ing] little emotional warmth or individuality".

=== Sources ===
CD liner notes

- Jacobsson, Stig (1998). Dag Wirén: Symphonies Nos. 4 and 5, Oscarsbalen ballet suite (booklet). Thomas Dausgaard & Norrköping Symphony Orchestra. Germany: cpo. p. 15–23. 999563-2.
- Jacobsson, Stig (2000). Dag Wirén: Symphonies Nos. 2 and 3, Concert Overtures (booklet). Thomas Dausgaard & Norrköping Symphony Orchestra. Germany: cpo. p. 17–27. 999677-2.

Websites

- Åhlén, Carl-Gunnar (n.d.). "List of works and discography". dagwiren.se (The Dag Wirén Foundation).
- Gehrmans Musikförlag (n.d.). "Symfoni Nr. 5 (Symphony No. 5)". gehrmans.se.

Music criticism

- Hurwitz, David (2018). "Major Discoveries: Wirén's Exquisite Fourth and Fifth Symphonies". ClassicsToday.com. (subscription required)
- Raymond, David (1998). "Wirén: Symphonies 4+5; Oscarsbalen Suite". American Record Guide. 61 (6): 243. (subscription required)
- Snook, Paul (1999). "Wirén Symphonies: No. 4; No. 5. Oscarbalen: Ballet Suite". Fanfare Magazine. 22 (3): 275–76. (subscription required)
