= Valborg Aulin =

Swedish pianist and composer

- Born: Laura Valborg Aulin; January 9, 1860; Gävle, Sweden
- Died: March 13, 1928 (aged 68); Örebro, Sweden
- Occupations: Composer, conductor
- Era: Romantic

Laura Valborg Aulin (9 January 1860 – 13 March 1928) was a Swedish pianist and composer. Aulin's String Quartet in E minor, Op. 17 and String Quartet in F minor are the most important Swedish music compositions in that genre from the 1880s.

== Life ==
Aulin was born in Gävle, Sweden, in 1860. Both of her parents, Lars Axel Alfred and Edla Aulin née Holmberg, were musical. Her mother, Edla Aulin had hoped for a career as a singer, but bad health had stopped her career. Aulin's father was a classics scholar, holding a doctorate in Greek, on the poet Callimachus. He also held a position at a Stockholm secondary school, where he taught classical languages. While he was a student at Uppsala University, Aulin's father developed an understanding and appreciation of chamber music, eventually becoming a keen amateur violinist, eventually leading to a position in the Mazer String Quartet Society, playing viola and violin.

Aulin's musical career began when she started taking piano lessons from her grandmother and by age 12 was taking lessons from Hilda Thegerström. Aulin eventually came to the notice of Albert Rubenson, the then current director of the Royal Swedish Academy of Music. An enrolment at the academy followed when Aulin was 17, to study composition with Rubenson. Aulin was also tutored at the Royal College of Music, Stockholm by Herman Behrens and Ludvig Norman. Norman was an important supporter of Aulin for most of her life and when Norman died in 1885, she composed the Pie Jesu Domine for choir and orchestra. In 1880, Aulin held her first public performance at Söderköping, and went on tour with her brother Tor Aulin to Norrland. Aulin studied piano and composition for five years before winning a Jenny Lind Mendelssohn Travelling Fellowship to attend piano tutorials abroad. In 1886, Aulin travelled to Copenhagen to study under Niels Wilhelm Gade for a year and in 1887, travelled to Paris for three years to receive composition lessons from female pianist E. Bourgain as well as Jules Massenet, Ernest Guiraud and Benjamin Godard. In Paris, Aulin created two works, Tableaux Parisiens for orchestra and Procul este for solo voice, choir and string orchestra.

Upon returning to Sweden, Aulin began a career as a teacher, pianist and composer. In 1890, she joined the women's association Nya Idun. As a teacher, she supplemented her income by teaching piano, counterpoint, composition and harmony. At the same time Aulin was composing and between 1887 and 1901 she gave recitals of her compositions. As a pianist she often played with her brother, Tor Aulin, and others to form the Aulin Quartet, playing favourites like Camille Saint-Saëns' Piano Quartet and Wolfgang Amadeus Mozart's G Minor quartet.

Besides many lieder and pieces for solo piano, her compositions included two string quartets (in F major and in E minor) and organ music.

At the age of 43, Aulin decided to move from the capital, where she grew up, to Örebro, a city some 125 miles to the west. There Aulin began working as a teacher, organist, pianist and arranging concerts although she ceased composing. The reasons for her departure have never been determined, although the move has been viewed with much speculation. The American Scholar posits that she possibly became tired of the constant challenges she faced regarding the musical culture in Stockholm, particularly since Aulin was female, and also that she had certain difficulties with her mother. The Swedish Musical Heritage posits the same reasons. Other reasons suggested by The Swedish Art Music Society include the fact that the Aulin Quartet gradually ceased to perform as well as the early death of the composer Ludvig Norman along with other members of her support structure. This, combined with a lack of friends, may have been another reason.

Either way, Aulin's work was performed less and less, and would be forgotten. It was only in 1991 that Quartet No. 2 was given its next performance.

== Compositions ==
In addition to piano pieces and songs, Aulin composed two string quartets (F major and E minor), organ music, orchestral and choral works.

Aulin's compositions include works both for less experienced musicians and professional musicians. This is evidenced by dedications to singers such as the Swedish opera singer Dina Edling and music teacher Hilda Thegerström.

With the exception of Grande sonate sérieuse pour le piano [F minor], Sonata for piano opus 14, the piano compositions have a single movement. These compositions are mood pieces in which the title already defines the pieces character. The prominence of single movement works is puzzling as Aulin was an accomplished pianist and was more than capable of playing longer compositions. Swedish Musical Heritage has posited that the possible reason was that Aulin wanted more of her work published as smaller works selling better than larger works.

Aulin's compositions for solo voice and piano tend to be artistic songs rather than romances. Most of the text that is attached to the compositions is taken from poems written by Karl Alfred Melin. It is unknown whether Melin was a poet as he is entirely unknown. The other pieces of text were principally written by the composer Ludvig Norman. Other people of interest were the Swedish poet Carl David af Wirsén and the Finnish-Swedish lyricist and poet Johan Ludvig Runeberg.

Aulin's works with most lasting effects, and which are considered the most important of the genre from the 1880's, are the two string quartets. Aulin wrote the second quartet when she was 29 years old and it has often puzzled musical historians and biographers of Aulin's life why she did not return to writing quartets in later life. Both quartets were premiered by her brother's quartet, the Aulin String Quartet, to positive reviews.

=== Orchestral works in several movements ===
- Tableaux Parisiens, orchestral suite op. 15, 1886

=== Mixed choir a cappella ===
- Three songs for mixed choir a cappella opus 5
- Two choirs a cappella for mixed voices opus 24

=== Mixed choir and instruments ===
- Christmas song for mixed choir and organ accompaniment opus 23

=== Mixed choir and orchestra ===
- Pie Jesu Domine, Missa sollemnis opus 13
- Veni sanctu spiritus [sic], hymn (Veni sancte spiritus) opus 32

=== Mixed choir with solo voice(s) and orchestra ===
- Herr Olof ('På ängen under det mörka fjället', Carl David af Wirsén), ballad for tenor solo, choir and orchestra op. 3, 1880
- Procul este ('Gå stum, ja stum', Carl David af Wirsén), lyrical poem for soprano solo, choir, orchestra and harp op. 28, 1886

=== Female choir and instruments ===
- Three choirs for female voices with piano accompaniment

=== Voice and piano ===
- Carina, 1891
- Der Todtengräber [for bass voice and piano]
- Det finns en gosse och han är min, 1884
- Four songs from Heine's 'Buch der Lieder' opus 9
- För länge se'n
- Kom!, 1881
- Roddaren, 1881
- Saknaden, 1886
- Skärgårdsvisa
- Säg ej så,
- Two songs for one voice and piano opus 19,
- Vid Rånö ström opus 18, 1890
- Ynglingen, 1881

==== Uncategorised works ====
- Borta. Gone
- Der Totengräber ('Ich grabe'). For bass and piano.
- Där kärlek i hjertat bott en gång. Where love in Hjertat lived once
- Hvad du sörjer öfver och är så blek. What you mourn upon and are so pale
- O! du sommartid. (O! Summer Time)
- Saknaden ('I skogen finns ej mer en gren', Johan Ludvig Runeberg). Missing, (There is no more branch in the forest)
- Vid Rånö ström ('Midsommarnatten drog som ett flor öfver mark och ängar', Karl Alfred Melin) op. 18. (Midsummer Night pulled like a flor upon land and meadows)
- Skärgårdsvisa ('När solen sjunker i eld och lågor', Karl Alfred Melin), 1892. For a long time now (When the sun drops in fire and flames)
- Säg ej så (Thomas Moore) (Do not say so)
- Var det en dröm? (Karl Alfred Melin). (Was it a dream?)
- Vårsång (Spring Song).
- För länge se´n ('Den gamla, gamla visan', Karl Alfred Melin), latest 1896. For a long time now (The old, old show)
- Four song from Heine's Buch der Lieder for voice and piano, dedicated to Charlotte Asplund (née Senmark) op. 9.
  - 1. Deine weissen Lilienfinger ('Dina liljehvita fingrar'). Your white lily fingers. (Your lily-white fingers)
  - 2. Es fällt ein Stern herunter ('En tindrande stjärna faller'), also separate for bass and piano. A star drops down (A twinkling star falls)
  - 3. Ich stand in dunklen Träumen ('Jag stod försänkt i drömmar'), also separate for bass and piano. I stood in dark dreams (I was immersed in dreams)
  - 4. Der Mond ist aufgegangen ('Fullmånen sin strålflod gjuter') The full moons rays found me (The moon has risen)
- Vaggsång, dedicated to Fritz Arlberg op. 10 (Josef Julius Wecksell). Lullaby

=== Violin and piano ===
- Album leaf 1989
- Elegie opus 8 no. 3 1880-1890
- Sonata for piano and violin [G minor]

==== Uncategorised work ====
- Ballad and Noveletta.
- Albumblad, originally for piano. Transcription by the composer.

=== Piano ===
ValvorgAulin SonataForPiano op14 Esmuc

- 5 Tone poems for piano opus 7 1882
- 7 pieces for piano opus 8 1884
- Album leaf (Feuille d'album) opus 29 1898
- Grande sonate sérieuse pour le piano [F minor], Sonata for piano opus 14 1885
- Miniature
- Suite for piano [D minor]
- Three fantasy pieces for piano opus 30 1898
- Valse élégiaque 1892?

=== Organ ===
- Meditation

=== String Quartet ===
- Qvartett [F major] (1884)
- String quartet in E minor opus 17 (1889)

=== Other works for strings ===
- Var det en dröm?, originally for song and piano. Arrangement for strings with obligato violin. Was it a dream?
