= Wilhelm Stenhammar =

Swedish musician

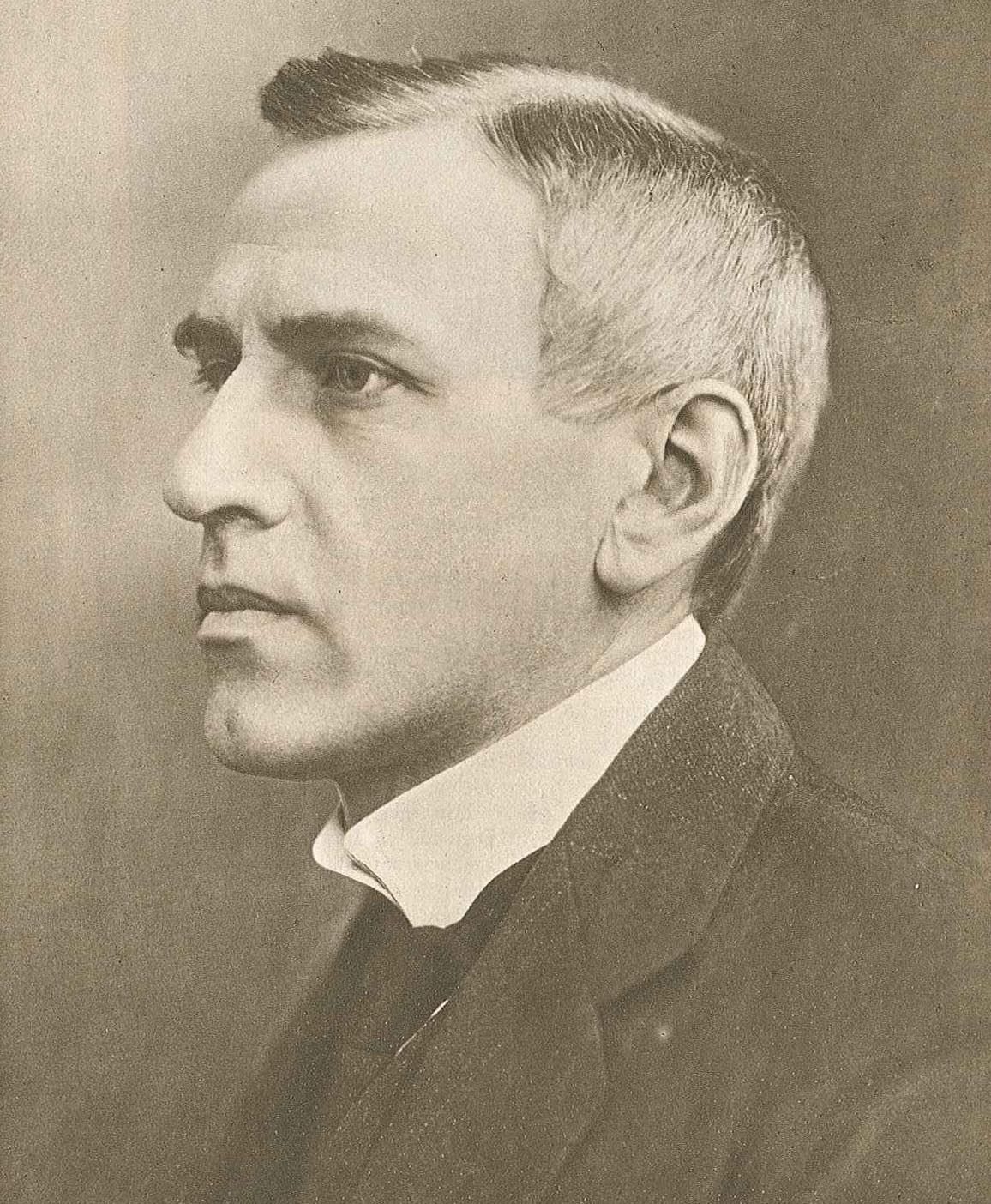
Wilhelm Stenhammar, c. 1916

Carl Wilhelm Eugen Stenhammar (February 7, 1871 – November 20, 1927) was a Swedish composer, conductor and pianist. He is considered to be one of Sweden's most important composers at the turn of the 20th century, and one of the finest Swedish pianists of his time, with a reputation as a fine interpreter of the piano music of Beethoven.

== Biography ==
Wilhelm Stenhammar was born in Stockholm to Per Ulrik Stenhammar and Louise Rudenschöld. His older brother was the architect Ernst Stenhammar. He demonstrated a talent for music at an early age, both as pianist and composer, writing piano sonatas and songs during his teenage years. He received his first musical education in Stockholm, where his teachers included Emil Sjögren and Andreas Hallén. In the autumn of 1892, he moved to Berlin for seven months to study with Karl Heinrich Barth, where he devoted his time to rigorous piano practice and composition. Barth was satisfied with Stenhammar's progress and gave him increasingly technically challenging pieces to practice, such as the Variations on a Theme of Paganini by Johannes Brahms, a composer he admired.

Stenhammar's breakthrough as both composer and pianist came with the premiere of his Piano Concerto no. 1 in B minor, Op. 1, in Stockholm on 17 March 1894, with the composer himself as soloist. The music scholar Bo Wallner has described this concert as a milestone in Swedish music history. The resultant critical acclaim led to invitations for concert performances in Denmark, England and Germany, effectively launching Stenhammar's career as an internationally renowned concert pianist. He subsequently recorded five piano rolls for Welte-Mignon on 21 September 1905.

As a composer, Stenhammar was initially influenced by German and Austrian music, especially that of Richard Wagner and Anton Bruckner. Stenhammar himself described the style of his First Symphony in F major as "idyllic Bruckner". He subsequently sought to liberate himself from this influence, with the goal of writing in a more "Nordic" style, looking to Carl Nielsen and Jean Sibelius for guidance. The latter's Symphony No. 2, especially, had a great effect on him, leading him to change his style and withdraw his own First Symphony from performance. Having attended the Swedish premiere of Sibelius's Symphony No. 2 in Stockholm, Stenhammar wrote to him:

You should know that you are in my thoughts daily ever since I heard the symphony. You magnificent person, it is of course a huge armful of wonder that you brought up out of the unconscious and ineffable depth. That which I felt has been verified: You are in this moment for me as the foremost, the only, the enigmatic one.... I have also just written a symphony. At least it is called a symphony, and only in accordance with the understanding that you perhaps have forgotten should it be dedicated to you. However, nothing came of it. It is quite good, but somewhat superficial. I yearn to reach my inner self. And you can wait until I have arrived there. The great day when this happens, I will print your name in large letters on the title page. It may become a symphony or something else.

A result of his search for a new style was Stenhammar's own Second Symphony in G minor, composed nearly twelve years after the First Symphony, which shows the influence of Nielsen, Sibelius and Franz Berwald among others.

From 1906 to 1922 Stenhammar was artistic director and chief conductor of the Gothenburg Symphony Orchestra, the first full-time professional orchestra in Sweden. In this capacity, he organized many performances of music by contemporary Scandinavian composers. In 1909, he briefly held the position of director of music at Uppsala University, where he was succeeded the following year by Hugo Alfvén. After moving back to Stockholm in the early 1920s, he returned to touring despite his declining health.

Wilhelm Stenhammar died of a stroke at 56 years of age in Jonsered in the historic province of Västergötland. He is buried in Gothenburg. He had two children with his wife Helga Stenhammar, Claes Göran Stenhammar and Hillevi Stenhammar, both of whom were singers.

== Works ==
Stenhammar composed in a variety of formats, his output by no means limited to his own instrument, the piano. The list includes two completed symphonies, a substantial Serenade for orchestra, two piano concertos, four piano sonatas, a violin sonata, seven string quartets (one of which was withdrawn), two operas, many songs and a number of other vocal works, including several large-scale works for chorus or voices and orchestra. The latter include the early ballad Florez och Blanzeflor, Op. 3, from 1891, Ithaka, Op. 21, from 1904, and the cantatas Ett folk (A people) from 1905 and Sången (The song), Op. 44, from 1921. The catalog has been extended in recent years with the discovery of a few previously unknown works. These include the Prélude and Bourrée for orchestra, composed in 1891: the score was discovered in the archives of the Swedish Music Library in Stockholm, and the first recording (and most likely first performance) took place in 2008. Also in 2008, the Swedish Art Music Society published the world premiere edition of the Allegro Brillante for piano quartet composed in 1891 and the Allegro non tanto for piano trio composed in 1895.

Stenhammar's string quartets were composed over a 22-year period from 1894 to 1916. Seven such works were completed; however, one of them (in F minor, 1897) was withdrawn by the composer immediately after its first performance, although it has since been revived and recorded. Writing in The Chamber Music Journal, Raymond Silvertrust argues that Stenhammar's cycle of six (numbered) quartets is the most important to be written between those of Johannes Brahms and Béla Bartók. Silvertrust notes that, tonally, they range from the middle-late Romantics to a style akin to mature Sibelius, exhibiting a fine grasp of instrumental timbre and technique, with part writing that is idiomatic and appropriate to the instruments. Stenhammar's interest in chamber music, and his skill as a composer in this genre, may have been influenced by his partnership with the Aulin Quartet, the leading Swedish string quartet of his day and one of the best then performing in Europe. Stenhammar worked closely and toured extensively throughout Europe with this quartet for many years, with a piano quintet typically featured in their programs. Stenhammar would also partner with Tor Aulin, first violinist of the eponymous quartet, to perform sonatas for violin and piano. Though not unknown by the Swedish chamber music public, Stenhammar's string quartets have tended to be neglected elsewhere.

=== List of compositions ===
==== Opera ====
- The Feast at Solhaug (Gillet på Solhaug), opera in three acts for soloists, mixed chorus, and orchestra; libretto by Henrik Ibsen (Op. 6; 1892–1896)
- Tirfing, "Norse mythological music drama" in two acts (plus a prelude and postlude) for soloists, mixed chorus, female chorus, and orchestra; libretto by Anna Boberg (1897–1898)

==== Symphonies ====
- Symphony No. 1 in F major, for orchestra (1902–1903, withdrawn)
- Symphony No. 2 in G minor, for orchestra (Op. 34, 1911–1915)
- Symphony No. 3 in C major (1918–1919, fragmentary)

==== Concertanta ====
- Piano Concerto No. 1 in B♭ minor, for piano and orchestra (Op. 1; 1893)
- Piano Concerto No. 2 in D minor, for piano and orchestra (Op. 23; 1904–1907)
- Two Sentimental Romances, for violin and orchestra (Op. 28; 1910)

==== Other orchestral works ====
- Excelsior!, concert overture for orchestra (Op. 13; 1896)
- Serenade in F major, for orchestra (Op. 31; 1908–1913, rev. 1919)

==== Vocal works ====
- Florez and Blanzeflor (Florez och Blanzeflor), ballad for baritone and orchestra; text by Oscar Levertin (Op. 3; 1891)
- Snöfrid, for soprano, mezzo-soprano, tenor, mixed chorus, and orchestra; text by Viktor Rydberg (Op. 5; 1891)
- Ithaca (Ithaka), ballad for baritone and orchestra; text by Oscar Levertin (Op. 21; 1904)
- One People (Ett Folk), cantata for baritone, mixed chorus, and orchestra; text by Verner von Heidenstam (Op. 22; 1904–1905)
- Midwinter (Midvinter), rhapsody for mixed chorus and orchestra (Op. 24; 1907)
- The Song (Sången), symphonic cantata for soprano, contralto, tenor, baritone, mixed chorus, children's chorus, and orchestra (Op. 44; 1921)
- Around 60 songs

==== Chamber music ====
- Allegro brillante in E♭ major, for piano quartet (1891)
- String Quartet No. 1 in C major, Op. 2 (1894)
- Allegro ma non tanto in A major, for piano trio (1895)
- String Quartet No. 2 in C minor (Op. 14; 1896)
- String Quartet in F minor (1897; Withdrawn)
- String Quartet No. 3 in F major (Op. 18; 1897–1900)
- Violin Sonata in A minor, for violin and piano (Op. 19; 1899–1900)
- String Quartet No. 4 in A minor (Op. 25; 1904–1909)
- String Quartet No. 5 in C major (Op. 29; 1910)
- String Quartet No. 6 in D minor (Op. 35; 1916)

==== Piano music ====
- Piano Sonata No. 1 in C major (1880)
- Piano Sonata No. 2 in C minor (1881)
- Piano Sonata No. 3 in A♭ major (1885)
- Piano Sonata No. 4 in G minor (1890)
- Three Fantasies (Op. 11; 1895)
- Piano Sonata in A♭ major (Op. 12; 1895)
- Late Summer (Sensommarnätter), five piano pieces (Op. 33; 1914)

==== Stage ====
- A Dream Play (Ett drömspel), a drama by August Strindberg (1916)
- Lodolezzi Sings (Lodolezzi sjunger), a drama by Hjalmar Bergman; directed by Per Lindberg, Op. 39 (1919)
- As You Like It (Som ni behagar), a drama by William Shakespeare; directed by Lindberg (1920)
- Hamlet, a drama by Shakespeare; directed by Lindberg (1920)
- Turandot, incidental music for chamber ensemble to a drama by Carlo Gozzi; directed by Lindberg (Op. 42; 1920)
- Chitra, a drama by Rabindranath Tagore; directed by Lindberg (1921)
- Romeo and Juliet, a drama by Shakespeare; directed by Lindberg (1922)
