= Gillet på Solhaug =

Opera by Wilhelm Stenhammar

Gillet pa Solhaug is an 1893 Swedish-language opera in 3 acts by Wilhelm Stenhammar to a libretto based on The Feast at Solhaug (Norwegian Gildet paa Solhoug) by Henrik Ibsen. The opera was completed in 1893, and premiered at the Hoftheater Stuttgart in 1899, then in Sweden at the Royal Swedish Opera in 1902.

== Recordings ==
- Per-Hakan Precht (tenor), Karolina Andersson (soprano), Matilda Paulsson (mezzo-soprano), Fredrik Zetterstrom (baritone), Erik Lundh (baritone), Mathias Zachariassen (tenor), Anton Ljungqvist (bass-baritone), Symphony Orchestra of Norrköping, Conducted Henrik Schaefer. recorded in August 2015 Sterling 2016
