= Violin Concerto (Wirén) =

Concerto in three movements by Dag Wirén

- by Dag Wirén
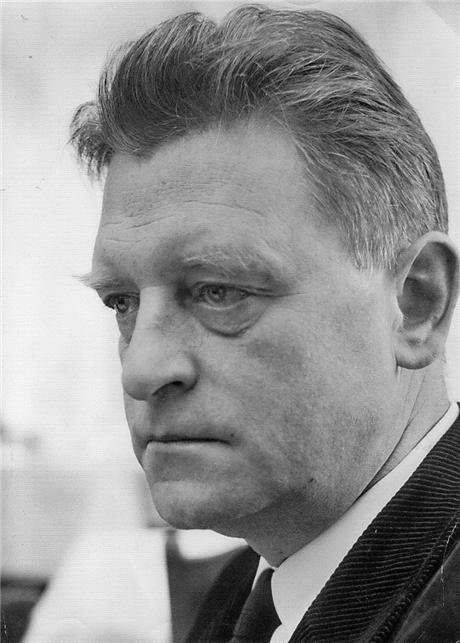
- The composer
- Opus: 23
- Composed: 1945–1946
- Publisher: Gehrmans Musikförlag (1948)
- Duration: Approx. 20 minutes
- Movements: 3

Premiere
- Date: 10 April 1947
- Location: Gothenburg, Sweden
- Conductor: Clarence Raybould
- Performers: Gothenburg Orchestral Society; Otto Kyndel

The Violin Concerto, Op. 23, is a three-movement concertante composition for violin and orchestra written from 1945 to 1946 by the Swedish composer Dag Wirén. The piece premiered on 10 April 1947 in Gothenburg, Sweden, with Clarence Raybould conducting the Gothenburg Orchestral Society; the soloist was the Swedish violinist Otto Kyndel. The Violin Concerto is a rare example of Wirén—the idiom of whom was primarily neo-classical—embracing a "full-blooded" neo-romantic style; it is, with its "greater depth of expression, ... in the spirit of" Jean Sibelius. In a 1979 radio interview, Wirén characterized the Violin Concerto as one of the best pieces he had composed

== Structure ==
The Violin Concerto is in three movements. They are as follows:

1. Allegro moderato, ma inquieto
2. Andante espressivo
3. Allegro molto

== Instrumentation ==
The Violin Concerto is scored the following instruments:

- Soloist: violin
- Woodwinds: 2 flutes, 2 oboes, 2 clarinets (in ??), and 2 bassoons
- Brass: 4 horns (in ??), 2 trumpets (in ??), 3 trombones, and tuba
- Percussion: timpani + other percussion
- Strings: violins, violas, cellos, double basses, and harp

Gehrmans Musikförlag published the piece in 1948.

== Recordings ==
The sortable table below lists commercially available recordings of the Violin Concerto:

| Conductor | Orchestra | Soloist | Rec. (Note: Refers to the year in which the performers recorded the work; this may not be the same as the year in which the recording was first released to the general public.) | Time | Recording venue | Label | Ref. |
|---|---|---|---|---|---|---|---|
| Sten Frykberg | Swedish Radio Orchestra | Louis Kaufman | 1953 | 18:27 | Swedish Radio | Discopaedia | (Note: S. Frykberg– Discopaedia (MB 1027) 1960) |
| Sergiu Comissiona | Stockholm Philharmonic Orchestra | Nils-Erik Sparf | 1985 | 20:30 | Stockholm Concert Hall | Caprice | (Note: S. Comissiona–Caprice (CAP 21326) 1990) |

== Notes, references, and sources ==
Notes

Sources

- "Violinkonsert" [Violin Concerto]. gehrmans.se. Gehrmans Musikförlag.
- Hedblad, Lars (1990). Dag Wirén: Violin Concerto / Triptych / Wind Quintet, Op. 42 / String Quartet No. 5, Op. 41 (CD booklet). Translated by Tanner, Roger. Sergiu Commissiona & Stockholm Philharmonic Orchestra. Caprice. p. 2–4. CAP 21326. OCLC 28299747
- Kaufman, Louis (1960). Masters of the Bow: The Kaufman Legacy (Vol. 1) (LP booklet). Sten Frykberg & Swedish Radio Orchestra. Discopaedia. MB 1027. OCLC 18337179
