= Symphony No. 3 (Wirén) =

Symphony in three movements by Dag Wirén

- by Dag Wirén
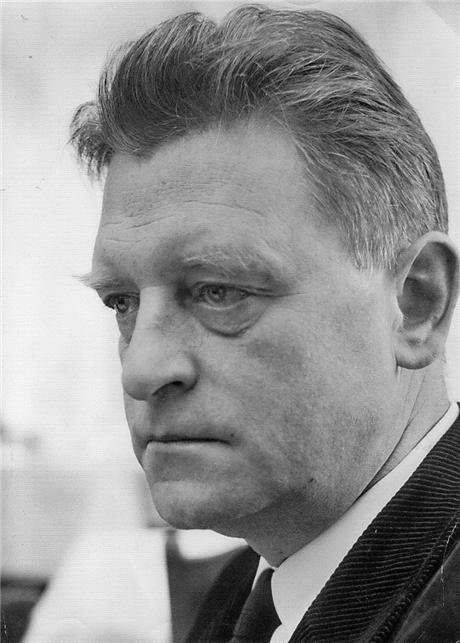
- The composer, c. 1940s
- Opus: 20
- Composed: 1943–1944
- Dedication: The composer's parents
- Publisher: Gehrmans Musikförlag (1946)
- Duration: Approx. 23 minutes
- Movements: 3

Premiere
- Date: 28 September 1944
- Location: Gothenburg, Sweden
- Conductor: Sixten Eckerberg
- Performers: Gothenburg Symphony Orchestra

The Symphony No. 3, Op. 20, is a three-movement orchestral composition written from 1943 to 1944 by the Swedish composer Dag Wirén. Despite its numbering, the Third Symphony represents Wirén's second contribution to the form as a professional (the composer withdrew Symphony No. 1, Op. 3—a 1932 experimental "study work" from his student years in Paris—and prohibited its performance), arriving five years after its predecessor, the Symphony No. 2. Swedish conductor Sixten Eckerberg premiered the new symphony with the Gothenburg Symphony Orchestra in Gothenburg on 28 September 1944.

== Structure ==
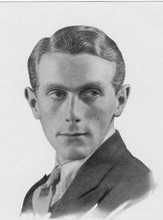
Sixten Eckerberg (c. 1935), who premiered the Third Symphony in 1944.

The Third Symphony is in three movements. They are as follows:

1. Allegro [attacca subito]
2. Adagio
3. Allegro molto — Poco più moto — Tempo I — Prestissimo — Poco meno

A transparency score is archived at The Music and Theatre Library of Sweden.

== Orchestration ==
- Woodwind: 2 flutes, 2 oboes, 2 clarinets, 2 bassoons
- Brass: 4 horns, 2 trumpets, 3 trombones, tuba
- Percussion: timpani
- Strings: violins, violas, cellos, double basses

== Recordings ==
Conductor	Orchestra	Recorded	Duration	Label
Thomas Dausgaard	Norrköping Symphony Orchestra	1999	22:12	cpo (999677-2)
Rumon Gamba	Iceland Symphony Orchestra	2018	24:43	Chandos (CHSA5194)
Stefan Solyom	Sami Sinfonietta	2001	25:37	Phono Suecia (PS-CD716)

The Dausgaard recording has received generally positive reviews. ClassicsToday.com's David Hurwitz, for example, describes the Third as "portraying the eventual triumph of its song-like, rhapsodic elements over its more active, aggressive ones". Furthermore, he detects in the Third Symphony (and its disc partner, the Symphony No. 2) echoes of Jean Sibelius and Carl Nielsen, concluding: "Not a bad combination! In fact, Wirén's symphonic achievement rubs shoulders easily with the 20th century's finest works in the form". Fanfare's Paul Snook describes the Third as representative of "this patient, self-critical composer's evolution toward a singular and personalized type of Neo-Classical minimalism, where every detail counts"; he further labels the disc "a welcome and necessary addition to the Swedish recorded repertoire" that "points to the mature Wirén". The American Record Guide's Mark Lehman praises the "splendid" Symphonies Nos. 2 and 3 as "overflow[ing] with an untroubled but mysterious joy", noting in particular their "pantheistic expansiveness and dewy-fresh orchestral transparency".

== References and sources ==
=== Sources ===
CD liner notes

- Jacobsson, Stig (2000). Dag Wiren: Symphonies Nos. 2 and 3, Concert Overtures (booklet). Thomas Dausgaard & Norrköping Symphony Orchestra. Germany: cpo. p. 17–27. 999677-2.

Websites

- Åhlén, Carl-Gunnar (n.d.). "List of works and discography". dagwiren.se (The Dag Wirén Foundation).
- Gehrmans Musikförlag (n.d.). "Symfoni Nr. 3 (Symphony No. 3)". gehrmans.se.

Music criticism

- Hurwitz, David (2018). "Major Discoveries: Wirén Symphonies Nos. 2 and 3". ClassicsToday.com. (subscription required)
- Lehman, Mark (2000). "Wirén: Symphonies 2+3; Overtures 1+2". American Record Guide. 63 (6): 252. (subscription required)
- Snook, Paul (2000). "Wirén Symphonies: No. 2; No. 3. Concert Overtures: No. 1; No. 2". Fanfare Magazine. 24 (1): 312–13. (subscription required)
