= Swedish Art Music Society =

The Swedish Art Music Society (Musikaliska konstföreningen) is a non-profit organisation with the aim of publishing Swedish art music. It was founded by Swedish composers in 1859 to facilitate the publishing of Swedish art music, then largely controlled by German publishers.

Each year, one or a couple of pieces of music are selected for publication. Composers include Stenhammar, Röntgen-Maier, Alfvén, Olsson, de Frumerie, Wirén, Carlstedt and Welin. Often, contemporary music is chosen, but sometimes the organisation elects to publish older masterpieces which have remained unpublished, such as the recent publication of the symphonies by the Swedish 18th-century composer Eggert.
