= Tor Aulin =

Swedish violinist, conductor and composer

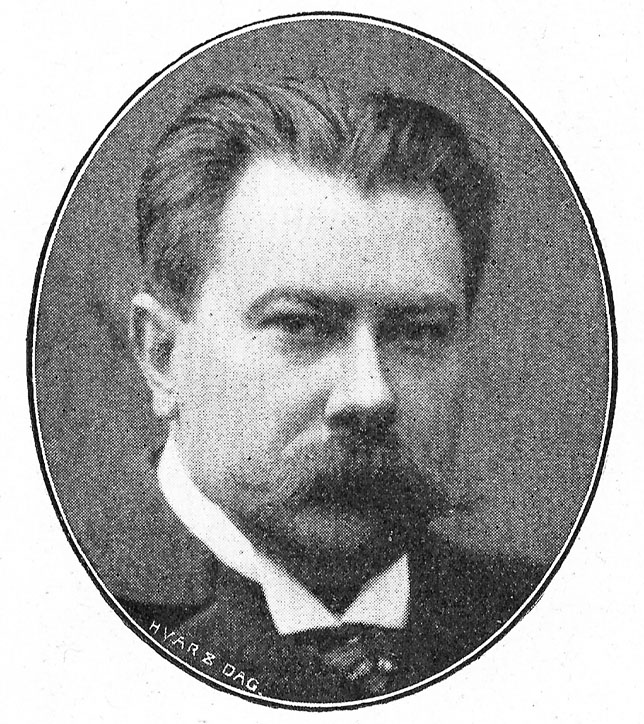

Background information
- Born: 10 September 1866; Stockholm, Sweden
- Died: 1 March 1914 (aged 47) Saltsjöbaden, Sweden
- Genres: Orchestral; chamber
- Occupations: Violinist; conductor; composer
- Instrument: Violin

Tor Aulin (10 September 1866 – 1 March 1914) was a Swedish violinist and a conductor and a composer.

== Biography ==
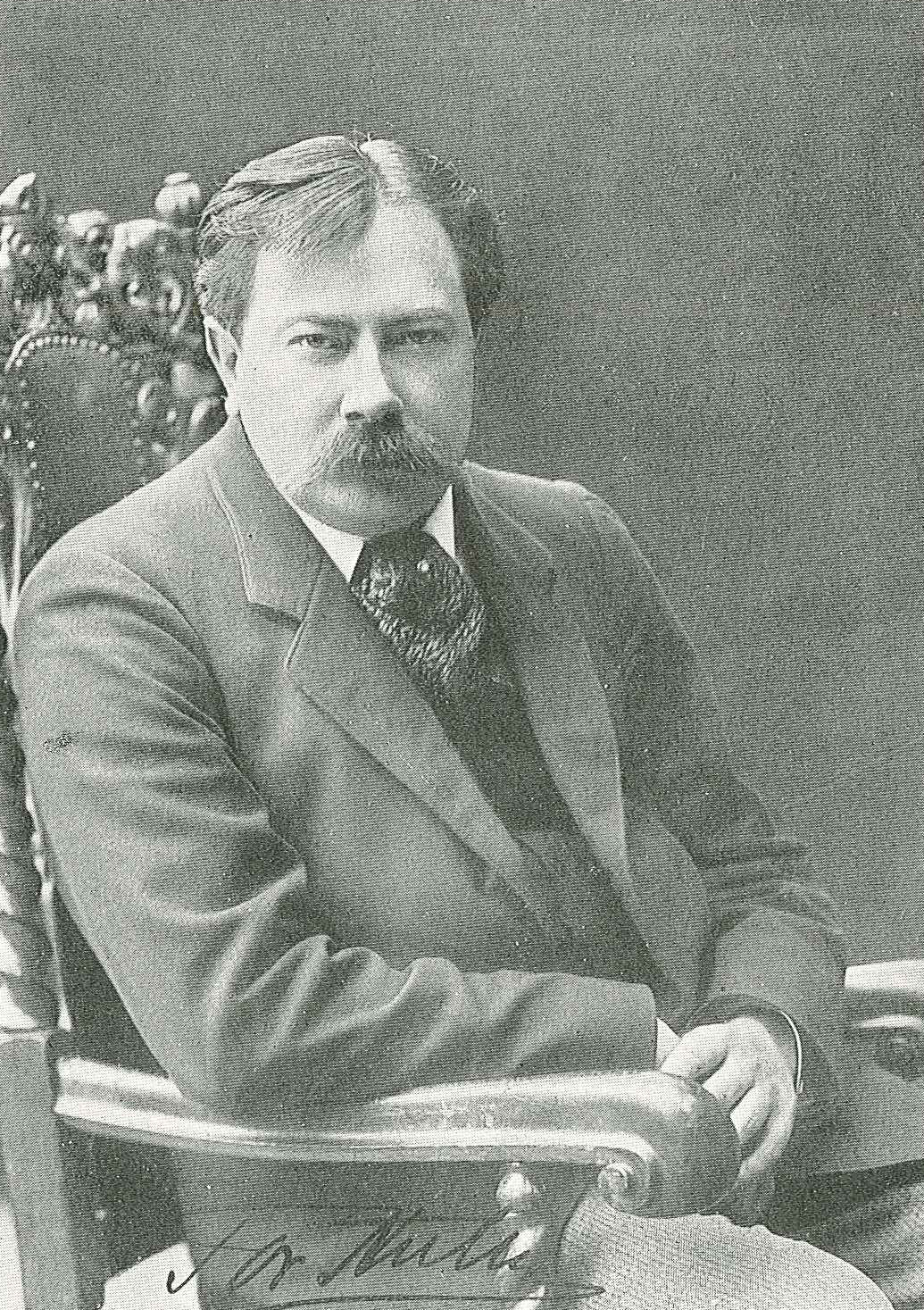
Tor Aulin

Aulin studied music at the Royal College of Music in Stockholm (1877-1883) under Carl Johan Lindberg and then in the Conservatory of Berlin (1884-1886) with Émile Sauret and Philipp Scharwenka. From 1889 to 1892 Aulin served as concertmaster of the Royal Swedish Opera in Stockholm. He went on to conduct the principal symphony orchestras of Stockholm and Gothenburg. In 1887 he formed the Aulin Quartet, the first full-time professional quartet in Sweden. It gained an excellent reputation. It disbanded in 1912. Along with Wilhelm Stenhammar, Aulin spearheaded a revival in interest in the work of Franz Berwald, and as soloist he premiered some of Stenhammar's works for violin and orchestra.

Aulin composed a number of orchestral and chamber music works, including a violin sonata, three violin concertos, an orchestral suite, and many small pieces for the violin.

His sister, Laura Valborg Aulin, was a pianist and composer whose output included two string quartets, in F major and E minor, among other works.

== List of compositions ==
=== With opus number ===
- Violin Concerto Nº. 2, in A minor, Opus 11 (exists in two versions)
- Violin Concerto Nº. 3, Opus 14
- 4 Aqvareller, Opus 15
- 4 Pieces for Violin & Piano, Opus 16
- Midsummer Dance for Violin & Piano, Opus 18
- Lyric Poem for Violin & Piano, Opus 21
- Master Olof, Opus 22 (1908)
- Gotländska danser, Opus 23
- Swedish Dances for Violin & Piano, Opus 30
- 4 Schwedische Tänze, Opus 32

=== Without opus number ===
- Albumblatt
- Little Suite for Violin and Piano
- Polka characteristique
- 4 Serbian Folksongs
- Wiegenlied
