= Chamber Music Journal =

The Chamber Music Journal is a periodical devoted exclusively to non-standard, rare or unknown chamber music of merit. (i.e., not Beethoven, Mozart, Brahms etc.) Between 1990 and 2010, it was published in hardcopy and available by subscription only. Since 2011, it has been exclusively published online. All issues, past and current, are available at no cost. It is under the general editorship of R.H.R. Silvertrust.

The Chamber Music Journal is considered one of the leading chamber music reference sources in English. It features articles with hard-to-find information that often has been published nowhere else, an example being a 13-part series on the 36 string quartets of the important 19th-century French composer George Onslow. The chamber music of Borodin, Respighi, Saint-Saëns, the piano trios of Richard Strauss, the chamber music of the Terezin Composers, Joseph Rheinberger, Eric Zeisl, Max Bruch, Willem Pijper, Zdenek Fibich, Glazunov, Edmund Rubbra, Luigi Cherubini, Wilhelm Stenhammar are among the subjects which appeared in past issues.
