= Dag Wirén =

Swedish composer (1905–1986)

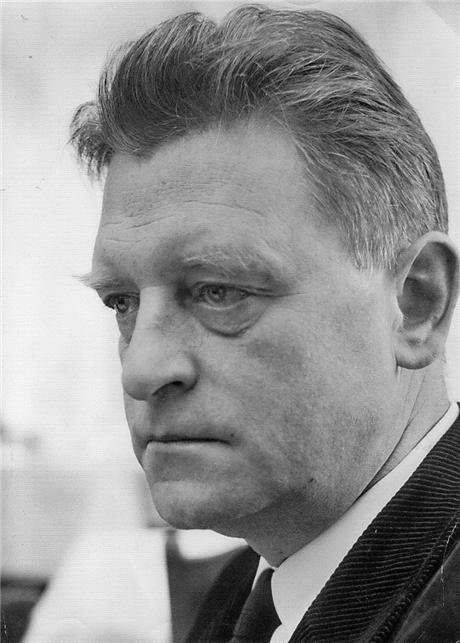
Wirén, c. 1960

Dag Ivar Wirén (15 October 1905 – 19 April 1986) was a Swedish composer. Best known for his Serenade for Strings (1937), his career was mainly spent in Stockholm, aside from a stint in Paris during his early studies.

== Life and career ==
Wirén was born at Striberg near Nora on 15 October 1905. His father had a roller blind factory, and there were various musical activities in the family home; he took piano lessons, and was a student at the Karolinska school in Örebro, and played the bass drum and celesta in the town orchestra.

Wirén studied at the Stockholm conservatory from 1926 to 1931, which gave him much exposure to music from all periods; hearing Arthur Honegger's oratorio King David in 1927 was an important experience.

In 1932 he won the state stipend and used the award money to continue his studies in Paris, where he lived from 1931 to 1934. While there, he studied composition under the Russian composer Leonid Sabaneyev, though he said later that his constant attendance of concerts had a greater impact on his work. In Paris he met Igor Stravinsky (as well as his compatriot Gösta Nystroem) and was exposed to the music of Stravinsky, Sergei Prokofiev and the French composers of Les Six.

In 1934, Wirén moved to Stockholm with his bride, the Irish cellist, Noel Franks, whom he had met in Paris; their daughter, Annika, was born in 1947. In 1937, the couple set up home permanently in Danderyd, just north of Stockholm. As well as composing, Wirén regularly played his main instrument, the piano, on Swedish Radio during the 1930s; he also devoted himself to chamber music in the 1930s and 40s; although he conducted in a recording of his Sinfonietta, he hated conducting. He was music critic at the "Svenska Morgonbladet" from 1938 to 1946, and in 1947 became vice-chairman of the Society of Swedish Composers. From 1948, he spent summers on the island of Björkö, in Stockholm's archipelago. He served as a member of the board of directors of the Royal Swedish Opera from 1962 to 1971. His TV ballet Den elaka drottningen (The Evil Queen) won the 1960 Prix Italia. He also wrote the music for the Swedish entry for the 1965 Eurovision Song Contest, Annorstädes vals (Absent Friend), sung by Ingvar Wixell. He retired from composing in 1970, commenting, "One should stop in time, while one still has time to stop in time."

He died at Danderyd on 19 April 1986.

== Music ==
Wirén's output, which ranges from serious to popular, is notable for its quality rather than quantity, and he refused to assign opus numbers to a number of his works and withdrew others. He once commented that his first desire was to entertain and please, and compose listener-friendly "modern" music. He was reluctant to write for the voice (in the 1965 Eurovision Song Contest entry, Alf Henrikson wrote the lyrics after Wirén had composed the music).

Neoclassical pieces from Wirén's early Parisian period, including the Piano Trio (1933) and the Sinfonietta (1933–34), are melodically and rhythmically entertaining.

Upon his return to Sweden, he composed his first two symphonies and his most famous work, the Serenade for Strings (1937); the spirit of this serenade may also be found in the finale of his second symphony (1939). Wirén went on to compose five symphonies, concertos and other orchestral works, including music for the stage and film scores, as well as instrumental and chamber music, including a series of string quartets.

His musical style on return from Paris remained broadly neoclassical; melodic, energetic and with high spirits. Towards the mid-1940s Wirén became more serious in style, perhaps under the influence of Jean Sibelius. Wirén also developed a personal technique, first used in the third string quartet (1941–45), of gradual motivic transformation, avoiding repetition (metamorphosis technique). He pursued this approach in his third symphony (1944), where the first motif in the first movement, based on a step-wise Dorian mode progression, is transformed during the movement and then echoed in the last three movements. Motivic tautness also characterizes the deeply expressive fourth symphony (1952), as well as his rather cooler later works, including the fifth symphony (1964) and fifth string quartet (1970).

== Works ==
See List of compositions by Dag Wirén for a complete list.

=== Stage ===
- Oscarsbalen (The Oscar Ball), ballet in one act (four tableaux) (1949)
- Plats på scenen (Take Your Places on the Stage), ballet (1957)
- Den elaka drottningen / Snövit (The Evil Queen / Snow White), ballet (1960)

=== Orchestral ===
- Symphonies
  - Symphony No. 2 (1939)
  - Symphony No. 3 (1944)
  - Symphony No. 4 (1952)
  - Symphony No. 5 (1964)
- Concert Overture No. 1 (1931)
- Sinfonietta in C major (1934)
- Serenade for Strings (1937)
- Concert Overture No. 2 (1940)
- Divertimento (1957)

=== Concertante ===
- Cello Concerto (1936)
- Violin Concerto (1946)
- Piano Concerto (1950)
- Flute Concertino (1972)

== Recordings ==
As conductor Wirén recorded his Sinfonietta in May 1948 for Cupol, reissued on Phono Suecia PSCD 79, 1995.
