= Jan Risberg =

Swedish conductor

- Born: 5 April 1953 (age 73)
- Genre: classical music
- Occupations: conductor and composer
- Instruments: oboe
- Award: Grammis

Jan Risberg (born 5 April 1953) is a Swedish Grammis-awarded conductor, oboist and composer. Risberg has worked with several major orchestras including Royal Stockholm Philharmonic Orchestra, Malmö Symfoniorkester, Helsingborgs symfoniorkester, and Norrköpings Symfoniorkester. He is also the leader and conductor of the contemporary chamber ensemble Sonanza. He is one of the most prominent conductors within contemporary music in Sweden which has resulted in over 50 world premieres of pieces by composers such as Georg Riedel and Benjamin Staern.

In 2010, Risberg and Sonanza won the Grammis award in the category "best classical" album. One year later, he received Swedish Society of Composers's "interpretation-price".

As oboist, Risberg has been playing with orchestras such as Kungliga Filharmoniska Orkestern, Stockholms Blåsarsymfoniker and musicians like the Swedish guitar virtuoso Göran Söllscher. Risberg also appeared as a guest musician on Voulez-Vous, the sixth studio album by Swedish pop group ABBA.

Risberg is also conductor and teacher of the music programme at Södra Latin and Royal College of Music, Stockholm.

== Compositions ==
- Improvata
- Divertimento
- Lovsången som inte kan tystna
- Cristall
- 5 Intermezzi
- Fylgia
- Klädnaden
- Tales
- Shadows

== Pieces with world-premiere conducted by Risberg ==
=== with Sonanza ===
- Tidslinje / Henrik Strindberg
- Divertimento / Anders Nilsson
- Fantasia över ett ackord av B.A. Zimmermann / Benjamin Staern
- Rondo / Thomas Jennefelt
- Moonwalker / Mirjam Tally
- Le cimetière marin II / Đuro Živković
- In su / Martin B Svensson
- Ankh / Fredrik Hedelin
- Mad cow Donalds : kammaropera / Jonas Klingborg
- Ett porträtt = A portrait / Daniel Börtz
- Frameworks : a furore norrmannorum libera nos Domine / S Patric Simmerud
- Bilder / Henrik Strindberg
- Le cimetière marin / Đuro Živković
- Gilded splinters / Mattias Lysell
- Déja-vu – over and over again / Pär Frid
- Nattens djupa violoncell / Benjamin Staern
- Con-Sonanza / Cristian Marina
- Deklaranterna / Magnus Bunnskog
- Musik till en katedralbyggare = Music to a cathedral-builder / Thomas Jennefelt

=== With Södra Latins Chamber choir ===
- En mans väg hos en ung kvinna / Henrik Strindberg
- Faseliga drömmar / Kristofer Lundin
- The Life You Can Save / Gustav Alexandrie
- Lyte / Gustav Alexandrie
- Genom luft och brus / Benjamin Staern
- Womb / Robin Rolfhamre
- L'arm – sånger utan ord / David Lennartsson
- Go cycle / Pär Frid

=== with others ===
- People's voice : kammaropera / Malin Bång
- Springtime / Björn Sikström
- Ur en dalglaciär / Hans Höglund
- En liten ljusglimt = A small gleam of light / Hardi Kurda
- Fanfare for wind orchestra / Lennart Westman
- Den sovande staden / Georg Riedel
- A et B – Machaut reveries / Magnus Bunnskog
- Lines for Jenny / Adrian Knight
- Ethnical paraphrases / Moris Cengic
- Konsert Guitar concerto / Johannes Jansson
- S:t Sebastians blick : kammaropera / Magnus Bunnskog
- Tystnad : Kantat / Werner Wolf Glaser
- Six inter, ludes / Sven-David Sandström
- Liquidations / Martin B Svensson
