= Sound of Stockholm =

Classical music festival in Stockholm, Sweden

- Genre: Contemporary classical music
- Frequency: yearly
- Locations: Stockholm, Sweden
- Years active: 2010–present
- Participants: Kroumata, Stockholm Saxophone Quartet, Annie Gosfield, Trevor Wishart
- Website: https://soundofstockholm.se/

Sound of Stockholm is an annual Swedish festival for contemporary classical music. The festival is based in Stockholm and was initiated by the composers Henrik Strindberg and Peter Lindroth during the 50th anniversary of the chamber music society "Samtida Musik". The festival is organised by some of Sweden's most prominent institutions for contemporary music including The House of Culture, Fylkingen, Samtida Musik, Kroumata, and Stockholm Saxophone Quartet. The festival first took place in 2010, when 1,400 people attended the 21 concerts and seminars.

The festival has hosted several of the most prominent musicians, ensembles and composers from Sweden and abroad. Ensembles including Peärls Before Swïne Experience, Kroumata, Stockholm Saxophone Quartet and Sonanza have been featured as well as composers ranging from Annie Gosfield to Trevor Wishart.
