= Gotland School of Music Composition =

Music school in Visby, Sweden

Coordinates: 57.6377°N 18.2878°E

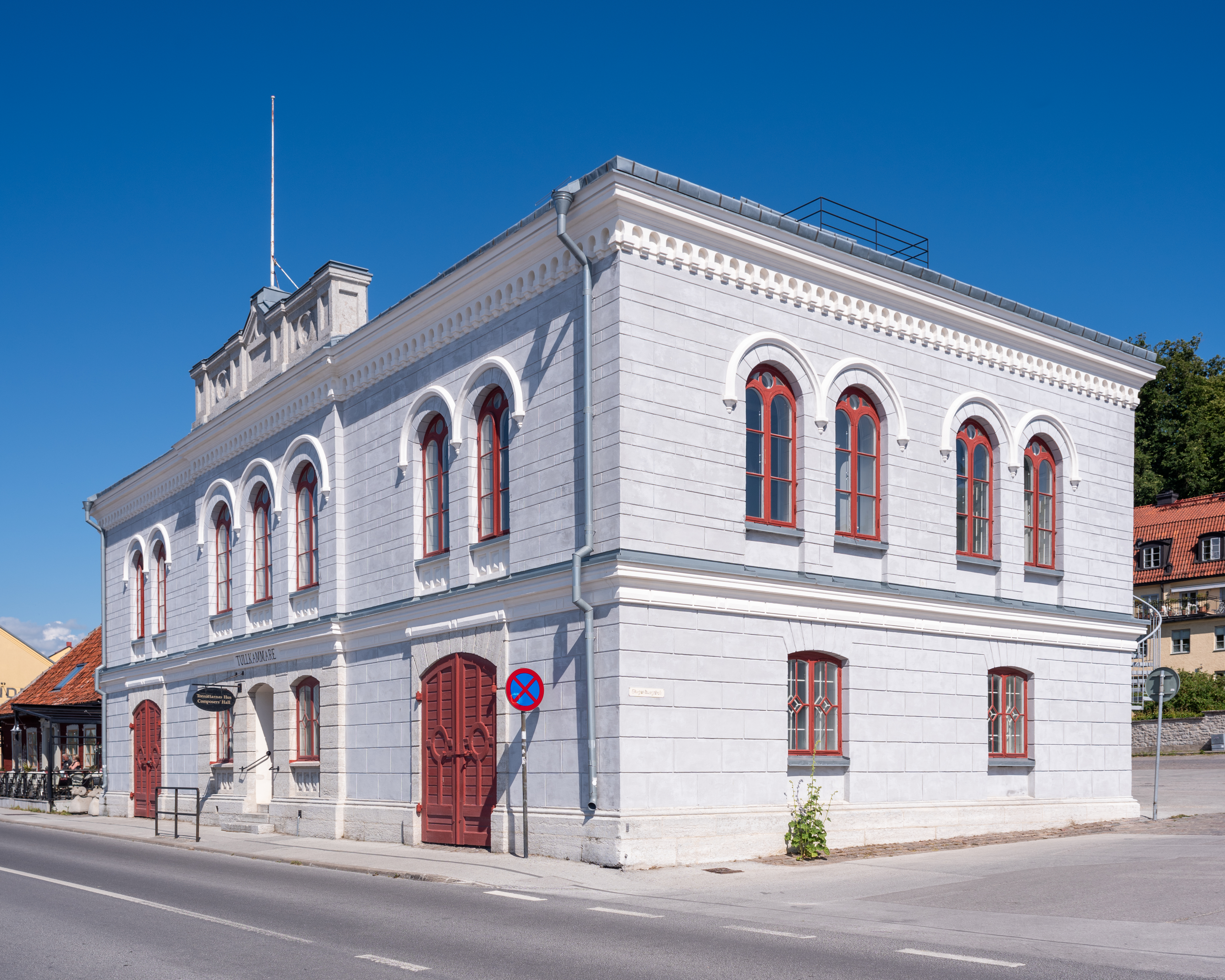
Gotland School of Music Composition in the old customs house, Visby

The Gotland School of Music Composition (sv. Gotlands tonsättarskola) is a folk high school for musical composition based in Visby, Gotland. The school offers two educational programs Course in Composition (2 years) and Composition – Contemporary (1 year).

The school endeavours to achieve a creative environment for young composers. There are pianos, a music studio for electroacoustic music and a music library. The composer Mattias Svensson Sandell is the educational leader. Composers such as Per Mårtensson and Henrik Strindberg hold seminars and individual lessons on a weekly basis. Sweden's most famous living composer Sven-David Sandström previously worked at the school.

Every year the students arrange the "Ljudvågor" music festival, during which professional musicians perform the students' music. The festival has previously featured ensembles such as Sonanza, the Swedish Radio Choir, Norrbotten NEO and the Pearls Before Swine Experience.

The school has an ongoing collaboration with the Visby International Centre for Composers (VICC).

Jan Risberg, conductor of The Sonanza Chamber Ensemble has stated that: "The Gotland School of Music Composition has been the most important event in the Swedish contemporary music scene since The Monday Group in the 1940s."

Many established young composers in Sweden have studied at the school, among them Sofia Jernberg and Tony Blomdahl.

== See also ==
- Peter van Tour

== Sources ==
- International Society for Contemporary Music (ISCM) (in English)
- Study in from the university in Lund regarding Gotland School of Music Composition (in Swedish)
- Summary of the study from the university in Lund regarding Gotland School of Music Composition (in English)
- About the creation and importance of the school (in Swedish)
