= Sofia Jernberg =

Swedish experimental singer, improviser and composer

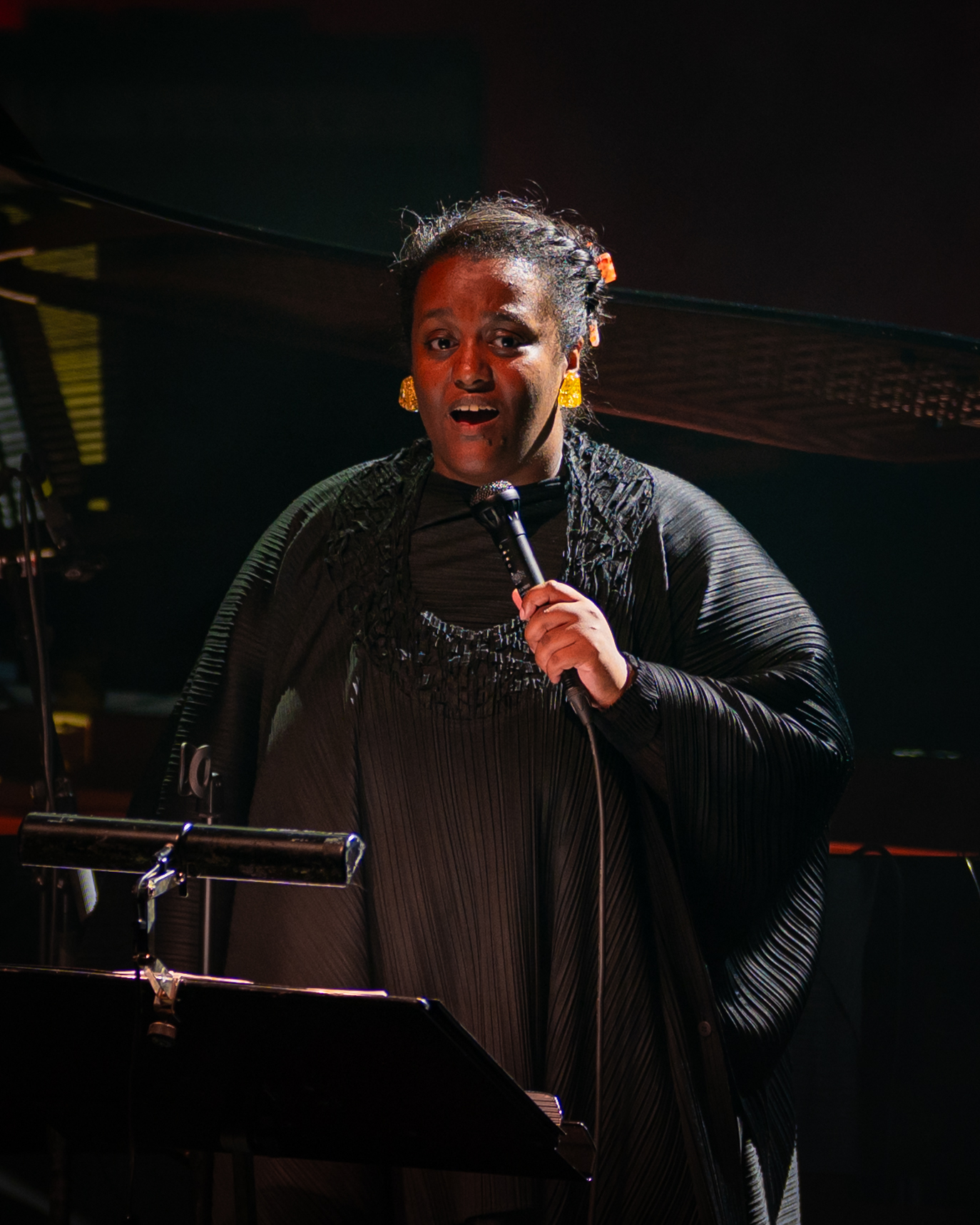
Sofia Jernberg at Punktfestivalen in 2025

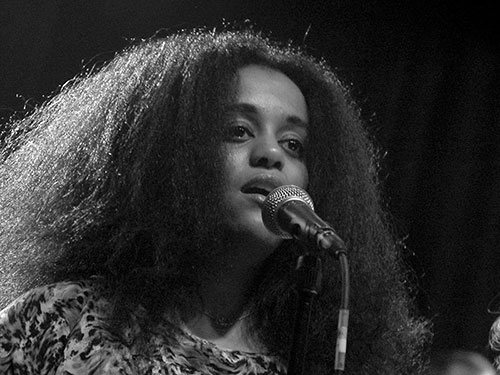
Sofia Jernberg (2014)

Sofia Jernberg (born 5 July 1983, in Ethiopia) is a Swedish experimental singer, improviser, and composer. She is widely known for expanding the "instrumental" possibilities of the voice and is active both as soloist and in various bands. Her musical partners include internationally acclaimed performers such as Peter Evans, Eve Risser, Fred Lonberg-Holm, Kim Myhr and Heiner Goebbels.

Between 2002 and 2004, Jernberg studied jazz at Fridhems Folk High School. Later she studied for Per Mårtensson and Henrik Strindberg at The Gotland School of Music Composition. In 2008, she received the Royal Swedish Academy of Music's jazz award.

Jernberg is the leader (together with the pianist Cecilia Persson) of the chamber jazz group Paavo. In 2008, the group received the "jazz group of the year" award from Swedish Radio.

Jernberg is also working on the contemporary classical music scene, in which she serves as both singer and composer. As a singer she has premiered pieces by composers such as Emily Hall, Anna Thorvaldsdottir, Sigurd Fischer Olsen, and Lars Bröndum. She was a soloist with Norrbotten NEO when they performed Arnold Schoenberg's Pierrot Lunaire in 2010, and in Salvatore Sciarrino's Lohengrin in 2014. Jernberg has composed for several established ensembles such as Duo ego and Norrbotten NEO. Other artists have included Jernberg's practice in their work and/or jointly developed forms of interdisciplinary collaboration, such as visual artist Camille Norment in Rapture at the Venice Biennale 2015, or within the cinematic work Union of the North by artists Matthew Barney, Erna Ómarsdóttir, and Valdimar Jóhannsson.

The artist is holding lectures and workshops at various universities around Europe.

Although having been adopted as a young child, Jernberg was never completely disconnected from Ethiopia. After traveling to Addis Ababa in 2000, she emerged into Ethiopian music traditions—inspired by the film Endurance, among other influences—, and soon started collaborating with legendary musician Hailu Mergia. Jernberg lives in Oslo.

== Discography ==
- 2007 - paavo (with Paavo) - Apart Records APCD008
- 2009 - Crochet (with Lene Grenager) - Olof Bright OBCD25
- 2010 - Canço del Paó (with Paavo) - Found You Recordings – FYR013
- 2013 - Exit! (with Fire! Orchestra) - Rune Grammofon RCD 2138
- 2014 - Enter (with Fire! Orchestra) - Rune Grammofon RCD 2158
