= Pierrot lunaire =

Musical setting by Arnold Schoenberg of 21 selected poems by Albert Giraud

- Melodrama by Arnold Schoenberg
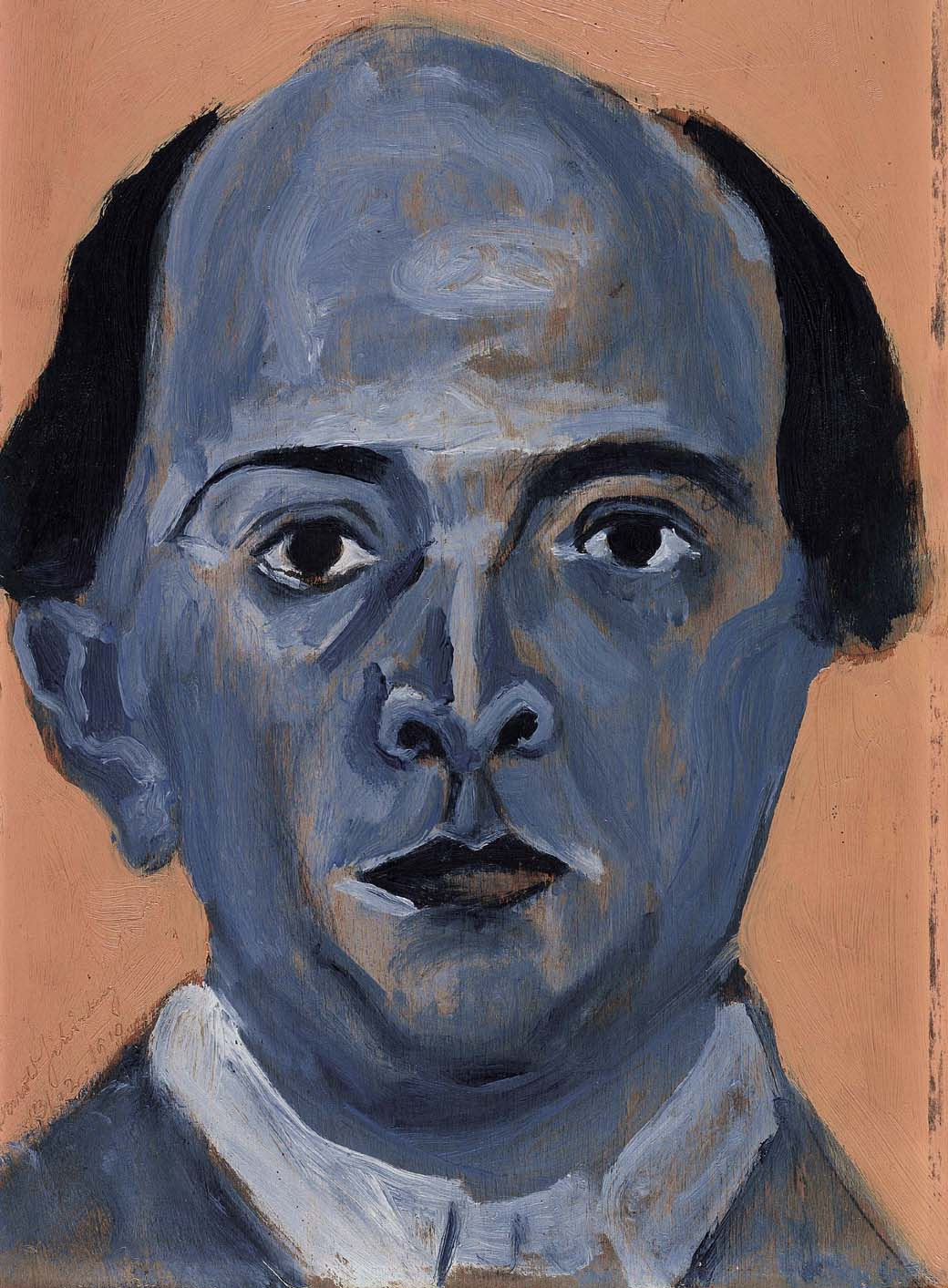
- Self-portrait by Schoenberg, 1910
- Full title: Dreimal sieben Gedichte aus Albert Girauds "Pierrot lunaire"
- Opus: 21
- Style: Free atonality
- Text: Albert Giraud's Pierrot lunaire
- Language: German
- Composed: 1912
- Duration: About 35 to 40 minutes
- Movements: 21
- Scoring: Pierrot ensemble plus reciter

Premiere
- Date: 16 October 1912
- Location: Berlin Choralion-Saal
- Conductor: Arnold Schoenberg
- Performers: Albertine Zehme (voice); Hans W. de Vries (flute); Karl Essberger (clarinet); Jakob Malinjak (violin); Hans Kindler (cello); Eduard Steuermann (piano)

Dreimal sieben Gedichte aus Albert Girauds "Pierrot lunaire" ("Three times Seven Poems from Albert Giraud's 'Pierrot lunaire'"), commonly known simply as Pierrot lunaire, Op. 21 ("Moonstruck Pierrot" or "Pierrot in the Moonlight"), is a melodrama by Arnold Schoenberg. It is a setting of 21 selected poems from Albert Giraud's cycle of the same name as translated into German by Otto Erich Hartleben.

The work is written for reciter (voice-type unspecified in the score, but traditionally performed by a soprano) who delivers the poems in the Sprechstimme style accompanied by a small instrumental ensemble. Schoenberg had previously used a combination of spoken text with instrumental accompaniment, called "melodrama", in the summer-wind narrative of the Gurre-Lieder, which was a fashionable musical style popular at the end of the nineteenth century. Though the music is atonal, it does not employ Schoenberg's twelve-tone technique, which he did not use until 1921.

Pierrot lunaire is among Schoenberg's most celebrated and frequently performed works. Its instrumentation – flute (doubling piccolo), clarinet (doubling bass clarinet), violin (doubling viola), cello, and piano, with the addition of a vocalist – is an important ensemble in 20th- and 21st-century classical music and is referred to as a Pierrot ensemble.

The piece was premiered at the Berlin Choralion-Saal on October 16, 1912, with Albertine Zehme as the vocalist. A typical performance lasts about 35 to 40 minutes. The American premiere took place at the Klaw Theatre, on Broadway, New York, on 4 February 1923 as part of a series of concerts organised by the International Composers' Guild.

== History ==
The work originated in a commission by Albertine Zehme, a former actress, for a cycle for voice and piano, setting a series of poems by the Belgian writer Albert Giraud. The verses had been first published in 1884 and later translated into German by Otto Erich Hartleben. Zehme had previously performed a 'melodrama' by composer Otto Vrieslander based on the translated poems. But, according to Eduard Steuermann, student of Schoenberg and pianist of the premiere, "the music was not strong enough, and someone advised her to approach Schoenberg."

Schoenberg began work on March 12 and completed the piece on July 9, 1912, having expanded the forces to an ensemble consisting of flute (doubling on piccolo), clarinet in A (doubling on bass clarinet and clarinet in B♭), violin (doubling on viola), cello, and piano.

After forty rehearsals, Schoenberg and Zehme (in Columbine dress) gave the premiere at the Berlin Choralion-Saal on October 16, 1912. Reaction was mixed. According to Anton Webern, some in the audience were whistling and laughing, but in the end "it was an unqualified success". According to eyewitness Salka Viertel, the sister of the premiere's pianist Eduard Steuermann,

When she appeared in a Pierrot costume, her painted, frightened face framed by a ruff, her aging ankles in white stockings, she was greeted by an ominous murmur from the audience. One could not help admiring her courage, as she went on from poem to poem, disregarding the hissing, booing and insulting invective shouted at her and Schoenberg. There were also fanatical ovations from the young generation, but the majority were outraged. A well-known virtuoso, his face purple with rage, shouted: "Shoot him. Shoot him," meaning Schoenberg, not the poor, undaunted Pierrot.

There was some criticism of blasphemy in the texts, to which Schoenberg responded, "If they were musical, not a single one would give a damn about the words. Instead, they would go away whistling the tunes."

== Structure ==
Pierrot lunaire consists of three groups of seven poems. In the first group, Pierrot sings of love, sex and religion; in the second, of violence, crime, and blasphemy; and in the third of his return home to Bergamo, with his past haunting him.

Part One

1. Mondestrunken (Drunk with Moonlight)
2. Colombine (Columbine)
3. Der Dandy (The Dandy)
4. Eine blasse Wäscherin (A Pallid Washerwoman)
5. Valse de Chopin
6. Madonna
7. Der kranke Mond (The Sick Moon)

Part Two

8. Nacht (Passacaglia) (Night)
9. Gebet an Pierrot (Prayer to Pierrot)
10. Raub (Theft)
11. Rote Messe (Red Mass)
12. Galgenlied (Gallows Song)
13. Enthauptung (Beheading)
14. Die Kreuze (The Crosses)

Part Three

15. Heimweh (Homesickness)
16. Gemeinheit (Foul Play)
17. Parodie (Parody)
18. Der Mondfleck (The Moon Spot)
19. Serenade
20. Heimfahrt (Barcarole) (Journey Home)
21. O Alter Duft (O Ancient Fragrance)

Schoenberg, who was fascinated by numerology, also makes great use of seven-note motifs throughout the work, while the ensemble (with conductor) comprises seven people. The piece is his opus 21, contains 21 poems, and was begun on March 12, 1912. Other key numbers in the work are 3 and 13: each poem consists of 13 lines (two four-line verses followed by a five-line verse), while the first line of each poem occurs three times (being repeated as lines 7 and 13).

== Music and text ==
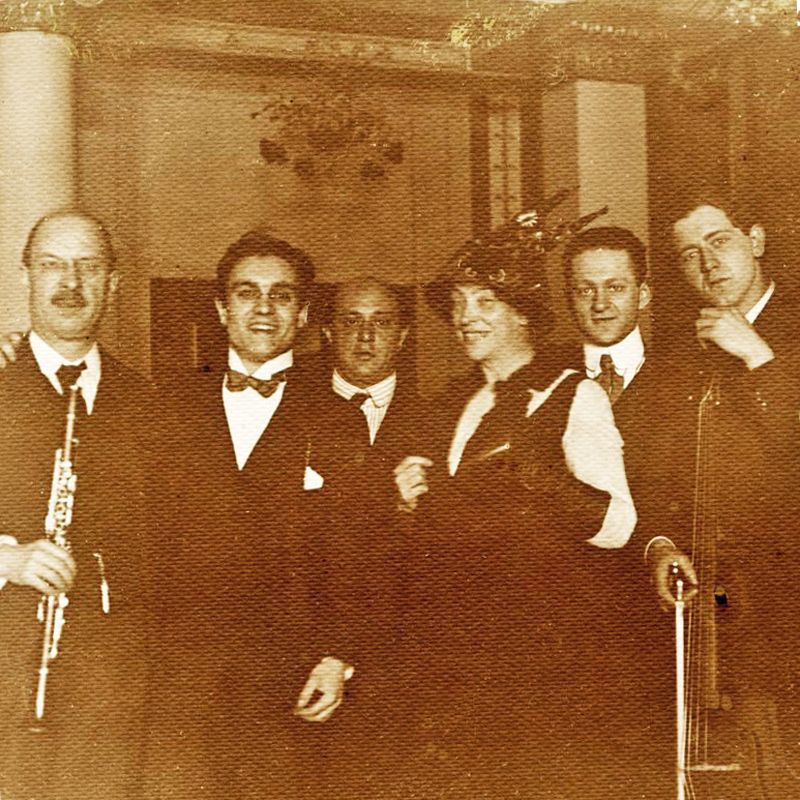
The ensemble that premiered Pierrot lunaire

Though written in a freely atonal style, Pierrot lunaire uses a variety of classical forms and techniques, including canon, fugue, rondo, passacaglia, and free counterpoint.

The instrumental combinations (including doublings) vary between most movements. The entire ensemble is used only in Nos. 6, 11, 14, 15 (end), 16, 18, 19 (end), 20, and 21. Musicologist Alan Lessem states about the work that "on the whole instrumental textures tend to become fuller as the work progresses" and that, in general, "the piano is the leading [instrumental] protagonist of the melodramas."

The poetry is a German version of a rondeau of the old French type with a double refrain. Each poem consists of three stanzas of 4 + 4 + 5 lines, with the first two lines of the first stanza (1,2) repeated as the last two lines of the second stanza (7,8), and line 1 additionally repeated (13) to close the third stanza and the poem. The first poem is shown below.

1. Mondestrunken (Drunk with Moonlight)

Den Wein, den man mit Augen trinkt,
Giesst Nachts der Mond in Wogen nieder,
Und eine Springflut überschwemmt
Den stillen Horizont.

Gelüste schauerlich und süss,
Durchschwimmen ohne Zahl die Fluten!
Den Wein, den man mit Augen trinkt,
Giesst Nachts der Mond in Wogen nieder.

Der Dichter, den die Andacht treibt,
Berauscht sich an dem heilgen Tranke,
Gen Himmel wendet er verzückt
Das Haupt und taumelnd saugt und schlürft er
Den Wein, den man mit Augen trinkt.

The wine that one drinks with one's eyes
Is poured down in waves by the moon at night,
And a spring tide overflows
The silent horizon.

Lusts, thrilling and sweet
Float numberless through the waters!
The wine that one drinks with one's eyes
Is poured down in waves by the moon at night.

The poet, urged on by his devotions,
Becomes intoxicated with the sacred beverage;
Enraptured, he turns toward heaven
His head, and, staggering, sucks and sips
The wine that one drinks with one's eyes.

=== Sprechstimme / Sprechgesang ===
The atonal, expressionistic settings of the text, with their echoes of German cabaret, bring the poems vividly to life. Sprechstimme is a style in which the vocalist uses the specified rhythms and pitches but does not sustain the pitches, allowing them to drop or rise, in the manner of speech. Schoenberg describes the technique in a foreword to the score:

The melody given in notation in the vocal part (with a few specially indicated exceptions) is not intended to be sung. The performer has the task of transforming it into a speech melody [Sprechmelodie], taking the prescribed pitches carefully into account. He accomplishes this by:

1. adhering to the rhythm as precisely as if he were singing; that is, with no more freedom than he would allow himself if it were sung melody;
2. being precisely aware of the difference between a sung tone and a spoken tone: the sung tone maintains the pitch unaltered; the spoken tone does indicate it, but immediately abandons it again by falling or rising. But the performer must take great care not to lapse into a singsong speech pattern. That is absolutely not intended. The goal is certainly not at all realistic, natural speech. On the contrary, the difference between ordinary speech and speech that collaborates in a musical form must be made plain. But it should not call singing to mind, either.

Furthermore, the following should be said about the performance:

The performer's task here is at no time to derive the mood and character or the individual pieces from the meaning of the words, but always solely from the music. To the extent that the tonepainterly representation [tonmalerische Darstellung] of the events and feelings in the text were of importance to the composer, it will be found in the music anyway. Wherever the performer fails to find it, he must resist adding something that the composer did not intend. If he did so, he would not be adding, but subtracting.

— Arnold Schoenberg [English translation by Stanley Appelbaum]

In the score, Sprechstimme is indicated with small x's through the stems of notes. Though Sprechstimme is used throughout the piece, Schoenberg also occasionally indicates that certain passages are to be sung (gesungen).

== Notable recordings ==
Notable recordings of this composition include:

Voice	Ensemble	Conductor	Record company	Year of recording	Format
Erika Stiedry-Wagner	Rudolf Kolisch, violin and viola; Stefan Auber, cello; Edward Steuermann, piano; Leonard Posella, flute and piccolo; and Kalman Bloch, clarinet and bass clarinet	Arnold Schoenberg	Columbia Records	1940	LP
Helga Pilarczyk	Members of the Conservatory Society Concert Orchestra	Pierre Boulez	Ades	1961	LP, CD
Bethany Beardslee	Columbia Chamber Ensemble	Robert Craft	Columbia / CBS	1963	LP
Jan DeGaetani	Contemporary Chamber Ensemble	Arthur Weisberg	Nonesuch	1970	LP, CD
Cleo Laine	Nash Ensemble	Elgar Howarth	RCA Red Seal	1974	LP
Yvonne Minton	Ensemble InterContemporain	Pierre Boulez	Columbia	1977	LP, CD
Barbara Sukowa	Schoenberg Ensemble	Reinbert de Leeuw	Koch Schwann	1988	CD
Maria Höglind	Sonanza Ensemble	Jan Risberg	Caprice records	1990	CD
Jane Manning	Nash Ensemble	Simon Rattle	Chandos	1991	CD
Phyllis Bryn-Julson	New York New Music Ensemble	Robert Black	GM Recordings	1992	CD
Phyllis Bryn-Julson	Ensemble Modern	Peter Eötvös	RCA Victor Red Seal	1993	CD
Karin Ott	Cremona Musica Insieme	Pietro Antonini	Nuova Era	1994	CD
Christine Schäfer	Ensemble InterContemporain	Pierre Boulez	Deutsche Grammophon	1997	CD
Anja Silja	Twentieth Century Classics Ensemble	Robert Craft	Naxos	1999	CD

Arnold Schoenberg himself made test recordings of the music with a group of Los Angeles musicians, nearly all European immigrants, from September 24 to 26, 1940. These recordings were eventually released on LP by Columbia Records in 1949, and reissued in 1974 on the Odyssey label.

The jazz singer Cleo Laine recorded Pierrot lunaire in 1974. Her version was nominated for a classical Grammy Award. Another jazz singer who has performed the piece is Sofia Jernberg, who sang it with Norrbotten NEO.

The avant-pop star Björk, known for her interest in avant-garde music, performed Pierrot lunaire at the 1996 Verbier Festival with Kent Nagano conducting. According to the singer in a 2004 interview, "Kent Nagano wanted to make a recording of it, but I really felt that I would be invading the territory of people who sing this for a lifetime [sic]." Only small recorded excerpts (possibly bootlegs) of her performance have become available.

The American mezzo-soprano Mary Nessinger has performed Pierrot lunaire extensively with organizations such as the Chamber Music Society of Lincoln Center, Chamber Music Northwest, and Sequitur at venues including Alice Tully Hall and Weill Recital Hall at Carnegie Hall.

In March 2011, Bruce LaBruce directed a performance at the Hebbel am Ufer Theatre in Berlin. This interpretation of the work included gender diversity, castration scenes and dildos, as well as a female to male transgender Pierrot. LaBruce subsequently filmed this adaptation as the 2014 theatrical film Pierrot lunaire.

== Legacy as a standard ensemble ==
The quintet of instruments used in Pierrot lunaire became the core ensemble for The Fires of London, who formed in 1965 as "The Pierrot Players" to perform Pierrot lunaire, and continued to concertize with a varied classical and contemporary repertory. This group performed works arranged for these instruments and commissioned new works especially to take advantage of this ensemble's instrumental colors, up until it disbanded in 1987.

Over the years, other groups have continued to use this instrumentation professionally (current groups include Da Capo Chamber Players, eighth blackbird and the Finnish contemporary group Uusinta Lunaire) and have built a large repertoire for the ensemble.

== Notes ==
!Authority control
