= Matthew Peterson =

American classical composer

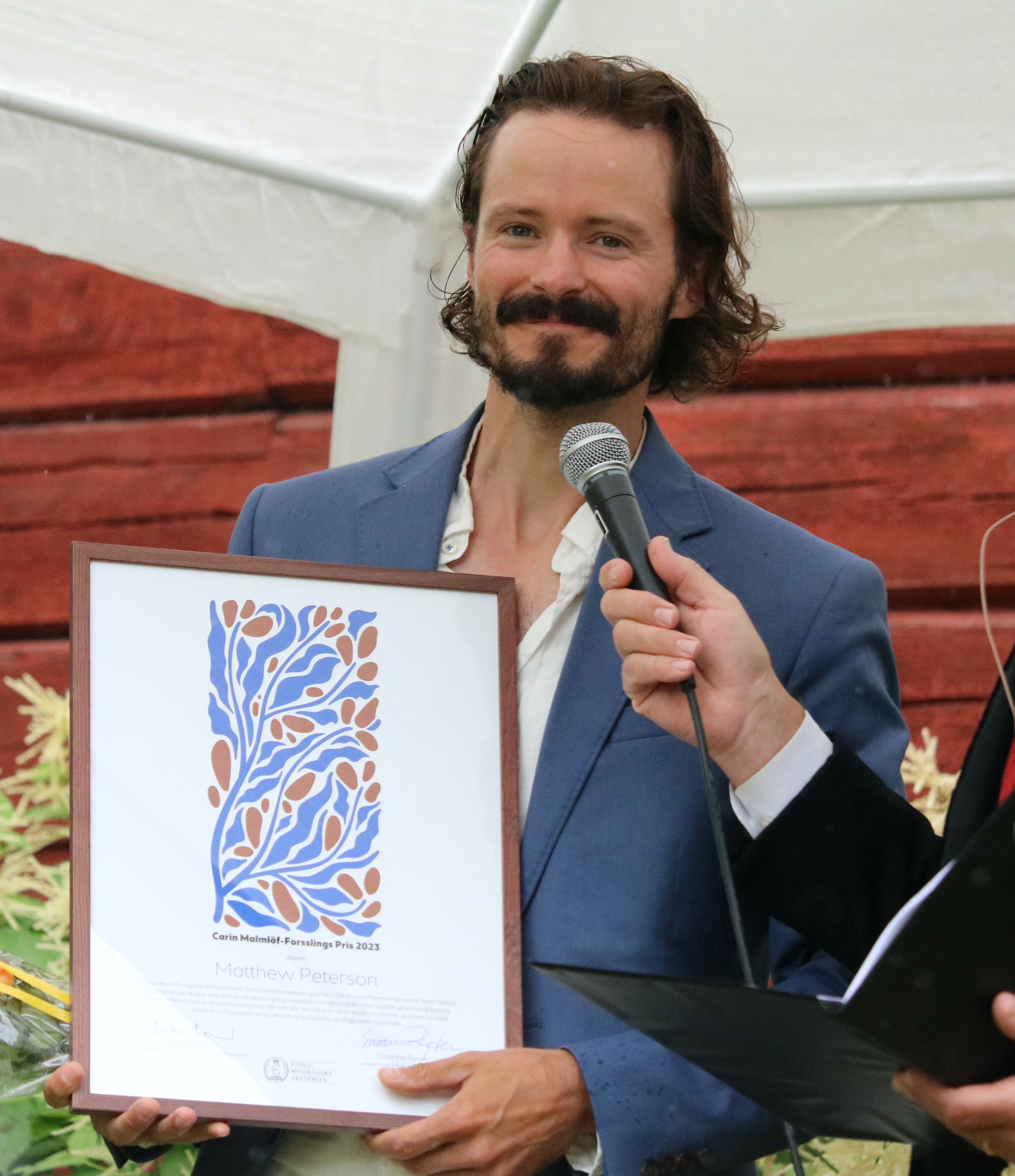
composer Matthew Peterson receives the 2023 Carin Malmlöf-Forssling composer prize from the Swedish Royal Academy of Music

Matthew Peterson (born July 22, 1984) is a classical composer of operas, choral works, orchestral and chamber music.

== Biography ==
Matthew Peterson was born and raised in Grand Forks, North Dakota. He studied music composition at St. Olaf College, Indiana University Jacobs School of Music and Gotland School of Music Composition where his teachers included Mary Ellen Childs and Sven-David Sandström.

Peterson is a freelance composer based in Smedjebacken, Sweden, first arriving on a Fulbright Award in 2008. His Fulbright project was the true-crime chamber opera Voir Dire, a work that received critical-acclaim after its 2017 world premiere at Fort Worth Opera. He is a member of FST (the Association of Swedish Composers) and has been commissioned by Swedish musicians and ensembles including the Swedish Radio Choir, Dalasinfoniettan, guitarist Mårten Falk, Gustaf Sjökvist Chamber Choir, Uppsala Vokalensemble, Sofia Vokalensemble, and Stockholm Saxophone Quartet. His music has been featured at international music festivals Svensk Musikvår, Purpur (South Africa), Ljudvågor, Lund Choral Festival, Jubilate and Sound of Stockholm.

In 2014 Peterson was awarded the ASCAP Rudolph Nissim Award for orchestral composition. The same year he won both first prize and the audience/radio-listener's prize at the Uppsala composer competition for And all the trees of the field will clap their hands for chamber orchestra, and his true-crime opera Voir Dire was the winner of the Fort Worth Opera Frontiers showcase for new opera. In 2021 Peterson was awarded the first Sven-David Sandström Choral Composition Award from the Royal Swedish Academy of Music. The Royal Academy also awarded him with the 2023 Carin Malmlöf-Forssling composer prize.

== Concert works ==
Peterson's music has been performed at venues across Europe and North America such as the Kennedy Center, Berwaldhallen, Stockholms Konserthuset, Minneapolis Orchestra Hall and Gothenburg Konserthuset by ensembles including the Swedish Radio Choir, Stockholm Saxophone Quartet, Minnesota Orchestra, Washington National Opera, Atlanta Symphony Orchestra, Gothenburg Symphony Orchestra, VocalEssence, Malmö Symphony, Chanticleer, Vanemuine Symphony, Fort Worth Opera, Colorado Springs Philharmonic, and others. His works are regularly performed on St. Olaf College’s annual Christmas concerts.

== Operas ==
=== Voir Dire ===
The courtroom opera Voir Dire is adapted from true-crime stories witnessed by librettist Jason Zencka while he was court reporter for the Stevens Point Journal. The 2017 world premiere production by Fort Worth Opera received national critical acclaim. Opera Now called Voir Dire “startlingly immediate and journalistic in feel, made memorable by the depth and texture of the music.” Heidi Waleson, in her review for The Wall Street Journal, wrote: “The opera drills unsentimentally into the tragedies of ordinary people...its power lies in how believable their emotions are.”

=== Lifeboat ===
Lifeboat, an opera with libretto by Emily Roller, is inspired by the Syrian refugee crisis. A John F Kennedy Center Commission for Washington National Opera, it premiered January 14, 2017 at the Kennedy Center. Classical Voice America praised Peterson's “admirable mastery of both vocal writing and colorful orchestration,” and Anne Midgette of the Washington Post wrote “Lifeboat began dramatically with a storm scene, then moved onto the tranquility of the becalmed, focusing on three shipwreck survivors in a lifeboat, and culminating in a vocal trio that Peterson was able to make truly beautiful.”

=== The Binding of Isaac ===
Peterson's first opera, The Binding of Isaac, is a modern retelling of the Biblical story of Abraham, set in a religious-fundamentalist compound. This was Peterson's first collaboration with librettist and writer Jason Zencka. It premiered at St. Olaf College in 2006 and was awarded the 2007 BMI Student Composer Award.

== Awards ==
- 2006 Chanticleer Student Composer Award for The Bedtime Prayer
- 2007 BMI Student Composer Award for The Binding of Isaac
- 2008 Fulbright Grant to Sweden
- 2010 BMI Student Composer Award for Reflections on the Death of the Beloved
- 2010 Vista Award for New Opera for Voir Dire
- 2014 ASCAP Foundation Rudolf Nissim Prize for Hyperborea
- 2014 First Prize in Uppsala Composers Competition for And all the trees of the field will clap their hands
- 2014 Fort Worth Opera Frontiers Prize for Voir Dire
- 2015 Minnesota Orchestra Composers Institute for Hyperborea
- 2016 Washington National Opera John F. Kennedy Center Commission for Lifeboat
- 2018 Washington International Competition for Composition for November (pas de deux)
- 2021 Dalecarlia Music Awards "Classical of the Year"
- 2021 Sven-David Sandström Choral Composition Award

== Recordings ==
- Cantate Domino on album In Paradisum (2019, Footprint) with Sofia Vokalensemble
- Ljusfälten on album Fields of Lights (2020, Footprint) with Uppsala Vokalensemble
- VOIR DIRE: a courtroom opera (2020, RedHouse) original cast recording
- Smooth Fat Nasty: Matthew Peterson - the saxophone works (2021) with Stockholm Saxophone Quartet

== Works ==
=== Symphonies ===
- Symphony No. 1: The Singing Wilderness (2021)

=== Operas ===
- The Binding of Isaac, chamber opera for four singers and seven instruments, libretto by Jason Zencka (2006)
- Voir Dire, chamber opera for five singers and nine players, libretto by Jason Zencka (2016)
- Lifeboat, chamber opera for soprano, mezzo, baritone and chamber orchestra, libretto by Emily Roller (2016)

=== Orchestral works ===
- Reflections on the Death of the Beloved for band (2009)
- Icumen for orchestra (2011)
- Hyperborea for orchestra (2011)
- Dawn: Redeeming, Radiant for orchestra (2012)
- And all the trees of the field shall clap their hands for chamber orchestra (2013)
- Corde Natus for orchestra (2014)
- Tumult and Flood for chamber orchestra (2015)
- Newborn Glimmer for orchestra (2019)
- The Loons of Lac La Croix for orchestra (2020)
- Symphony No. 1: The Singing Wilderness (2021)
- The Way of a Canoe for orchestra (2021)
- Aurora for orchestra (2022)
- Four Northern Visions for orchestra (2022)

=== Choral works ===
- The Bedtime Prayer for SATB choir a cappella (2004)
- Miserere Mei for SATB a cappella (2006)
- Surgit Dorpatum SSAA a cappella (2015)
- Lux Aeterna for double SATB choir a cappella (2017)
- Ljusfälten for SATB a cappella (2018) to six poems of Edith Södergran
- Sommar i bergen for SATB and nyckelharpa (2018) to poem by Edith Södergran
- Cantate Domino for SATB (2018)
- Adoramus Te for SMATBB (2018)
- Ave Maris Stella motet for SSAATTBB (2018)
- And Lo, A Great Multitude for double SATB choir a cappella (2020)
- Non Nobis for SATB choir a cappella (2020)
- Salve Regina for SMATBB (2020)
- In the Beginning for SATB and saxophone quartet (2020)
- Behold I make all things new for SATB choir a cappella (2021)
- An Inner Sky for SATB to three poems by E. E. Cummings (2022)
- l(a leaf falls)onliness to poem of E. E. Cummings (2022)
- ! o(rounD)moon to poem of E. E. Cummings (2022)
- brIght to poem of E. E. Cummings (2022)

=== Solo works ===
- kick for percussion (2009)
- Bound and Unbound for piano (2011)
- Huldra for marimba (2014)
- smooth fat nasty for baritone saxophone (2017)
- Peregrinations for guitar (2017)
- Koraconnes for cello (2019)
- The baddest girl on the mountain for alto saxophone (2019)
- polska plska pla for piano (2019)
- Laud for organ (2020)
- To the Firmament for organ (2020)
- Shamans of the Digital Wasteland for frame drum and electronics (2021)

=== Chamber music ===
- Brutal Music for flute, clarinet, percussion, piano, violin, viola, cello, double bass (2010)
- Thunderheads for 2 percussionists (2011)
- Empire Builder for flute, piano, violin (2012)
- Mass for soprano and percussion (2012)
- Badlands for string quartet (2013)
- January for string trio (2016)
- Vingar, Virvlar for soprano and tenor saxophone (2018)
- Dance Party Playlist for saxophone quartet (2019)
- Lament for Sven-David Sandström for saxophone quartet (2020)

=== Electronic music ===
- Horizons (2011)
- Rain Dances (2012)
- Shamans of the Digital Wasteland for frame drum and electronics (2021)
