= Siebenbürgen (band) =

Music group from Sweden

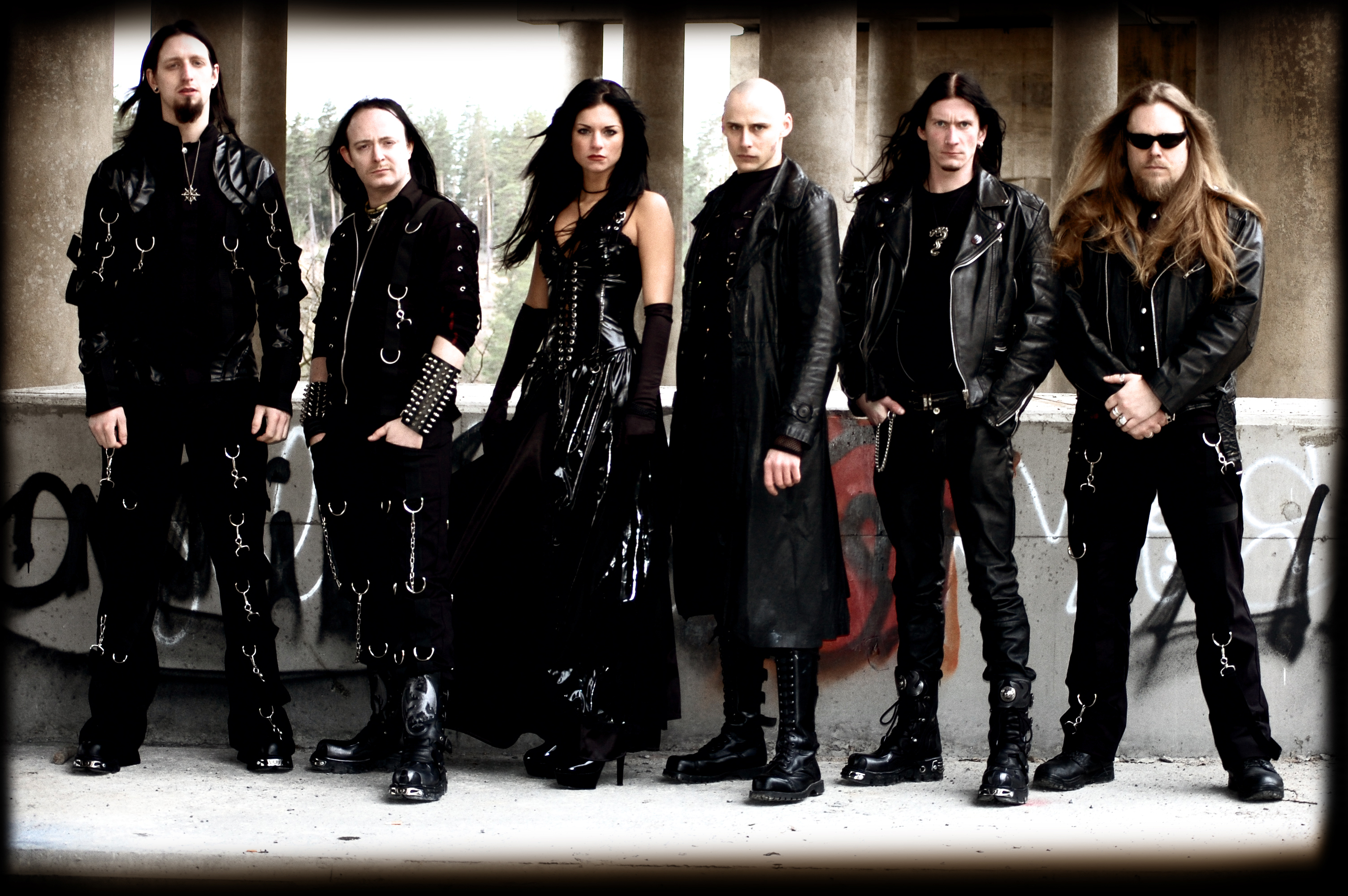
- Siebenbürgen 2008.

Background information
- Origin: Stockholm, Sweden
- Genres: Melodic black metal, gothic metal
- Years active: 1994–2006; 2007–2009
- Labels: Massacre, Napalm
- Members: Lisa Bohwalli Simonsson; Marcus Ehlin; Richard Bryngelsson; Joakim Ohlsson; Johnnie Gunther; Dennis Ekdahl
- Past members: (see below)

Siebenbürgen was a melodic black metal band from Stockholm, Sweden, formed in 1994.

== History ==
Marcus Ehlin and Anders Rosdahl formed the band was formed in 1994. Fredrik Brockert joined them within a few months. In February, 1996 they recorded their first, self-titled demo tape. After the demo's release, Linus Ekström joined the band. By that time, they had started playing shows, supporting Bewitched, Sacramentum and In Aeturnum.

During the Halloween weekend of 1996, Siebenbürgen recorded their second demo, Ungentum Pharelis. This demo led to a contract with Napalm Records, and their release of their first album, Loreia, in 1997. In October/November 1997, Siebenbürgen had three shows in Germany, with Forbidden Site and Menhir. During January/February 1998, Siebenbürgen recorded their second album, Grimjaur, and released in May of that year, followed by a tour in July with Atanatos and Ragnarök. After the release of Grimjaur, Lovisa Hallstedt, who had contributed female vocals and violin on all previous releases, left the band. She was replaced in 1999 with female vocalist Kicki Höijertz.

Tristania, The Sins of Thy Beloved, Trail of Tears and Antichrisis accompanied Siebenbürgen on their next tour, which consisted of 18 shows in Germany, Austria, Netherlands, Belgium and Switzerland. Beginning with the follow-up to Grimjaur, Delictum, Siebenbürgen wrote lyrics in English instead of Swedish (though some albums during the early to mid 2000s contain songs in Swedish). The lyrics continued to depict folklore in the style of fairytales.

After a hiatus starting in 2006, they reformed in 2007 with a new lineup. In 2008, Revelation VI was released.

Siebenbürgen disbanded again in 2009.

== Discography ==
Studio albums

- Loreia (1997)
- Grimjaur (1998)
- Delictum (2000)
- Plagued Be Thy Angel (2001)
- Darker Designs & Images (2005)
- Revelation VI (2008)

Live albums

- Siebenbürgen - Live (1996)

Demo albums

- Siebenbürgen (1996)
- Ungentum Pharelis (1996)

== Members ==
Recent

- Lisa Bohwalli Simonsson – vocals
- Marcus Ehlin – vocals, bass
- Richard Bryngelsson – guitars
- Joakim Ohlsson – guitars
- Johnnie Gunther – keyboards
- Dennis Ekdahl – drums

Former

- Lovisa Hallstedt – violin, backing vocals
- Erika Roos – vocals
- Kicki Höijertz – vocals
- Turid Walderhaug – vocals
- Fredrik Brockert – bass
- Niklas Sandin – bass
- Linus Ekström – guitars
- Fredrik Folkare – guitars
- Anders Rosdahl – drums
