= Matthew Peterson (disambiguation) =

Matthew Peterson or Petersen may refer to:

- Matthew Peterson (born 1984), American composer
- Matthew Peterson (Canadian football) (born 2001), Canadian football player
- Matthew Petersen (born 1980), Australian rugby player
- Matthew S. Petersen (born 1970), American attorney
