= Peärls Before Swïne Experience =

Ensemble devoted to contemporary classical music

Pearls Before Swine Experience are an ensemble devoted to contemporary classical music. Their repertoire consists of short pieces (around 5 min) written by contemporary composers from Sweden and abroad. Their home stage is the culture club SEKT. They have been awarded the "Kristallpriset" contemporary music prize and The Society of Swedish Composers' Interpreter prize.

The ensemble regularly commission works from established composers such as Annie Gosfield and Per Mårtensson.

== Musicians ==
- George Kentros - Violin
- Mats Olofsson - cello
- Sara Hammarström - Flutes
- Mårten Landström - Piano

== Selected repertoire ==
- Lars Ekström: Beat my Ora Dora (1994)
- Per Mårtensson: In Flight (1995), Quartet (2000)
- Tristan Murail: Feuilles a travers les cloches (2000)
- Michel van der Aa: Quadrivial (1996)
- Mika Pelo: Chains and transparency (1996)
- David Lang: Short Fall (2000)
- S. Patric Simmerud: Pearls from Swine (1996)
- Ida Lundén: lilla p (1996)
- Fredrik Fahlman: Autumn Melody (1996)
- Dror Feiler: P.O.P (2002)
- Henrik Strindberg: Lågmälda göranden (2002)
- Fredrik Hedelin: The Glass Bead Game (2003)
- Sten Hanson: 5 Musical Aphorisms (2003)
- Folke Rabe: A chaser (2004)
- Anders Hillborg: Truffle hymn (2000)
- Mikael Edlund: Cosi ballano i cingiali (1999)
- Tony Blomdahl: (2005) Antifocus
- Cristian Marina: Falso Brilliante (2006)
- Simon Steen Andersen: Next to Beside Besides # 6 (2007)
- Mårten Josjö: Tangtram No. 1 (1996)
- Mauro Godoy Villalobos: Tango (2003)

== Discography ==
- the peärls before swïne experience, Caprice Records CAP21587. 1998
- swïne live!, Caprice CAP21715. 2002
- More Canned Porridge (Sten Hanson), Firework Edition Records FER 1056. 2006
