= Stockholm Saxophone Quartet =

Swedish saxophone group

The Stockholm Saxophone Quartet (sv: Stockholms Saxofonkvartett) is a Swedish saxophone quartet dedicated to contemporary music. They have commissioned and performed more than 700 pieces written by some of the most established composers in the world. The group also co-arrange Sound of Stockholm - the biggest festival in Sweden for contemporary music. They have released several CDs on the public label "Phono Suecia" and have toured in both in Europe, South America and Africa.

== Musicians ==
- Mathias Karlsen Björnstad - soprano saxophone
- Jörgen Pettersson - alto saxophone
- Leif Karlborg - tenor saxophone
- Linn Persson - baritone saxophone

== Repertoire ==
- Javier Alvarez
- Ylva Q Arkvik
- Sven-Erik Bäck
- Csaba Deák
- Karólína Eiríksdóttir
- Anders Eliasson
- Göran Gamstorp
- Madeleine Isaksson
- Johan Jeverud
- Ingvar Karkoff
- Maurice Karkoff
- Mats Larsson Gothe
- Christer Lindwall
- Cristian Marina
- Sten Melin
- Arne Mellnäs
- Jan W. Morthenson
- Satoshi Ohmae
- Kent Olofsson
- Åke Parmerud
- Matthew Peterson
- Henri Pousseur
- Karin Rehnqvist
- Marie Samuelsson
- Sven-David Sandström
- Henrik Strindberg
- Iannis Xenakis
- Valton Beqiri
- Helena Tulve : ECM "Öö"

== Discography ==
- VIVAX (PSCD 32, 1990) Csaba Deák: Quintet for Alto Saxophone and String Quartet (1988). Soloist Jörgen Pettersson.
- STOCKHOLM SAXOPHONE QUARTET (CAP 21399, 1992). Works by nine Swedish composers.
- STOCKHOLM SYMPHONIC WIND ORCHESTRA (CAP 21414, 1992) Concerto for Alto Saxophone and Wind Orchestra. Soloist Jörgen Pettersson.
- SAXOPHONE CON FORZA (PSCD 81) Jörgen Pettersson. Works by eight Swedish composers.
- STOCKHOLM SAXOPHONE QUARTET - LINKS (CAP 21517, 1997).
- ENCORES (PSSACD 146, 2004)

== Sources ==
- Stockholm Saxophone Quartet
- Parked at Loopia
