= Martin Q Larsson =

Martin Q Larsson, born 3 May 1968 in Trollhättan, Sweden, is a Swedish composer, musician, and incubator manager.

He studied at the Royal College of Music in Stockholm, where he was taught by Sven-David Sandström and Pär Lindgren among others. Larsson has lived in Stockholm since the 1980s, but composed the music when Trollhättan celebrated 100 years as a city.

In 2010–17 he served as the president of the Swedish Society of Composers, and board member of several culture organizations in Sweden and Europe. Since 2018, he has been the director of Subtopia’s creative incubator Katapult, formerly called Klump. He is also president of creARTive, the national Swedish organization for creative incubators.
