= Ylva Arkvik =

Swedish composer

Ylva Q Arkvik (born 1961) is a prominent composer of contemporary classical music. She has written about 50 works for varying settings such as chamber ensemble, orchestra, choir, opera, theatre and electroacoustic music. Her works have been performed by Swedish ensembles and orchestras such as the Royal Stockholm Philharmonic Orchestra, the Swedish Radio Symphony Orchestra, Kroumata, the Stockholm Saxophone Quartet and Musica Vitae.

== Biography ==
Arkvik was born in Sweden. She studied musicology at Uppsala University and also studied to become a cantor at Uppsala Domkapitel and at the Royal Swedish Academy of Music. After graduating as a cantor she went on to study composition at the Royal College of Music, Stockholm for renowned composers Lars Ekström, Magnus Lindberg, Per Lindgren, Lars-Erik Rosell and Sven-David Sandström. In 2000 she earned her diploma in composition. In 2001 she was elected to the Society of Swedish Composers. Between 2011-2014 she was in the board of directors of the Association of Swedish Women Composers (KVAST) and during 2014 she was elected Chairman. Since 2010 she is in the board of directors of the International Society for Contemporary Music (ISCM).

Her music has been described as firmly rooted in the modernist tradition with a profoundly concentrated mode of expression, sometimes harsh and passionately intense.

== Selection of compositions ==
Orchestra

- A challenge to humanity, cantata for mixed choir and wind orchestra, duration 28 min (2008). Written for the international music project Vox pacis, involving choirs and soloists from 15 different countries. First performance 22 Aug 2008 in the Blue Hall, Stockholm City Hall.
- Tidsgömmor for 2 sopranos, mixed choir, orchestra and electronics, duration 22 min (2005). First performance 1 May 2006, Swedish Radio P2.
- De som varit, de som ska komma, de som blev, for orchestra, duration 17 min (1999-2002). First performance August 2002, by the Royal Stockholm Philharmonic Orchestra, Stockholm Concert Hall.
- Tid läggs som tunt papper över beröringarna, for string orchestra, duration 10 min (1997). First performance by Musica Vitae, Växjö.
- Enigma 15, for orchestra, duration 14 min (1996). First performance 1996 at the Royal College of Music, Stockholm.

Chamber orchestra

- Johannes Uppenbarelse, oratorio for mixed choir, chamber orchestra, organ and electronics. First premiered 17 March 2013, Högalid Church, Stockholm.

Opera

- Barnet och de grå, for 2 sopranos and piano, percussion and alto saxophone, duration 19 min. Premiered 2 December 2007, Stockholm.
- Du får inte gå, for soprano, mezzo-soprano, baryton and 11 instruments, duration 24 min (2002). Premiered 26 July 2002, Vadstena Castle.
- Solitario, for 2 sopranos, 1 mezzo, 2 baryton, chamber orchestra and electronics, libretto Eva Runefelt, duration 50 min (1999). Premiered at the Plaza Theatre, Stockholm.

Choir

- Psalm 142, for mixed choir, duration 3 min (2009). First performance 8 March 2010 at the Högalid Church, Stockholm.
- En gång ska allt försvinna bort, for mixed choir, duration 4 min (1999). First performance November 1999 by Maria Magdalena Motettkör, Örebro.
- Rata de ciudad, for mixed choir and 3 percussionists, duration 7 min (1997). First performance by Capella Kreuzberg at Emmauskirche, Berlin.

Pieces for ensembles

- Lines from the future, for chamber ensemble, duration 9 min (1997). First performance by Sonanza, Stockholm.
- Cataract, for violin and electronics, duration 10 min (1996). First performance 31 March 2010, Kulturhuset, Stockholm.
- Dona nobis pacem, theatre music, duration 90 min (1996). First performance 1996, Arbogaspelen in Arboga.
- Pictures, for string quartet, duration 12 min (1995)., First performance 1995, Glashuset, Stockholm.
- Qué, for saxophone quartet, duration 7 min (1995). First performance 1995 by the Stockholm Saxophone Quartet, Fylkingen, Stockholm.
- Chiffer, for six percussionists, duration 8 min (1994). First performance 1994 by Kroumata, Helsingfors, Finland.

Pieces for 1-3 instruments

- Leave me!, for oboe and percussion, duration 8 min (2004). First performance 8 December 2009, Stockholm.
- Cold and clear, for violin solo, duration 4 min (2003). First performance March 2003, Royal Swedish Academy of Music, Stockholm.
- No comments, for alto saxophone and piano, duration 8 min (2003). First performance June 2003, Schwarzwald Festival of Music, Germany.
- Skarpa, vassa, for violin solo, duration 9 min (2003). First performance March 2003, Royal Swedish Academy of Music, Stockholm.
- Gestures, for percussion solo, duration 8 min (1997). First performance 1997, Royal College of Music, Stockholm.
- Esconderé, for flute solo, duration 5 min (1995). First performance 1995, Royal College of Music, Stockholm.

Piano solo

- Capriccio quasi fantasia, for piano, duration 6 min (2010). First performance 27 Aug 2010, Berwaldhallen, Stockholm.
- Spread it out, for piano and electronics, duration 15 min (2010). First performance 31 March 2010, Kulturhuset, Stockholm.
- Dance with me!, for piano and electronics, 11 min (2003). First performance March 2003, St: Eskil Church, Stockholm.

Electronics, with or without instruments

- Psalm 23 and 142, for electronics, 10 min (2009). First performance 29 April 2010, Heliga Trefaldighetskyrkan, Gävle.
- Herre, var är du?, for electronics, 6 min (2009). First performance 8 March 2010, Högalid Church, Stockholm.
- Jag ropar till Herren, for soprano and electronics, 3 min (2009). First performance 8 March 2010, Högalid Church, Stockholm.
- Tagel, for electronics and sounds, 13 min (20089. First performance 4 October 2008, Västerås Konserthus.
- Restless wind, for violin and electronics, 10 min (2007). First performance 15 November 2007, Gävle.
- Eko, for viola da gamba, lute, recorder and electronics, 6 min (2004). First performance November 2004, Växjö.
- The day before…, for recorder and electronics, 8 min (2004). First performance November 2004, Växjö.
- Andorien, for flute and electronics, duration 9 min (2002). First performance 2002, Johannebergskyrkan, Gothenburg.
- Väsen, for cello and electronics, duration 10 min (1998). First performance in 1998, Västerås.
- The power in between, for saxophone quartet and electronics, duration 10 min (1997). First performance 1997 by the Stockholm Saxophone Quartet, Royal College of Music, Stockholm.
- Clou, for electronics, duration 6 min (1995). First performance 1995, Kulturhuset, Stockholm.
