= Sarah Ioannides =

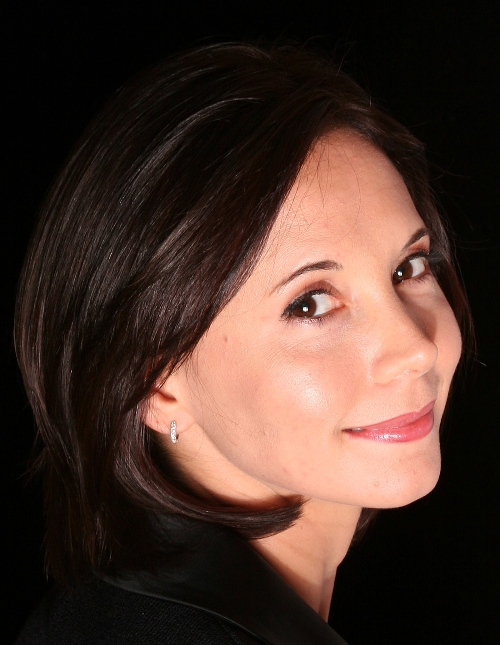

Background information
- Born: 2 April 1972 (age 54); Canberra, Australia
- Genre: Classical
- Occupation: Conductor
- Instruments: Violin, Piano, French Horn
- Website: www.sarahioannidesmusic.com

Sarah Ioannides (born 1972, Canberra) is a British conductor, collaborator, and multimedia producer living in the United States. She is the music director laureate of Symphony Tacoma, the founding artistic director of Cascade Conducting and Composing, the resident conductor of the NYO-USA, and the director of orchestral activities at Boston University.

== Early life and education ==
Ioannides was born in Canberra, Australia, and grew up in England, where she was educated at Cranleigh School. Her father, Ayis Ioannides, is a conductor and composer of Greek Cypriot ancestry Her mother, Gwyneth Woollard, is of Scottish ancestry. Sarah Ioannides studyed violin, piano, and French horn from an early age, and entered Oxford University on an instrumental scholarship, earning a Bachelor of Arts and Masters of Music degree from the Guildhall School of Music and Drama. She completed a Diploma in Conducting at the Curtis Institute of Music on a Fulbright scholarship and studied in St. Petersburg on a Presser Foundation Scholarship. She earned a Master of Music in Conducting from the Juilliard School, where she was assistant conductor to Otto-Werner Mueller.

== Early career ==
While at Oxford, Ioannides took her first position as music director at the age of 19 with the Oxford Philharmonia and music director of Oxford University Opera, leading the European premiere of Stephen Paulus's The Woodlanders. Serving as assistant conductor and productor coordinator to Tan Dun from 1999 to 2003, Ioannides was responsible for orchestra preparation, directing choirs, and coordinating productions on international tours with him. From 2002 to 2004, she was assistant conductor of the Cincinnati Symphony Orchestra and music director of the Cincinnati Symphony Youth Orchestra. In 2003 and 2006, she conducted in the Naumburg Orchestral Concerts, in the Naumburg Bandshell, Central Park, in the summer series.

== Music Director Positions ==
From 2005 to 2011, Ioannides was music director of the El Paso Symphony Orchestra. During her tenure, she expanded the contemporary repertoire of the orchestra and directed and commissioned films for live orchestral multimedia performances. Ioannides also became music director of the Spartanburg Philharmonic Orchestra in 2005, serving in that position until 2017. During her time there, she focused on expanding the orchestra's partnerships with local school and arts organizations, School of the Deaf and the Blind, Ballet Spartanburg, and Spartanburg Day School, and launched a new chamber music series featuring the orchestra's principal players as well as co-commissioning a new percussion concerto by Australian composer Sean O'Boyle for Evelyn Glennie.

In 2014, Symphony Tacoma announced the appointment of Ioannides as its next music director, the first female conductor to be named to the post, with an initial contract of 5 years. During the 2020–2021 season as a result of the COVID-19 pandemic, Ioannides developed extensive digital content, including the production of Symphony Tacoma's 'Encore Series', a curated selection of online performances founded on work from her previous six seasons with the orchestra. Following an initial contract extension through the 2023–2024 season, in February 2024, Symphony Tacoma announced a further extension of Ioannides' contract as music director through the 2028–2029 season. However, in March 2025, the orchestra announced the conclusion of Ioannides' tenure as music director of Symphony Tacoma to be at the close of the 2025–2026 season, two seasons earlier than the February 2024 announcement time. In July 2026, Symphony Tacoma granted Ioannides the title of music director laureate, upon the conclusion of her tenure as its music director.

In 2018, Ioannides became the founding artistic director of the Cascade Conducting Institute, a week-long international masterclass held in partnership with Symphony Tacoma. Since 2016, she has coached conductors and led new music performances for the Curtis Institute of Music.

== Advocacy ==
Ioannides is an advocate for new music, with a particular focus on collaborative projects and multimedia projects. She has conducted over forty world premieres, including works by Stephen Paulus, Marie Samuelsson, Hannah Lash, Richard Danielpour, Dario Marianelli, and Claudio Constantini.

In her work with orchestras around the world, she is a spokesperson for more diverse composers and guest artists, as well as supporting emerging women and minority conductors in her role as coach and mentor. Ioannides's work is also marked by her collaborations beyond the music industry. A notable example of such cross-sector projects is "Fire Mountain" (2017), a collaboration with the National Parks Association, Tacoma's Museum of Glass, and Hilltop Artists. The piece was first presented in a double premiere with music by Daniel Ott and film by Derek Klein.

In 2016, Ioannides produced a new multimedia art film to accompany Milhaud's Creation du Monde, directed by Brad McCombs, using artworks selected from the Cincinnati Art Museum, international collections, and Ioannides' own paintings. This film was also shown at Cincinnati's Summermusik Festival.

== Recordings ==
Ioannides's first commercial recording was released in 2008. She conducted violinist Lara St. John and the Royal Philharmonic Orchestra in works by John Corigliano, Matthew Hindson, and Franz Liszt. In 2019, she recorded works by Marie Samuelsson, including the Love Trilogy and Airborne Lines and Rumbles, with the Malmö Symphony and Nordic Chamber Orchestra.

As part of the 2021 Cascade Conducting program, Ioannides enabled six composers in the Pacific Northwest to have their works performed and recorded by Symphony Tacoma musicians and conducted by young international conductors.

== Honors and awards ==
Ioannides and her work have been recognized through a multitude of honors and awards, including:

- 2021 LAO Futures Fund supporting "Eternal Light"
- 2020 NEA "Composer in the Community" with David Ludwig
- 2018 Women's Philharmonic Advocacy for Hannah Lash's "In Hopes of Finding the Sun"
- 2017 Delegate at the World Culture Summit in Abu Dhabi
- Spartanburg County Proclamation: "Sarah Ioannides Day"
- 2016 NEA Daniel Ott's "Fire-Mountain" with Symphony Tacoma
- 2016 Tacoma City Proclamation: "Sarah Ioannides Day"
- NEA ArtWorks Spartanburg
- Women Conductors Grant from LAO
- National Endowment for the Arts Panelist for the U.S. Government
- Bruno Walter Assistant Conductor Chair by the Bruno Walter Foundation
- JoAnn Falletta Award for most promising female conductor
- Leed Conducting Competition Kenneth Tyghe Memorial Prize/Audience Prize

== Personal life ==
Ioannides married Scott Hartman, a trombonist and professor at Yale University, in 2005. They have three children. The family spent a decade dividing their time amongst three states while Ioannides was music director of the El Paso Symphony, Spartanburg Philharmonic Orchestra, and Symphony Tacoma. Ioannides is a distance runner and has run a marathon and several half marathons. Ioannides is a descendant of the Maltese family and the eighth generation of violinists, composers, and conductors, which includes composer Antonio Nani.

Cultural offices
Preceded by Gürer Aykal	Music Director, El Paso Symphony Orchestra; 2005–2011	Succeeded by Bohuslav Rattay
Preceded by William Scott	Music Director, Spartanburg Philharmonic Orchestra; 2005–2017	Succeeded by Stefan Sanders
Preceded by Harvey Felder	Music Director, Symphony Tacoma; 2014–2026	Succeeded by (post vacant)
