= Wang Ying (composer) =

Chinese composer (born 1976)

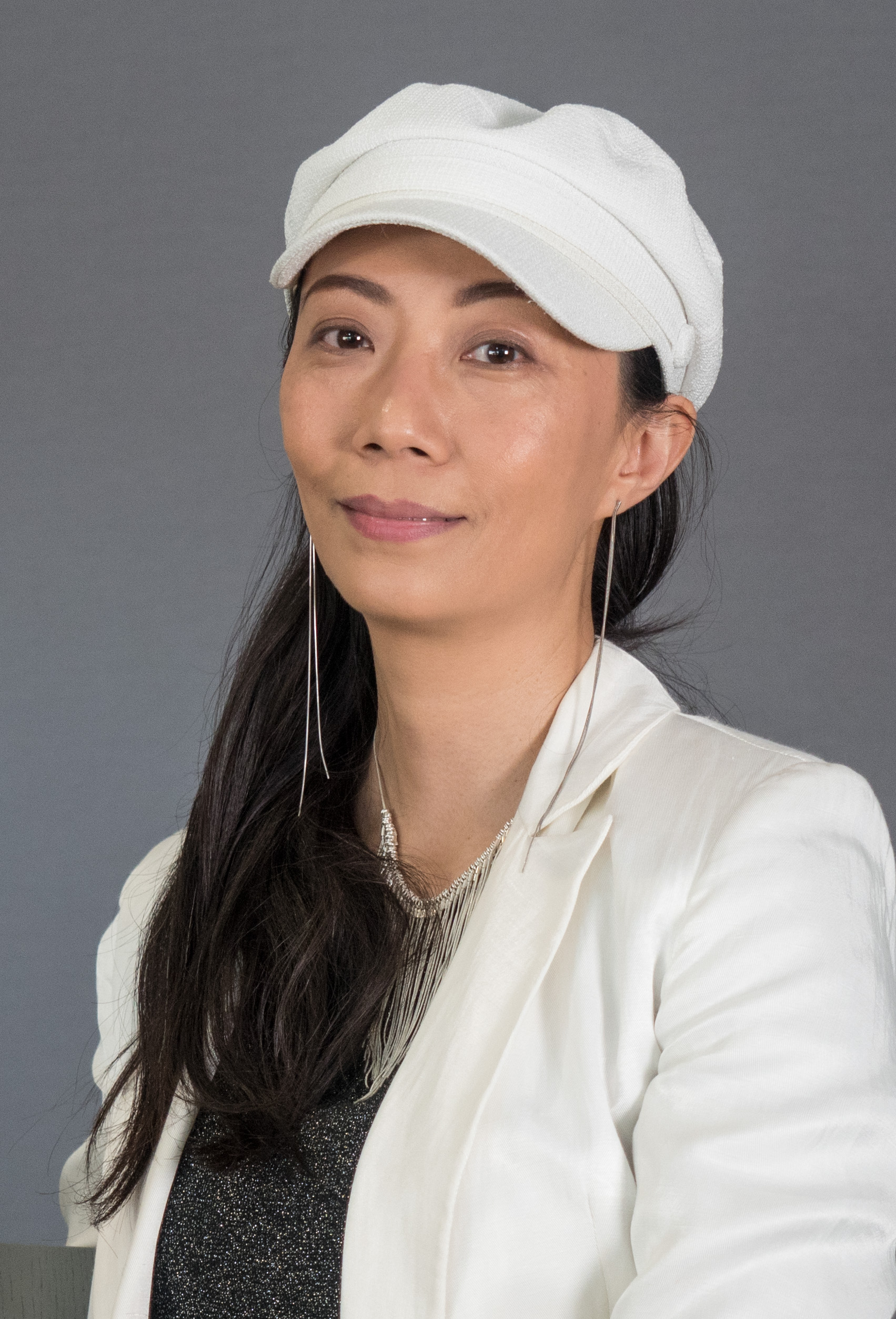
Wang Ying in 2025

Wang Ying (Chinese: 王穎; pinyin: Wáng Yǐng; born September 10, 1976) is a Chinese-born composer based in Berlin.

== Life ==
Wang Ying was born in Shanghai, China. She began her musical education at the age of four, receiving piano lessons from her father, the composer Wang Xilin. At the Shanghai Conservatory of Music she studied composition with Prof. Gang Chen, Prof. Daqun Jia and instrumentation with Yang Liqing, completing a bachelor's degree with honors in 2002. In 2003 she moved to Cologne, Germany for graduate studies with York Höller at the Hochschule für Musik und Tanz Köln. From 2008 she studied electronic composition with Michael Beil and composition with Johannes Schöllhorn and Rebecca Saunders. In 2010 she completed a master's degree in contemporary music at the Frankfurt University of Music and Performing Arts while working with Helmut Lachenmann. At the Cologne Conservatory she studied for the Diplom and concert exam in composition as well as one in electronic composition – both were completed in 2011. In 2011 she was chosen to study at the "Cursus de composition et d’informatique musicale" at IRCAM in Paris, where she completed courses with Mauro Lanza, Philippe Leroux and Ivan Fedele, graduating in 2012.

Wang's compositions often include elements of the traditional Chinese music and western popular music. She also integrates electronics, electronic instruments such as minimoog and visuals in her works. Their thematic basis is quite often political.

Her works have been performed in China, Germany, France, Finland, Poland, Sweden, Austria and the United States. She has collaborated with various ensembles such as Avanti! (Helsinki), the Ensemble Modern (Frankfurt), Ensemble Mossaik (Berlin), Musica Assoluta (Hannover), Ensemble Reflektor (Hannover), Ensemble Alternance (Paris), Cassatt Quartet (New York), IzM Ensemble Frankfurt, Norrbotten NEO (Sweden), Ensemble United Berlin, Ensemble Atlas (Amsterdam), Klangforum Wien, œsterreichisches ensemble fuer neue musik and others. Her works have been performed by famous orchestras such as Gürzenich Orchestra (Cologne), Tokyo Sinfonietta, SWR Symphony Orchestra, Essen Philharmonie, Vienna Radio Symphony Orchestra, Deutsche Radio Philharmonie, Brandenburger Symphoniker.

Wang has been awarded the prizes Heidelberger Künstlerinnenpreis in 2017, Irino-Prize for chamber orchestra in 2014 and the Production Award of Giga-Hertz-Preis in 2013. She has received commissions from various festivals including Eclat Festival, Now! Festival, Heroines of Sound and others. She has given lectures in electronic music and her own compositions at the Shanghai Conservatory of Music, Central Conservatory of Music Beijing and Conservatory of Music Wuhan, Sichuan Conservatory of Music and University of Music Weimar.

In 2012 she became the second female composer to win the Biennial Brandenburg Symphony Composition Competition (the first being Chihchun Chi-sun Lee in 2005), winning the 5th Brandenburg Biennale.

== Selected list of works ==
=== Orchestra ===
- Phantasmagoria for orchestra (2008)
- Steel, Steam, Storm for orchestra (2008–2009)
- Fusion for orchestra (2011)
- Unermüdlich strömend, nahezu transparent for orchestra (2013)
- Schwarzes Holz for orchestra and tárogató (2014/15)
- LTD 1 for orchestra (2016/2017)
- 528 HZ 8va for orchestra and electronics (2021/2022)

=== Chamber orchestra ===
- Nur Ich for gu zheng, pipa, sheng, percussion, piano, violin, viola and violoncello (2009)
- Fokus-Axis for ensemble (2010)
- Glissadulation for ensemble and electronics (2013/2015)
- ROBOTICtack for alto, ensemble and electronics (2017)
- Black Hole, Big Bang (2018) for ensemble, electronics and interactive visual arts
- MusicBox for ensemble, electronics and film (2018)
- Schmutz for ensemble, electronics and 4 megaphones (tape) (2019)
- DELETE [ sic! ] for female voice and ensemble (2021)
- DIS - A. (Appearance) for ensemble and video (2021)
- Re:Wilding for chamber orchestra and electronics (2020)

=== Vocal music ===
- Echo aus den Vergangenheit I for 2 Choirs (1999)
- Die Gasse im Regen for speaker, flute, harp and mixed choir (1999)
- Ursprung des Klangs for choir and 3 percussionists (2004)
- Pie-R-Rot for voices and ensemble (2010)
- F-Ü-I-D for baritone and piano (2010)
- GAWA for female voice and Chinese ocarina (2021)
- Illuminations 3 Songs for female voice, piano and electronics (2022)

=== Chamber opera ===
- Wilde Gräser for mezzo-soprano, tenor, baritone, choir and ensemble (1999–2000)
- Lorry 39 for mezzo-soprano, video, ensemble and electronics (2022)

=== Chamber music ===
- Illusion for sheng and string quartet (2000)
- Schatten, durch den Klang I for organ and drums (2005)
- Moment der Kontemplation for bass clarinet, accordion and tamtam (2006)
- Durchsichtiges Lied for oboe and harp (2006)
- Schatten, durch den Klang II for Oboe Duo (2007)
- Begrenzt-Unbegrenzt for saxophone, violin, viola and percussion (2008)
- Durchsichtiges Lied 2nd version for alto flute and harp (2006/2009)
- Compass quartet for clarinet, horn, violoncello, piano and electronics (2009/2010)* Cycle for piano trio (2011)
- Tun•Tu for baritone saxophone, electronic sounds and live electronics (2012)
- Build up für Shakuhachi, Sho, Sheng, Pipa, Sarnaghi, Koto and Guzheng (2012)
- Deconstruct-Reconstruction for piano, timpani, leap motion and electronics(2015)
- Unlinked Innocence for accordion, clarinet and electronics (2016)
- Snapshot for erhu, piano and electronics (2017)
- ¾ - Trio in the Cube for Pipa, Percussion and GuZheng (2021)
- Copyleft for string quartet (2021)

=== Solo pieces ===
- Imprint – Blue for piano (2011)
- Focus-Exchange for bass clarinet and electronics(2015)
- A for solo performers with amplified tarogato and live electronics (2017)
- NOCTILUCENT for solo trumpet and video (2017)
- Virulent for solo flute (2020)
