= Ida Lundén =

Swedish composer and jazz pianist

Ida Johanna Lundén (born 1971) is a contemporary Swedish composer and jazz pianist. She has specialized mainly in electronic and chamber music but has also written works for theatre and film. She has become known for her unusual combination of instruments such as viola and potatoes or double bass and bass singers.

== Life ==
Born on 20 August 1971 in Nylöse, Gothenburg, Lundén studied jazz piano and improvisation at Gothenburg's Academy of Music and Drama. From the mid-1990s, she studied composition, first under Sven-David Sandström at Gotland School of Music Composition in Visby, then under Pär Lindgren and Bent Sörensen at the Royal College of Music, Stockholm, and from 2001 to 2002 under Mathias Spahlinger at the Hochschule für Musik Freiburg. In 2005, she earned a post-graduate diploma in music composition from the Royal College of Music.

In 2016, Lundén's "Songs my mothers taught me" for piano and cello was nominated for the Nordic Council Music Prize. It was qualified as a "breathtakingly beautiful and peculiar work that feels as familiar as it does strange, and as primordial as it does new".

Lundén's sister Sara (born 1970) is a singer, musician and performance artist.
