= Mirjam Tally =

Estonian composer (born 1976)

Mirjam Tally (born 28 November 1976 in Tallinn) is an Estonian composer.

In 2003 she graduated from Estonian Academy of Music and Theatre. In 1998-2004 she was a freelance program host in the classical music channel Klassikaraadio. 2003-2006 she was an editor for music magazine Muusika.

Since 2006 she lives in Visby, Sweden.

Since 2000, she is a member of Estonian Composers' Union. Since 2007 she is a member of Swedish Society of Composers.

Awards:

- 2004: Heino Eller Music Prize
- 2008: Christ Johnson-priset
