= The Gothenburg Combo =

Swedish classical guitar duo

The Gothenburg Combo is a classical guitar duo from Sweden. It has toured and performed in the US, China, Germany, France, the Netherlands, Spain, Estonia, Chile, Peru, Bolivia, Norway, Denmark, Finland, Albania and Sweden.

Their repertoire contains contemporary, classical and popular music. They have performed very virtuous pieces by the likes of Henrik Strindberg, Steve Reich and Mauricio Kagel. Their close collaborations with modern composers have resulted in several world premieres of contemporary pieces. They have premiered works by composers such as Miklós Maros and Kim Hedås. They have also composed and performed several compositions of their own. They have released four albums.

== Musicians ==
- David Hansson - Guitar
- Thomas Hansy - Guitar

== CDs ==
- Hausmusik (2005)
- Soundscapes (2007)
- La Vida Bréve (2008)
- Skeches of the World (2010)
