= Uppsala tonsättartävling =

Swedish competition for young composers

Uppsala tonsättartävling (Swedish for "Uppsala Composition Competition") is a Swedish competition for young (up to 35 years old) composers organized by Musik i Uppland (the public concert organizer owned by the county council of Uppsala County in Sweden). The competition has been realized in 2010, 2012 and 2014. Right now it is not clear if Uppsala tonsättartävling will take place a fourth time.

The composers send in works for sinfonietta and the works are then judged by a jury. Six works are chosen for a final round where they are performed in public by the professional chamber orchestra Uppsala kammarorkester. The winning work is then performed by eight other Swedish orchestras. The first, second and third placed composers are awarded money. These prize winners were Jonas Valfridsson, Andrea Tarrodi and Andreas Zhibaj in 2010, Daniel Fjellström, Ansgar Beste and Jonas Olofsson in 2012, and Matthew Peterson, David Riebe and Molly Kien in 2014. The head of jury was Daniel Börtz in 2010 and 2012 and Sven-David Sandström in 2014.
