= Wang Xilin =

Chinese composer (born 1936)

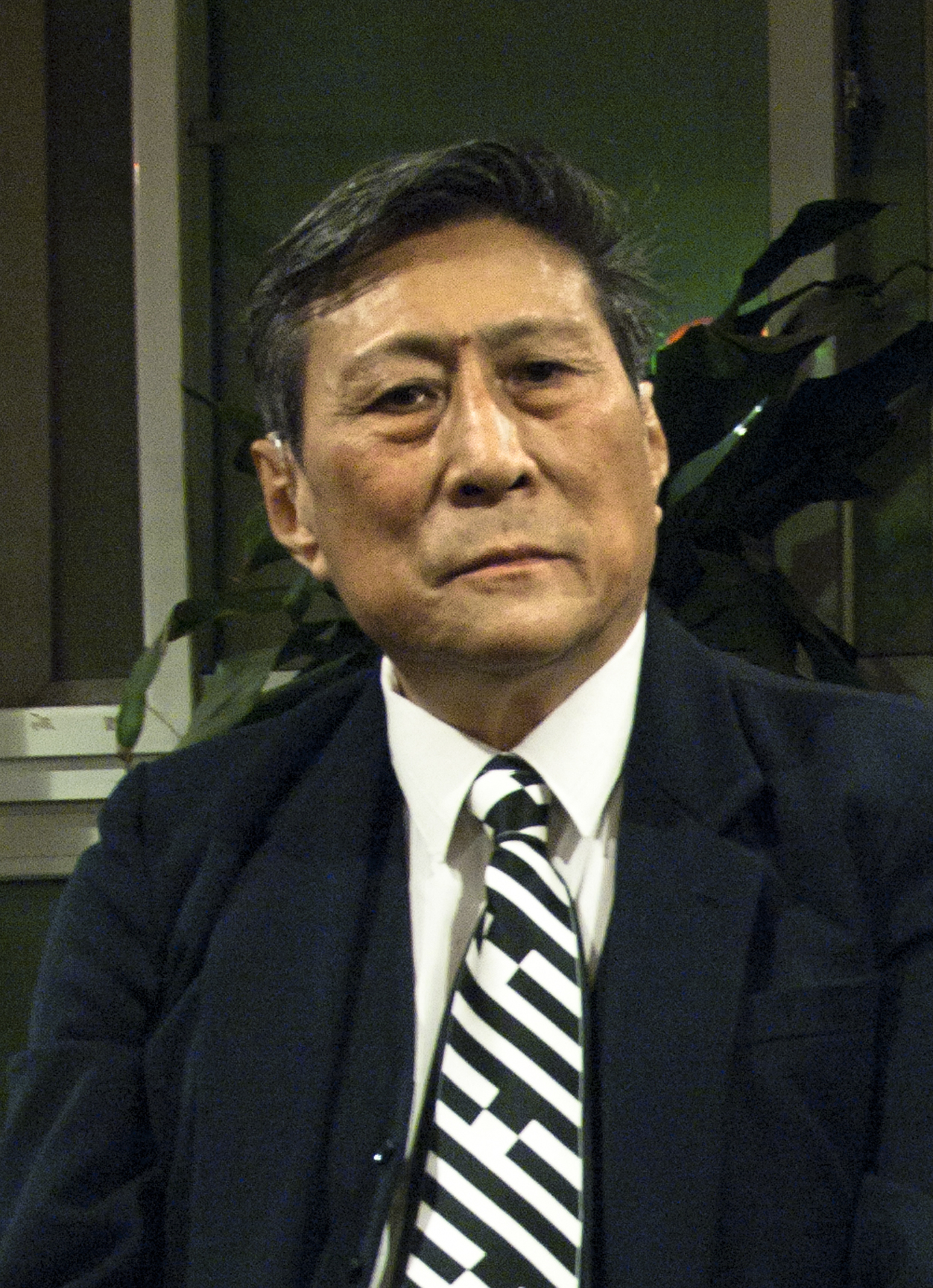
Wang Xilin

Wang Xilin (Chinese: 王西麟; pinyin: Wáng Xīlín; born December 13, 1936) is a Chinese composer.

== Life ==
Wang was born in Kaifeng, Henan province and spent his childhood in Pingliang in the Gansu Province. When he was 12 he taught himself music theory, the huqin, accordion, brass instruments, as well as instrumentation and arranging. His first exposure to Western music was in 1955 when he began studying conducting at a music school run by the People's Liberation Army Central Committee. He studied theory and piano at a teachers college in Shanghai and graduated from the Shanghai Conservatory in 1962 where he studied composition with Liu Zhuang, Ding Shande, and Qu Wei.

While still a student, Wang composed his String Quartet No. 1 (1961) and the first movement of his Symphony No. 1 (op. 2, 1962, this was his graduation work) which led to his appointment in 1963 as composer-in-residence of the Central Radio Symphony Orchestra. Later in 1963 there were political changes in China under Chairman Mao Zedong which led to a crackdown on Western music, especially that of the 20th century. Wang gave a two-hour public speech in 1964 criticising such policies, which led to him being stripped of his position with the Central Radio Symphony Orchestra. He was banished to Shanxi Province until 1977. From 1964 to 1978, Wang was forced to work as a laborer in Datong, spent 6 months in a mental asylum, and was imprisoned during the Cultural Revolution. As a result of being beaten, he lost a tooth as well as about 20% of his hearing.

In the late 1970s he started conducting again, working with the Southeast Shanxi Song and Dance Ensemble in Changzhi. After the Cultural Revolution he returned to Beijing and started to compose again. He became well known for his Yunnan Tone Poem (1963), for which he was awarded the highest prize given by the Chinese government in 1981. It has been performed in many countries. He also won the same award in 2000 for his song Spring Rain and in 2004 for Three Symphonic Frescoes – Legend of Sea.

After 1980 Wang was able to study scores of modern Western composers and discovered the music of Béla Bartók, Igor Stravinsky, Arnold Schoenberg, Krzysztof Penderecki, Alfred Schnittke, and Witold Lutosławski. He has also been greatly influenced by Russian music, especially that of Dmitri Shostakovich, and by Chinese folk music.

Wang's compositions include chamber and vocal music, 9 symphonies, 2 symphonic suites, 2 symphonic cantatas, 3 symphonic overtures, a choral concerto, and a violin concerto. He has also provided the music for 40 films and television productions. His works have been performed in Australia, Austria, China, France, Germany, Macau, Switzerland, and the United States. His 6th Symphony was written for the 2008 Summer Olympics. His Ninth Symphony, 'China Requiem', was premiered on 13 December 2015 by conductor Tang Muhai and the China National Symphony Orchestra. He is Composer in Residence of the Beijing Symphony Orchestra.

His daughter, Wang Ying (王穎), born in Shanghai in 1976, is also a composer.

In 2023, Wang appeared in the documentary Man in Black, directed by Wang Bing. It premiered at the 2023 Cannes Film Festival in the Special Screenings section.

== Works ==
- Op. 1 String Quartet No. 1 (1961)
- Op. 2 Symphony No. 1 (1962,1963)
- Op. 3 Symphonic Suite “Yunnan Tone Poems” (1963)

I Spring rain in a tea plantation
II Along the path of a mountain village
III Night song
IV Torch Festival

- Op. 4 Cantata of Zang Fortified Village (1964)
- Op. 5 Little Suite “Planting trees” (1972)
- Op. 6 Opera “Song of Red Tassels” (1973)
- Op. 7 Symphony of Shangdang Bangzi (a local drama in Shanxi Province) “Sha Jia Bang” (1974)
- Op. 8 Symphonic Chorus “January 8th” (1977)
- Op. 9 Chinese Opera of Shangdang Bangzi “Red Lantern Shines” (1977)
- Op. 10 Symphonic Chorus “Falling of the Giant Star – in Memory of Chairman Mao” (1977)
- Op. 11 Dance Music “Dancing Saber” (1978)
- Op. 12 Symphony No. 2 (1979)
- Op. 13 Five Art Songs (1979)
- Op. 14 Chamber Suite “Musical Images of Taihang Mountains” (1979)
- Op. 15 Brass Quintet “Prints Anthology” (1979)
- Op. 16 Chamber Suite “Customs of Erhai”
- Op. 17 Two Chamber Pieces “Sending to the South” (1981)
- Op. 18 Movie Music “A Small boat” (1982)
- Op. 19 Symphonic Suite “Impression of Taihang Mountain” (1982)
- Op. 20 Movie Music “Sail off next time” (1983)
- Op. 21 Symphonic Overture “Poem of China” for piano, chorus and orchestra (1984)
- Op. 22 Two Symphonic Poems: 1. Motion 2. Chant, dedicated to Shostakovich on the 10th anniversary of his death (1985)
- Op. 23 Elegy for soprano and orchestra – Impression of Qu Yuan's “Calling the Soul” and “Questioning the Heanven” (1986)
- Op. 24 Movie Music “The Last Winter Day” (1987)
- Op. 25 Music for Piano and 23 String Instruments (1988)
- Op. 26 Symphony No. 3 (1990)
- Op. 27 Three Ancient Melodies for Pipa and 25 String Instruments (1992)
- Op. 28 Two Pieces Written for Lu Xun's “Casting A Sword” (1993). 1. “Song of the Man in Black” for a singer and chamber music ensemble. 2. “Three Heads Dancing in the Cauldron”, chorus without accompaniment
- Op. 29 Concerto for Violin and Orchestra (1995)
- Op. 30 Shang I (Die Young) for a singer and a septet of folk musical instruments (1996)
- Op. 31 Symphonic Overture “For the Impetus of Points and Lines” I (1996)
- Op. 32 Symphonic Overture “For the Impetus of Points and Lines” II (1997)
- Op. 33 Four Choruses (1997)
- Op. 34 Symphonic Chorus “Guoshang – Hymns on Spirits of State Warriors Slain in War” for baritone, chorus and orchestra (1997)
- Op. 35 Five Symphonic Frescoes “Legend of the Sea” for solo, chorus and orchestra, written for the 2200th anniversary of the founding of Fuzhou City (1998)
- Op. 36 Shanxi Style Suite for piano (1998)
- Op. 37 Four Pieces Based on Tang and Song Dynasties’ Poems for orchestra with recitation (1999)
- Op. 38 Symphony No. 4 (1999)
- Op. 39 Concerto for Violin and Orchestra (revised version) (2000)
- Op. 40 Symphony No. 5 for 23 strings (2001)
- Op. 41 Quartet for clarinet, violin, cello and piano (2002)
- Op. 42 Octet
- Op. 43 Adagio for string quartet
- Op. 44 Symphonic Ballad
- Op. 45 Symphony No. 6, "Song of Life" (2004)
- Op. 46 Shang II
- Op. 47 Duet for two marimbas
- Op. 48 Three Pieces for Symphony Orchestra
- Op. 49 Adagio – Shang III for 46 strings (2006)
- Op. 50 Shang II (2006)
- Op. 51 Shang III (2008, in memory of Chinese conductor Li Delun)
- Op. 52 Symphony No.7, "He Yi Zhuang Cheng" for Piano, Choir and Orchestra (2007, dedicated to the Shanghai Conservatory)
- Op. 53 Symphonic fantasy (2008, committed by 2008's Shanghai Spring International Music Festival)
- Op. 54 Symphony No.8, "Comedic Dialogue", for Sheng, Guzheng, Pipa and Chamber Orchestra (2009, commissioned by Young Europe Classic Festival, Germany)
- Op. 55 Symphonic Suite,'Taigu Folks'
- Op. 60 Symphony No.9 "China Requiem" (2015)
- Op. 62 Symphony No.10, for soprano solo and orchestra (2019)

== Bibliography ==
- Robison, John O. Wang Xilin, Human Suffering, and Compositional Trends in Contemporary China. Richmond, California: MRI Press, 2021.
