= Thomas Jennefelt =

Swedish composer (born 1954)

Thomas Jennefelt is a Swedish composer born on April 24, 1954. His music has a strong vocal profile, from opera to choir music. Jennefelt is known as one of the most important choral composers of his generation starting with the success of his Warning to the Rich (1977) for solo baritone and mixed choir which has awarded him international acclaim. Other choral pieces include Dichterliebe (I-X) — a compendium of musical settings to Heine’s poems, famously musicalized by Schumann in his song cycle of the same title, and Villarosa sequences — a choral suite sung to an invented language based on Latin words. He has also written works for chamber and larger orchestras, and his music has been performed in Swedish halls as well as internationally. Among his operas The Jesters’ Hamlet and Sports&Leisure are to be mentioned.

== Biography ==
He grew up in Huddinge, a municipality in Stockholm, and his education was based at the Royal College of Music in Stockholm where he studied composition with Gunnar Bucht and Arne Mellnas from 1974 to 1980. He was part of what they called the Swedish Choral Miracle in the 1960s, a choral revolution that started with conductor Eric Ericson. Jennefelt was part of his choir, and he is associated with the composers around this movement. From 1994 to 2000, he was chairman of the Society of Swedish Composers.

== Musical style ==
Jennefelt’s music is known for his expressive use of dissonance, grandiose textures, and stress on short syllabic structures. His interest in literature and his sensitivity to vocalization make his music easy to set in dramatic stages. He has written many operas including Albert och Julia, the full-length Gycklarnas Hamret (The Jesters' Hamlet), the chamber opera Farkosten (The Vessel), set to his own libretto, and Sport och fritid (Sport & Leisure) for the Royal Swedish Opera to a libretto by Niklas Rådström. The composer’s love for drama and literature is reflected in other genres as well. His orchestral work Musik vid ett berg (Music before a Mountain) was intended to be paired with text in a melodrama setting, but ended up being an exclusive instrumental piece that still contains the intense dramatic expression.

== Awards and recognition ==
Thomas Jennefelt is a member of the Royal Swedish Academy of Music, and has been its vice president since 2004. In 2001, he was awarded the royal Litteris et Artibus medal.

== Works ==
CHAMBER MUSIC

- Friday afternoon (2007) for solo piccolo. (MIC)
- Musik till en katedralbyggare / Music to a cathedral-builder (1983–84) for flute, clarinet, violin, cello, and piano. (GE)
- Rondo (1984) for flute, clarinet, violin, and cello. (MIC)
- Svarta spår (1990) for 2 violins, 2 violas, cello, double bass. (MIC)
- Untitled (1983) for 10 electric guitars, electric bass, and drums. (Comp.)
- Yellow II (1984) for oboe solo. (Comp.)
- When the waters recede (2008) for piano trio. (MIC)

ORCHESTRA

- Desiderio (1983) (MIC)
- In rilievo (2005) (MIC)
- Musik vid ett berg (1991–92) (MIC)

CONCERTI

- Stockholm in May (2000) for trumpet and string orchestra. (MIC)

VOCAL CHAMBER MUSIC

- Albumblatt (1984) for baritone, flute, and clarinet. (MIC)
- Far vidare färdmän (1984–85) mezzo soprano, baritone, cello, and piano. (MIC)
- Grönskans resa (1984) baritone and piano trio. (MIC)
- Isarna (2003) Mezzo soprano and piano. (MIC)
- Källan i Vaucluse: 6 songs (1982) baritone & string quartet. (SR)
- Renaissance (1979) for soprano, baritone, recorder, oboe, and cembalo. (MIC)
- Strimoni volio (2001) for soprano solo. (W/C)
- Tre sånger (2007) for baritone or soprano and piano. (MIC)
- The Lady (2002) for soprano and piano. (MIC)
- Stunden, äppelträdet och livet (2007) for mezzo soprano and cello. (MIC)
- återkomsten (1995) for voice and piano. (MIC)

VOCAL AND ORCHESTRA

- Den gömda källan (1997) for mezzo soprano, mixed choir, percussion, piano, and string orchestra. (GE)
- Gömmarna /The Shelters (1997) for baritone and orchestra. (MIC)
- In other words (2008) SATB soli mixed choir and baroque orchestra. (MIC)
- Längs radien (1986) for soprano, mezzo soprano, tenor and baritone soli, and orchestra. (MIC)
- Musik till en stad (2023-2024) for soprano and orchestra.

CHOIR

- 3 etyder tillägnade det Patafysiska kollegiet (1985) for mixed choir. (GE)
- Av någon sedd (2008) for mixed choir and piano. (GE)
- La città dolente (2000) for mixed choir and 2 pianos. (MIC)
- Danser på stranden / Dances on the beach (2003) for mixed choir and sinfonietta. (MIC)
- Dichterliebe I-X (1990) for mixed choir with SATTBarB soli. (W/C)
- Drei Legenden (2001) for mixed choir. (MIC)
- Fem motetter / Five motets for mixed choir:
1. Dagar skall komma (1984) with organ. (GE)
2. Bön (1984) (GE)
3. Ni skall söka mig (1984) with organ. (GE)
4. Du som är min Herre (1984) (GE)
5. Hosianna (1984) with organ. (GE)
- Gesänge am ersten Abend des Krieges / Songs on the first night of the war (2003) for mixed choir. (GE)
- Musik till en stor kyrka: att vila till / Music for a big church: for tranquility (1990) for mixed choir. (GE)
- Människor är vackra när de sover (from “Den gömda källan”) (1997) for mixed choir. (GE)
- Noviori ani (2004) for treble choir. (MIC)
- O Domine (1983) for mezzo soprano solo and mixed choir. (GE)
- O Hoffnung (2008) for 10 voices SSSSAATTBB. (MIC)
- On&on&on&on&on (2000) for 8 voices (SSAATTBB). (GE)
- Platt buk med duk (1982) for mixed choir a cappella. (GE)
- Sostenuto (1995) for mixed Scanian choir. (MIC)
- Stig Dagerman, Isaac Newton och Gud (2005) for mixed choir. (Comp)
1. Fallandet
2. Kärleksrummet
3. Processionen
- Sången och gången (2000) for soprano, mixed choir, flute, 2 baritone saxophones, signal horn orchestra, and frog sounds. (Comp.)
- Tableau vivantes (2002) for mixed choir. (MIC)
- Triumf att finnas till (1992) for SAB choir and 2 pianos. (GE)
- Two Anthems (1997) for mixed choir. (W/C)
- Ty han låter sin sol gå upp (1983) for mixed choir. (GE)
- Villarosa-sekvenser/Villarosa Sequences:
1. Aleidi floriasti (1993) for mixed choir. (W/C)
2. Saoveri indamflavi (1993) for male choir. (W/C)
3. Villarosa sarialdi (1993) for mixed choir. (W/C)
4. Strimoni volio (2001) for soprano solo. (W/C)
5. Claviante brilioso (1996) for mixed choir. (W/C)
6. Virita criosa (1996) for treble choir. (W/C)
7. Vinamintra elitavi (1994–95) for mixed choir. (W/C)
- Warning to the Rich (1977) for baritone solo and mixed choir. (GE)
- övervintrarna (1999) for mixed choir and 9 trumpets. (SR)

OPERA

- Albert och Julia: Radio opera (1987) for soli, mixed choir, and orchestra. (SR)
- Farkosten (The Vessel): Chamber opera (1993–94) for 4 soli and flute, clarinet, trombone, percussion, piano, 2 violins, viola, cello, and double bass. (MIC)
- Gycklarnas Hamlet (The Jester’s Hamlet) Opera in two acts (1987–89) 8 soli, and orchestra. (MIC)
- I väntan... (1995) Dramatic scene for 18 women voices and 2 pianos. (SR)
- Meteorologen (1997) Dramatic scene for tenor and percussion. (SR)
- Sport & fritid [Sports & Leisure (2000-2002)] Opera in two acts for 8 soli, choir and orchestra. (MIC)
- å: en musikdramatisk scen (2004) Dramatic scene for soprano, mezzosoprano, 3 baritones, and piano. (Comp.)

PUBLISHERS

- Comp.: Contact composer
- GE: Gehrmans Musikförlag, Stockholm
- MIC: Swedish Music Information Centre, Stockholm
- SR: Sveiges Radio, Stockholm
- W/C: Warner/Chappell Scand., c/o Gehrmans

CD RECORDINGS

- Dichterliebe I-X. PSCD 68
- Bön. BIS CD 789
- Claviante brilioso. Opus 3 CD 22012
- Fem motetter. PSCD 25
- Isarna. NYTORP 6
- Music to a cathedral-builder. PSCD 68
- Musik vid ett berg. PSCD 68
- O Domine. PSCD 44
- Strimoni violo. PRCD 2029
- Stockholm i maj. CAP 21572
- Vinamintra elitavi. BIS CD 789
- Villarosa Sequences 1-7. PSCD 2029
- Villarosa sarialdi. EE80
- Warning to the Rich. PSCD 68
