= Sonanza Ensemble =

Swedish musical ensemble

Sonanza Ensemble is a Swedish ensemble focused on contemporary music. Jan Risberg is the conductor and leader.

== Musicians ==
- Anna Lindal, violin I
- Josef Cabrales Alin, violin II
- Elsbeth Berg, viola
- Ewa Rydström, cello
- Mikael Karlsson, double bass
- Mats Widlund, piano
- Ann-Sofi Klingberg, piano
- Peter Rydström, flute
- Mats Wallin, clarinet
- Joakim Anterot, percussion
- Jan Risberg, conductor

== Repertoire (selection) ==
- Arnold Schoenberg - Pierrot Lunaire, Op. 21
- Per Nørgård, Prelude to breaking
- Anders Eliasson, Senza Risposte, Fogliame
- Arne Mellnäs, Gardens
- Magnus Lindberg, ...de Tartuffe, je crois... , Ur
- Anders Nilsson, Reflections I-III, Divertimento
- George Crumb, Eleven Echoes of Autumn
- Daniel Börtz, Ett porträtt
- Henrik Strindberg, Cheap Thrills
- Per Mårtensson, a postcard signed G.B.
- Mikael Edlund, the lost Jugglery
- Lars Ekström, Garden of Ice
- Đuro Živković, Le cimitière marin, Around the candle lights, Eclat de larme
- Pär Frid, Déja vú, over and over again
- Benjamin Staern, Nattens djupa violoncell

== Discography ==
- Contemporary Nordic Chamber Music (ACCD 1010, 1988)
- Sonanza (CAP 21382, 1991)
- Sonanza (CAP 21450, 1995)
- Unheard of - Again (PSCD 180, 2008)
- Sonanza Chamber Orch. Göran Söllscher (CAP 21514, 1996)

Participating on composer portrait cd

- Arne Mellnäs (Nocturnes) (PSCD 22, 1985)
- Thomas Jennefelt: Dichterliebe (Musik till en katedralbyggare) (PSCD 68, 1993)
- Peter Lindroth: Boxed Chamber (Grusmusikväska) (Nosag CD 146, 1993)
- Folke Rabe: Basta (Notturno) (PSCD 67, 1994)
- Lars Ekström: The Dream Age (Garden of Ice) (PSCD 122, 2001)
- Henrik Strindberg: Within Trees (Cheap Thrills) (PSCD 124, 2004)
- Henrik Strindberg: Neptune's Field (Bilder) (Promenader PROMO1, 1-2, 2017)
