= Ragnarök (Swedish band) =

Swedish progressive rock band

- Origin: Kalmar, Sweden
- Genres: Progressive rock, instrumental rock, folk rock, ambient music
- Years active: 1972–present
- Labels: Silence Records
- Members: Peter Bryngelsson; Peder Nabo; Henrik Strindberg; Staffan Strindberg; Thomas Wiegert
- Past members: Liselott Larsen; Kosta-Mats Christiansson; Dan Söderqvist; Kjell Karlgren; Ingmar Ljungström; Magnus Jarlbo; Per Andersson; Dan Jonsson; Lars Liljegren; Kent Ohlsson

Ragnarök is a Swedish prog-rock band, founded in Kalmar in 1972, by Peter Bryngelsson, Henrik Strindberg and Staffan Strindberg. Their first album was released 1976 by Silence Records.

== Members of the band ==
=== Current members ===
- Peter Bryngelsson: Guitar (1972-1983, 2003–present)
- Staffan Strindberg: Bass (1972-1978, 2003–present)
- Peder Nabo: Guitar, flute (1972-1980, 2003–present)
- Henrik Strindberg: Guitar, flute (2003–present)
- Mikael Svanevik: Drums (2017–present)

=== Past Members ===
- Henrik Strindberg: Guitar, flute (1972-1978)
- Liselott Larsen: Vocals (1972-1978)
- Kosta-Mats Christiansson: Drums (1972-1978)
- Thomas Wiegert: Drums (1978-2016)
- Dan Söderqvist: guitar (1978-1980)
- Kjell Karlgren: Saxophone, piano, keyboard, bass, vocals (1978-2002)
- Ingmar Ljungström: Synthesizer (1978-1980)
- Magnus Jarlbo: Trumpet, piano (1980–1982)
- Per Andersson: Bass (1980–1982)
- Dan Jonsson: Guitar (1982–1983)
- Lars Liljegren: Marimba, organ (1982–1983)
- Kent Ohlsson: Vocals, guitar (1983–2002)

== Discography ==
- Ragnarök (1976)
- Fjärilar i magen (1979)
- Fata Morgana (1981)
- 3 Signs (1983)
- Well (1991)
- Path (2008)
- Live in Tokyo (2012)
