= Per Mårtensson =

Swedish composer and teacher (born 1967)

Per Mårtensson (born 1967 in Östersund) is a Swedish composer and teacher. He is artistic director and teaches composition at The Gotland School of Music Composition. In 1998 he was given membership in The Society of Swedish Composers. Mårtenssons catalog contains mainly orchestral and chamber music. He has composed music for ensembles such as Norrbotten NEO, Sonanza and Pearls Before Swine Experience. His flute concerto was awarded the Christ Johnson-price prize—the most prestigious composition price in Sweden.

== Discography ==
- Flauto con forza, PSCD 173
- the peärls before swïne experience, Caprice Records CAP21587. 1998
- String Qt 1 'Sediments of Discourse' [PhonoSuecia] PSCD 182. 2007–8
- Stenhammar Qt 'Quartetto con Forza'

== Sources ==
- Composer biography at Swedish Music
