= Adrian Knight (composer) =

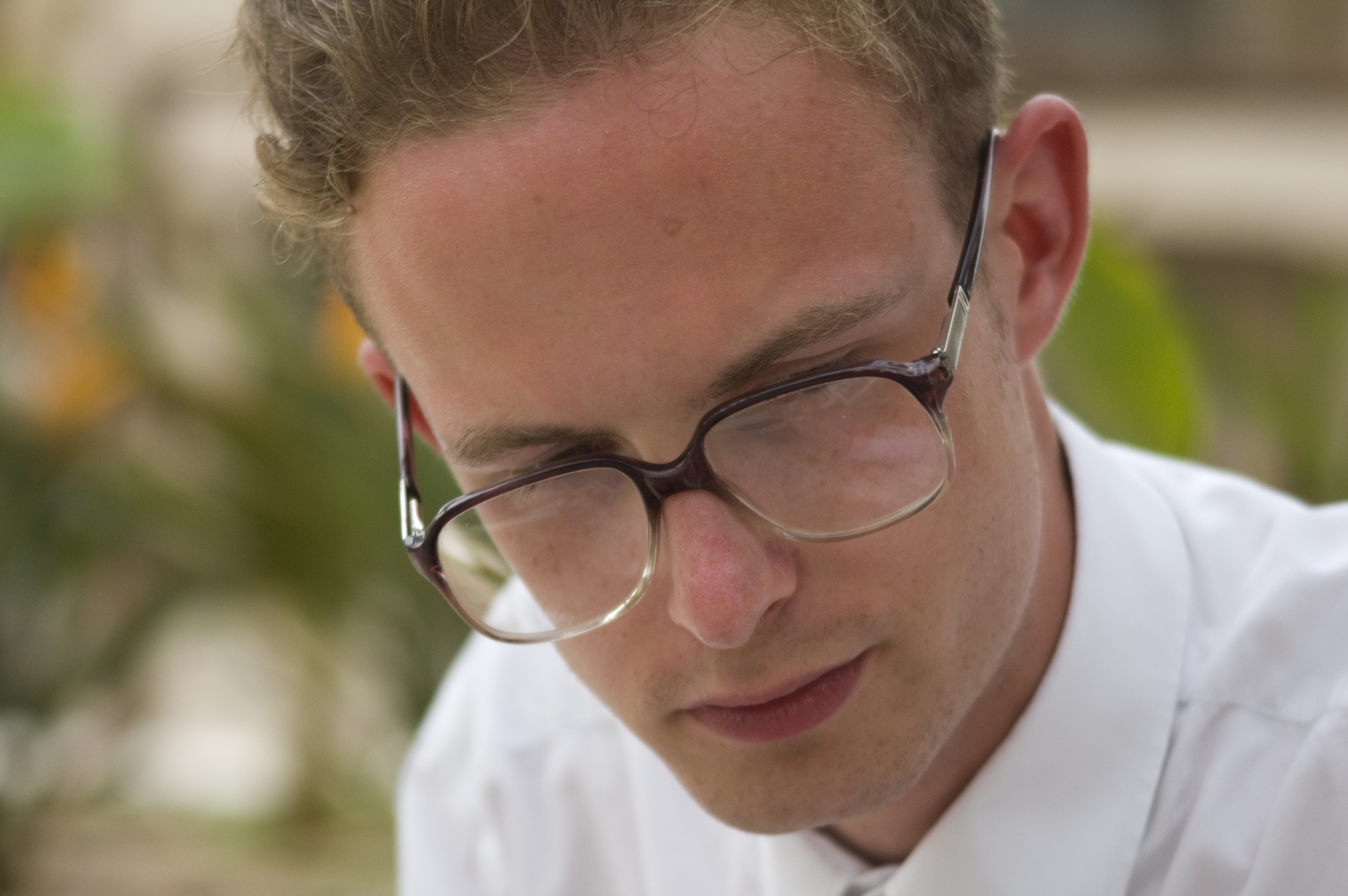

Background information
- Born: 3 January 1987 (age 39)
- Origin: Uppsala, Sweden
- Occupations: Composer, musician
- Website: adrian-knight.com

Adrian Knight (born 3 January 1987 in Uppsala, Sweden) is a Swedish composer, songwriter and musician living and working in New York City. Between 2006 and 2009 he studied with Pär Lindgren and Jesper Nordin at the Royal College of Music in Stockholm, and between 2009 and 2011 with David Lang, Christopher Theofanidis, Martin Bresnick, Ezra Laderman, and Ingram Marshall at the Yale School of Music in New Haven. He is a member of a pop group, Blue Jazz TV, as well as ambient duo Private Elevators and the experimental jazz collective Synthetic Love Dream Ensemble.

His music has been performed by the Minnesota Orchestra, the Living Earth Show, the Swedish Wind Ensemble, Red Light New Music, loadbang, Yale Philharmonia and Kungliga Musikhögskolans Symfoniorkester. In 2011, he composed the music for a Yale School of Drama production of Gertrude Stein's Doctor Faustus Lights the Lights, directed by Lileana Blain-Cruz. Since 2008, he has operated what he calls “the smallest record label in the world”, Pink Pamphlet.

Knight's works are published by Schott Music New York through their new digital initiative Project Schott New York, Svensk Musik and Pink Pamphlet. He is a member of Fylkingen and the Society of Swedish Composers.

== Works ==
- Abide with Me for piano (2007)
- Bon Voyage for guitar trio (2012)
- Comblé for orchestra (2010)
- Daedaldualism for electric guitar, synthesizer and live electronics (2007)
- Dead in the Water for bass flute and electronics (2014)
- Death of Paneloux for piano and fixed electronics (2009)
- Doctor Faustus Lights the Lights for actors, chorus and prerecorded tracks (2011)
- Family Man for electric guitar and percussion (2011-2012)
- Humble Servant for percussion (2013)
- Livet Innanför Väggarna (Life inside Walls) for 2 violas, cello and double bass (2008–2009)
- Long Gone John for fixed electronics (4ch) (2012)
- Manchester for large orchestra with electronics (2008)
- Obsessions for piano (2013-2014)
- Occultations for 3 percussionists (2015)
- Ricky Bruch for 5 micro modular synthesizers (2008)
- Ted Bundy's Requiem for fixed electronics (8ch) (2011)
- The Dividing Line (collaboration with Laura Grey) audiovisual performance (4ch audio/4ch video) (2009–2010)
- The Ringing World for percussion, piano and double bass (2015)
- The Tears for harp and electronics (2 players) (2010)
- Till minne av for 16 solo strings (2009)
- Trio for violin/viola, violoncello, piano and live electronics (2011)
- Unruhe for 6 electric guitars with e-bows and volume pedals (2008)
- Vain Attempts for piano and fixed electronics (2ch) (2007–2008)
- Världens Undergång for fixed electronics (4ch) (2009)

== Discography ==
=== Solo releases ===
- On the Prowl Again (Galtta) (2016)
- Obsessions (Irritable Hedgehog) (2016)
- Routine Job (Dig That Treasure Recordings) (2014)
- Fly By Night (Pink Pamphlet) (2014)
- Pictures of Lindsey (Galtta Media) (2014)
- Cheap Love (Pink Pamphlet) (2014)
- Cocktail Culture (Pink Pamphlet) (2013)
- Doctor Faustus Lights the Lights (Pink Pamphlet) (2013)
- Death of Pianos (Pink Pamphlet) (2012)
- Night Flight (Pink Pamphlet) (2012)
- Time of My Life (Pink Pamphlet) (2011)
- Världens undergång (Pink Pamphlet) (2009)
- Ricky Bruch Album (Pink Pamphlet) (2008)

=== With Blue Jazz TV ===
- Blue Jazz TV: Assholes (Galtta Media) (2015)
- Blue Jazz TV: Quarterly (Pink Pamphlet) (2013)
- Blue Jazz TV: Love Child EP (Self-released) (2013)
- Blue Jazz TV: Pierced Cony Lanky Bolo (Self-released) (2013)
- Blue Jazz TV: Blue Jazz TV (Pink Pamphlet) (2012)

=== Other collaborations ===
- The Living Earth Show's Andy Meyerson: My Side of the Story (Slashsound) (2016)
- Private Elevators: First Feelings (Perfect Wave) (2014)
- Synthetic Love Dream: Synthetic Love Dream (Galtta Media) (2014)
- The Living Earth Show: High Art (Innova) (2013)
