= Benjamin Staern =

Swedish composer

Benjamin Staern (born 6 December 1978) is a Swedish composer. He was born in Gothenburg, the son of Gunnar Staern.

== Education ==
Staern studied in his childhood cello, piano and percussion at the local music school in Malmö. During his studies in musicology at Lund University and before he felt that composition proved to be an interesting path to pursue. The following year he was accepted at the composition department at Musikhögskolan in Malmö, where he studied during the years 1998 to 2005 with professors Rolf Martinsson, Hans Gefors, Kent Olofsson (electronic music), Björn-Tryggve Johansson (instrumentation and counterpoint), Per Mårtensson and Lars Sandberg. During his masters his main professor was Luca Francesconi.

He was awarded a Diploma of Fine Arts and Music at the latter mentioned academy.

== Career ==
Staern's music has been performed at festivals for new music, such as Ung Nordisk Musik, Stockholm New Music and Sirenfestivalen in Gothenburg. In August 2006, his work The Threat of War was performed twice by the Royal Stockholm Philharmonic Orchestra in Stockholm Concert Hall, conducted by Michael Christie.

Staern also received grants from the Swedish Royal Musical Academy, Helge Ax: son Johnson, Annik och Lars Leander, Rosenborg/Gehrmans composition study scholarship and STIM.

== New European Ensemble residency ==
Following an invitation from New European Ensemble's artistic director, Christian Karlsen, Benjamin Staern became the first composer-in-residence of The Netherlands-based group. He has up till now written two large works for them Tranströmersånger and the chamber symphony Bells and Waves. The residency is said to lead to 3-4 works. Bells and Waves was awarded - Most Significant Chamber Work of the Year - by the Swedish Music Publisher's Association in November 2011.

== Selection of works ==
- The Threat of War (1999–2000, rev. 01) for symphony orchestra
- Muramaris (2000) for fifteen solo string instruments
- Colour wandering (2002) for ten brass musicians
- Yellow skies (2003) for alto flute
- Endast luft och brus (2004–05) for tuba and live electronics
- Sacrificio (2004–05) for tuba, live electronics and symphony orchestra
- Confrontation (2006) for trumpet solo and brass quintet
- Jubilate (2008) for symphony orchestra
- Tranströmersånger (Tranströmer Settings) (2009/10) for alto and ensemble
- Bells and Waves (2010) chamber symphony for large ensemble
- Worried Souls (2011) concerto for clarinet and symphony orchestra
- Godai (2012–13) concerto for orchestra
- Sånger av bländvit kärlek (Songs of Dazzling Love) (poems from misc. collections by Karin Boye) (2013) for alto and orchestra.
- Saiyah (2013–14) for two soloists, large ensemble, electronics and stage art.
- Opposing Dance for flute and guitar. (2013)
- Symphony no. 1 – Polar Vortex for symphony orchestra (2014)
- Två själar, en tanke, reflektioner (Two Souls, One Mind) for brass quintet (2014)
- Air-Spiral-Light for guitar solo, flute, clarinet, percussion, sampler/piano, violin, viola and cello (2014–16)
- Surprise!, concertino for solo trumpet and small orchestra (2015)
- Pont de la Mer, morceau du concert for horn and orchestra (2015)
- Snödrottningen (Snow Queen), after H C Andersens saga of the same name, libretto: Anelia Kadieva Jonsson, family opera in one act. (2013-16)
- Hilma - an opera about hidden art chamber opera in one act and nine tableaus about the painter Hilma af Klint, libretto: Mira Bartov, for soprano, tenor, treble voice (tape), violin, cello and piano (2018).
- Konnakol Variations. concert piece for percussion solo and winds (2019).
- Scherzo assurdo for clarinet and piano (2020).
- Pippi lyfter hästen (Pippi lifts the horse) anti-pastiche humoresque for symphony orchestra (2020).
- Rainbow: ritornello in six movements for small wind orchestra (2021).
- Symphony no. 2 – 'Through Purgatory to Paradise' for large symphony orchestra (2019-22).
- In paradisum (Song for the people of Ukraine) for choir a capella (2022).
- Day and Night for horn and piano (2022).
- Hymnus Aquarius – A hymn to the Baltic Sea for soprano saxophone and large wind band. (2022-23).
