= Marie Samuelsson =

Swedish composer (born 1956)

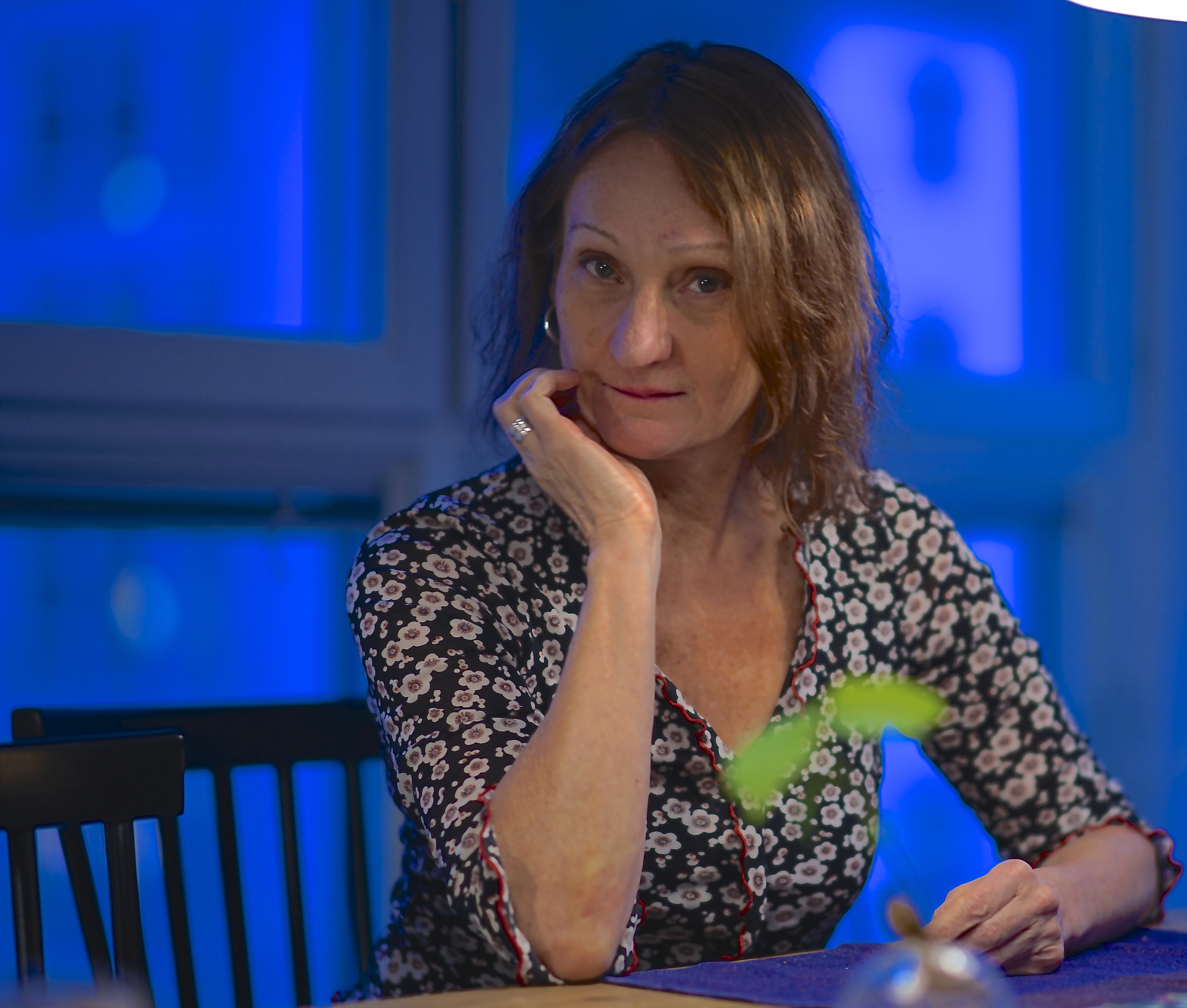
Marie Samuelsson

Marie Samuelsson (born 15 February 1956) is a Swedish composer.

== Biography ==
Marie Samuelsson was born in Stockholm, Sweden. She studied piano and improvisation at Birkagården College from 1979 to 1981, musicology at the Stockholm University from 1982 to 1983 and composition at the Royal College of Music in Stockholm from 1987 to 1995 with Sven-David Sandström, Daniel Börtz and Pär Lindgren.

She later continued her studies with George Benjamin and 2001 she complemented her studies with Stage d’été for professional composers at Ircam in Paris.

Samuelsson is a member of the Royal Swedish Music Academy since 2005. In December 2012, she was elected to vice preses in the presidium of the Royal Swedish Music Academy. Samuelsson was the featured composer of a four-day festival in Stockholm in May 2007 for which her orchestra piece Singla was commissioned and premièred by the Royal Stockholm Philharmonic Orchestra.

== Awards ==
- 2008 Kurt Atterberg Prize
- 2011 Composer Prize in memory of Bo Wallner
- 2016 Ingvar Lidholms Prize
- 2023 Christ Johnson Prize for the double concerto The Crane's Beak for guitar, violin and orchestra
- 2024 Rosenberg Prize

== Works ==
Selected works include:

- Andra platser (Other places), for alto voice, cello, and percussion, 1989
- Katt: Nio liv (Cat: Nine lives), for woodwind quintet, 1989
- Från Indien till Mars (From India to Mars), dance music for string quartet with guitar improvisation, 1990–91
- Den natten (That night), for choir, 1991
- Signal for saxophone quartet, 1991
- Lufttrumma I (Air shaft I), for alto saxophone, piano, and percussion, 1993
- Troll for youth orchestra, 1993
- Krom (Chrome), for brass quintet, 1994
- Lufttrumma II (Air shaft II), for flute, clarinet, percussion, harp, and double bass, 1994
- Magica de Hex (Magica de Spell), for orchestra, 1994
- Pingvinkvartett (Penguin quartet), for flute, violin, cello, and piano, 1996
- Sirén, for saxophone quartet, 1996
- I vargens öga (In the eye of the wolf), for solo saxophone and tape, 1997
- Rotationer (Rotations), for string orchestra, 1997 (revised, 2003)
- Lufttrumma III (Air shaft III), for orchestra, 1999
- Flow for chamber orchestra, 2000
- I Am-Are You?, for French horn and tape, 2001
- Ö (Island), for solo violin, 2002
- Bastet the sun goddess, concerto for violin and orchestra, 2004
- Paths of sorrow, for chamber orchestra, 2005
- Skuggspel (Shadow play), for oboe and percussion, 2005
- Eleven hundred and twelve degrees, for cello and tape, 2006
- Fear and Hope, for orchestra, 2006
- Singla, for orchestra, 2007
- Komposition-Improvisation (Composition-Improvisation), for 2 saxophones, 2007
- Sjörök under Stockholms broar (Sea smoke under Stockholms bridges), for string quartet, 2008
- The Horn in the wind, concerto for horn and orchestra, 2009
- Airborne Lines and Rumbles, for orchestra, 2009
- Fanfar till livet, for brass section, 2010
- Alive, for violin, 2010
- Fantasia i cirkel, quartet 2011
- Somebody is learning how to fly, for clarinet solo, 2011
- Jorun orm i öga, opera libretto: Kerstin Ekman, for The Academy of Vadstena, premiere summer 2013 (work in progress)

Her works have been recorded and issued on CD, including:

- The Love Trilogy (2019) Daphne 1062
- Air Drum (2003) Phono Suecia
- Rydberg, Enström, Samuelsson, Parmerud, Lindwall, and Feiler, (includes Signal) (1997) Caprice
