= Peter van Tour =

Dutch musicologist, music historian and music theorist

Peter van Tour (born 1966) is a Dutch musicologist, music historian and music theorist, specializing in Aural Training, Counterpoint and Historical Improvisation. After moving to Sweden in 1990, he co-founded the Gotland School of Music Composition together with Prof. Sven-David Sandström and Ramon Anthin. At this institution, Peter taught counterpoint, aural skills, music analysis, and history of composition. He is best known as an expert in the field of Partimento and is the author of "Counterpoint and Partimento: Methods of Teaching Composition in Late Eighteenth-Century Naples", his doctoral dissertation. Van Tour is an associate professor of Music Theory and Musical Analysis at Örebro University in Sweden.

== Education ==
Van Tour has Masters Degrees in Music Pedagogy (Brabant Conservatory, 1988), Musicology (Utrecht University, 1990) and Music Theory (Royal College of Music, Stockholm, 2008). In 2015, van Tour received his PhD in Musicology and Music Theory from Uppsala University, with his dissertation "Counterpoint and Partimento: Methods of Teaching Composition in Late Eighteenth-Century Naples" winning the Hilding Rosenberg Award for Musicology. In 2021 he was awarded the annual research grant of Stiftelsen Thuréus Forskarhem och Naturminne.

== Research on Counterpoint and Partimento ==
Van Tour's research has helped identify two different schools of counterpoint instruction among the music conservatories of Naples in the 18th century. These are the school of Leonardo Leo, which emphasized adding counterpoint above or below a cantus firmus and the school of Francesco Durante, which emphasized writing counterpoint above a bass line.

== Awards ==
Peter van Tour and Nicolas Baragwanath (ed.), Special issue: Solfeggio in the Eighteenth Century. International Journal of the Dutch-Flemish Society for Music Theory. Volume 11, #I, May 2024. (Leuven: Leuven University Press, 2024). [pp. 118–45]. Peter van Tour, “Solfeggi as Models for Instruction in Practical Counterpoint and Fugue.” Awarded the 2025 Outstanding Multi-Author Collection Award by the Society for Music Theory. 2025

The 2025 Lorenzo Gori-Mazzoleni price (ca. 3500 €), awarded by the Royal Swedish Academy of Music.

2021 The 2021 prize of Stiftelsen Thuréus forskarhem och naturminne för kultur, natur, litteratur och konst (one-year research grant, ca. 65.000 €)

2016 The 2016 Hilding Rosenberg Scholarship in Musicology (ca. 2000 €), awarded by the Royal Swedish Academy of Music.

2013 Research grant (ca. 6.000 €) from the Birgit and Gad Rausing Foundation for Humanistic Research, Lund, Sweden.

== Books ==
- van Tour, Peter (2017). The 189 Partimenti of Nicola Sala: Complete Edition with Critical Commentary. Acta Universitatis Upsaliensis. ISBN 978-91-554-9778-1.
- van Tour, Peter (2015). Counterpoint and Partimento: Methods of Teaching Composition in Late Eighteenth-Century Naples. Acta Universitatis Upsaliensis. ISBN 978-91-554-9197-0.
