= Gunnar Bucht =

Swedish composer and musicologist

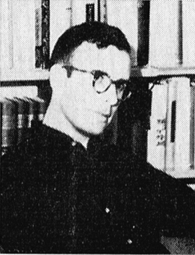
Gunnar Bucht

Gunnar Henrik Bucht (born 5 August 1927) is a Swedish composer and musicologist.

== Life and career ==
Born in Stocksund, Bucht studied composition with Karl-Birger Blomdahl, Carl Orff, and Max Deutsch, among others. He earned a doctorate in musicology from Uppsala University in 1953. His dissertation was on the ritual of the nuns at Vadstena Abbey.

From 1956-1959 he was chairman of Fylkingen, and from 1963 through 1969 he was chairman of the Swedish Society of Composers. He currently served as chairman and secretary of the Swedish division of the International Society for Contemporary Music from 1960-1969, and then as vice president of the entire ICSM from 1969 through 1972.

In 1964 Bucht was made a member of the Royal Swedish Academy of Music. From 1975 through 1985 he was a professor of composition at the Royal College of Music, Stockholm, and then served as that schools director until 1993.

Bucht's compositions include the operas Tronkrävarna and Jerikos murar, choral works, orchestral works, and chamber music. Soprano Alice Esty gave the world premiere of his 1965 composition Sex Årstidssånger in May 1966 at Carnegie Hall. Beginning in the mid 1960s he began experimenting with electronic music.
