= Pär Lindgren =

Swedish composer

Pär Lindgren (born 16 January 1952 in Gothenburg) is a Swedish composer and composition teacher, cited as one of Sweden's leading composers of electroacoustic music, and one of the most important Swedish composers of orchestral music of his generation along with Jan Sandstrom, Anders Hillborg, and Anders Nilsson.

Lindgren studied composition at the Royal College of Music in Stockholm (KMH) in the 1970s. Since 1980, he has taught at KMH and was professor of composition there from 1998 until 2008. Since then, he has returned to being a lecturer. Adrian Knight and Marie Samuelsson were students of Lindgren.

Lindgren won the Christ Johnson Prize in 1987 and 1996.
