= Daniel Börtz =

Swedish composer (born 1943)

Daniel Börtz (born 8 August 1943) is a Swedish composer, born in Hässleholm.

He studied composition under Hilding Rosenberg, Karl-Birger Blomdahl and Ingvar Lidholm. Among his works are the operas Backanterna (1991), Marie Antoinette (1998) and Goya (2009). His Sinfonia 13 was performed by the Royal Stockholm Philharmonic Orchestra in 2019.

== Students ==
- Marie Samuelsson
