= Kroumata =

Kroumata was a Swedish professional percussion ensemble which was active from 1978 until 2015. The name derived from the ancient Greek word for percussion instruments.

The group was founded in Stockholm in 1978 by Ingvar Hallgren, Anders Holdar, Jan Hellgren och Martin Steisner. Its members had worked as percussionists in the military services in Sweden, and their aim was to perform percussion chamber music.

In 1990, Kroumata entered into a contract with the nonprofit foundation Rikskonserter, which was a part of the Swedish Ministry of Culture. From 1990 until 2008, the ensemble was employed by Rikskonserter.

Kroumata toured extensively in Sweden and internationally, and performed with orchestras including the Los Angeles Philharmonic Orchestra and Berliner Symphoniker, as well as separately as a solo ensemble. More than 240 works were written for the group, by composers including Sofia Gubaidulina, Sven-Erik Bäck, Sven-David Sandström, and Georg Katzer.

In 2015, the ensemble was dissolved, as it was becoming increasingly difficult for the members to live on the income generated by their performances and recordings. Many of the percussion instruments used by Kroumata were owned by Rikskonserter and subsequently by the Swedish Performing Arts Agency. In 2015, the Stockholm University College of Music Education took over the administration of this collection of instruments, and in 2019 it was made available to musicians through the Kroumata Percussion Center.

== Members ==
The founding members of Kroumata were Ingvar Hallgren, Jan Hellgren, Anders Holdar, and Martin Steisner. Anders Loguin was not one of the initial members, but was hired after the ensemble's inception. When Kroumata was dissolved, the members were Roger Bergström, Pontus Langendorf, Ulrik Nilsson, and Johan Silvmark.

- Roger Bergström, 1991-2015
- Pontus Langendorf, 2010-2015
- Ulrik Nilsson, 2008-2015
- Johan Silvmark, 1983-2015
- Anders Holdar, 1978-2009
- John Eriksson, 1999-2008
- Leif Karlsson, 1984-2008
- Anders Loguin,1981-2008
- Ingvar Hallgren, 1978-1999
- Jan Hellgren, 1978-1990
- Martin Steisner, 1978-1984
