= Norrbotten NEO =

- Members: Mårten Landström (piano), Sara Hammarström (flute), Robert Ek (clarinet), Nikolay Shugaev (cello), Daniel Saur (percussion)
- Past members: Petter Sundkvist, Brusk Zanganeh, Kim Hellgren, Robert Ek, Elemer Lavotha, Cristian Svarfar, Thomas Sundkvist

Norrbotten NEO is a Swedish foremost chamber ensemble dedicated to contemporary classical music. Nordic Council Music Prize nominee.

The ensemble was formed 2007 and is based in the concert hall Studio Acusticum in Piteå, Sweden. NEO regularly collaborates with contemporary composers and commission new works on a yearly basis. The repertoire includes music by composers like Henrik Strindberg, Per Mårtensson, Karin Renqvist, Klas Torstensson, Johan Ullen and many others. The ensemble receives financial support from "The Swedish Arts Council", "Norrbotten county council" as well as "Luleå- and Piteå municipality". The ensemble have toured both in Sweden and abroad.

== Legacy ==
Norrbotten NEO celebrated its 15th anniversary at the forefront of contemporary chamber music in 2022. Today the ensemble is charged with promoting contemporary art music nationally. Norrbotten NEO continuously commissions new works and collaborates with both younger and more established composers, nationally and internationally, and has premiered over 400 works.

== Sources ==
- Info from Made festival
- (Info in swedish)
