= Swedish Society of Composers =

Organization

The Swedish Society of Composers ('Föreningen Svenska Tonsättare', 'FST') is a professional organization based in Stockholm, Sweden, representing Swedish composers of contemporary classical music. It was founded in 1918, and today has 370 members, of which 347 are composers. The president is Martin Q Larsson, since 2010.

The FST is represented in national boards and institutions within the Swedish art music field. It was in 1923 that the FST founded STIM in order to collect license fees when musical works are performed in public, broadcast, or transmitted, and to pay out performing royalties.

The Nordic cooperation within the 'Nordic Composers Council' is very active. The Swedish Society of Composers is also internationally represented by ECSA, the European Composer and Songwriter Alliance.
