= Anders Nilsson (composer) =

Swedish composer (born 1954)

Anders Nilsson (born July 6, 1954 in Stockholm, Sweden) is a Swedish composer. He made his début as composer with the first part of the trilogy Trois Pièces pour grand orchestre in Copenhagen (1981). He has composed orchestral music, including three symphonies, several concertos, and chamber music as well as three operas: the first opera Klassresan to his own libretto received its première in 2003 and the second, Zarah (about Zarah Leander's time in Nazi Germany, with a libretto by Claes Fellbom), was premièred in 2007 at the Folkoperan in Stockholm. Zarah was performed 52 times and was seen by more than 25,000 people (82% sold tickets in average). The third opera, ¨Kira - i huset där jag bor¨ (Kira - in the house where I live) was created in collaboration with Charlotte Engelkes and Sophie Holgersson, premiered on 2013, is an opera about the common phenomena of changing rights of tenancy to rights of tenant ownership, and what happens to former tenants and their way of regarding those fellow tenants who has not money enough to buy their flats.
