= Henrik Strindberg =

Swedish composer of contemporary music (born 1954)

Henrik Strindberg (born 28 March 1954) is a Swedish composer of contemporary music. He studied composition at the Royal College of Music in Stockholm from 1980 to 1987 where he studied for Gunnar Bucht and Sven-David Sandström amongst others. In 1985 he also participated in a summer course with Iannis Xenakis in Delphi. Apart from composing, he has been a member of the progressive rock band Ragnarök since the 1970s. His music has been performed by acclaimed ensembles such as Swedish Radio Symphony Orchestra, Kroumata, Sonanza and The Gothenburg Combo.

== Partial list of works ==
- Bambu (1984)
- Modell (1984)
- Hjärtats slag (Heart Beats) (1985)
- Inse (1985)
- Unngg (1985)
- Tredje andningen (Third Wind) (1985–1986)
- I träd (Within Trees) (1986–1988)
- Det första kvädet om Gudrun (1987)
- Cassant (1989)
- Fyra stycken (Four Pieces) (1990)
- Etymology (1990–1992)
- Katsu (1991)
- 2 Pianos (1992)
- Cheap Thrills (1993)
- Nattlig madonna (Nocturnal Madonna) (1993)
- Ursprung/gläntor (Origins/Glades) (1993)
- Näcken epilog (1994–2002)
- Förstorade fragment av en melodi (Magnified Fragments of a Melody) (1995–1996)
- Vandringsflöjten (The Wandering Flute) (1996)
- Hopp (Hope) (1997)
- Minne (Memorial) (1997)
- Utvald (Chosen) (1998)
- Lika (Equal) (1998–1999)
- En mans väg hos en ung kvinna (2000)
- Trådar (Threads) (2001)
- ...knäpper och drar (2002)
- Lågmälda göranden (Understated Activities) (2003)
- This road to Baghdad (2003)
- I thought someone came (2003–2004)
- Puff (2004)
- Bryta snitt. Tiden fryser (2005)
- Zum-zum-zum (2006)
- Neptuni åkrar (2006)
