= List of Swedish composers =

The following is a list of Swedish composers:

== Born before 1800 ==
- Gustaf Düben (the Elder) (1624–1690)
- Johan Helmich Roman (1694–1758)
- Johan Agrell (1701–1765)
- Carl Michael Bellman (1740–1795)
- Johann Gottlieb Naumann (1741–1801)
- Johan Wikmanson (1753–1800)
- Joseph Martin Kraus (1756–1792)
- Johann Christian Friedrich Hæffner (1759–1833)
- Fredrik Lithander (1777–1823)
- Joachim Nicolas Eggert (1779–1813)
- Johan Fredrik Berwald (1787–1861)
- Hedda Wrangel (1792–1833)
- Caroline Ridderstolpe (1793–1878)
- Franz Berwald (1796–1868)

== Born 1800s ==
- Adolf Fredrik Lindblad (1801–1878)
- Jacob Niclas Ahlström (1805–1857)
- Otto Lindblad (1809–1864)
- Gunnar Wennerberg (1817–1901)
- Emilie Hammarskjöld (1821–1854)
- Betty Boije (1822–1854) Wife of Johan Isidor Dannström
- Fritz Arlberg (1830–1896)
- Ludvig Norman (1831–1885)
- August Söderman (1832–1876)
- Oscar de Wahl (1832–1873)
- Gustav Stolpe (1833–1901)
- Bertha Tammelin (1836–1915)
- Lotten Edholm (1839–1930)
- Elfrida Andrée (1841–1929)
- Andreas Hallén (1846–1925)
- Jacob Adolf Hägg (1850–1928)
- Helena Munktell (1852–1919)
- Amanda Maier (1853–1894)
- Emil Sjögren (1853–1918)
- Wilhelm Harteveld (1859–1927)
- Valborg Aulin (1860–1928)
- Tor Aulin (1866–1914)
- Wilhelm Peterson-Berger (1867–1942)
- Henning Mankell (1868–1930)
- Ruth Almén, (1870–1945)
- Wilhelm Stenhammar (1871–1927)
- Ruben Liljefors (1871–1936)
- Hugo Alfvén (1872–1960)
- Sara Wennerberg-Reuter (1875–1959)
- Adolf Wiklund (1879–1950)
- Otto Olsson (1879–1964)
- Natanael Berg (1879–1957)
- Viktor Widqvist (1881–1952)
- Edvin Kallstenius (1881–1967)
- Ture Rangström (1884–1947)
- Sam Rydberg (1885–1956)
- Kurt Atterberg (1887–1974)
- Oskar Lindberg (1887–1955)
- Gösta Nystroem (1890–1966)
- Evert Taube (1890–1976)
- Hilding Rosenberg (1892–1985)
- John Fernström (1897–1961)
- Yngve Sköld (1899–1992)

== Born 1900s ==
- Dag Wirén (1905–1986)
- Lars-Erik Larsson (1908–1986)
- Gunnar de Frumerie (1908–1987)
- Erland von Koch (1910–2009)
- Allan Pettersson (1911–1980)
- Ebbe Grims-land (1915–2015)
- Karl-Birger Blomdahl (1916–1968)
- Sven-Erik Bäck (1919–1994)
- Ingvar Lidholm (1921–2017)
- Lars Edlund (1922–2013)
- Hans Eklund (1927–1999)
- Bengt Hambraeus (1928–2000)
- Bo Linde (1933–1970)
- Ulf Björlin (1933–1993)
- Lars Gunnar Bodin (born 1935)
- Ralph Lundsten (born 1936)
- Bo Nilsson (1937-2018)
- Sven-David Sandström (1942–2019)
- Daniel Börtz (born 1943)
- Benny Andersson (born 1946)
- Anders Eliasson (1947-2013)
- Nils-Göran Areskoug (born 1951)
- Hans Gefors (born 1952)
- Anders Hillborg (born 1954)
- Anders Nilsson (born 1954)
- Jan Sandström (born 1954)
- Rolf Martinsson (born 1956)
- Michael Saxell (born 1956)
- Sten Melin (born 1957)
- Karin Rehnqvist (born 1957)
- Fredrik Sixten (born 1962)
- Robert Wells (born 1962)
- Roland Pöntinen (born 1963)
- Yngwie Malmsteen (born 1963)
- Fredrik Högberg (born 1971)
- Jesper Nordin (born 1971)
- Malin Bång (born 1974)
- Jonathan Östlund (born 1975)
- Britta Byström (born 1977)
- Benjamin Staern (born 1978)
- Andrea Tarrodi (born 1981)
- Ludwig Göransson (born 1984)
- Lisa Streich (born 1985)
- Jonatan Sersam (born 1986)
- Jacob Mühlrad (born 1991)
