= Järnåker Foundation =

Erik Järnåkers fond i Kungl. Musikaliska Akademien, abbreviated to Järnåkerfonden or the Järnåker Foundation, is a fund which arises from donations by Erik Järnåker. The fund is managed by the Royal Swedish Academy of Music.

== The fund ==
The foundation consists of two parts.

=== String Instrument Fund ===
The first part, the String Instrument Fund, was set up following a donation in 1979. This fund has a large number of high-quality string instruments, which are placed at the disposal of prominent Swedish musicians.

=== Saltö Foundation ===
The second part, the Saltö Foundation, originally owned a farm with five log houses on Saltö in Bohuslän, a facility intended for the recreation and artistic activities of composers, musicians and music educators. In accordance with the founder's instructions, the farm was sold when it became financially impossible for the foundation to continue running it, and the proceeds were used for a scholarship fund. From this, disbursements have been made annually since 2008, in accordance with Järnåker's wishes, for scholarships, partly to students at Swedish music academies, and partly to chamber music composers.

== Saltö Foundation Award winners ==
=== Composer Fellows ===
- 2008 - Mikael Edlund, for his work Solo, for violin from 1999.
- 2009 - Jan W. Morthenson for the work String Quartet No. 3 Epilogos.
- 2010 - Klas Torstensson for the work In grosser Sehnsucht (for soprano and piano trio to texts by Camille Claudel, Frida Kahlo, Queen Christina, Rosa Luxemburg and Louise Michel).
- 2011 - Madeleine Isaksson for the work Les Sept Vallées (for recorder and inspired by the Persian poem The Conference of the Birds by Farid ud-Din Attar).
- 2012 - Leilei Tian for the work In our image, in our likeness (for violin and recorder).
- 2013 - Joakim Sandgren for the work endroits susceptibles (for six musicians and computer).
- 2014 - Jesper Nordin for the work Pendants.
- 2015 - Staffan Storm for the work ...et lux in tenebris lucet.
- 2016 - Kent Olofsson for the work Champs d'etoiles.
- 2017 - Ylva Lund Bergner for the work Achenar.
- 2018 - Jenny Hettne for the work A swarm came in from the dark.
- 2019 - Karin Rehnqvist for the work Blodhov.
- 2020 - Djuro Zivkovic for the work Citadel of Love
- 2021 - Anders Hillborg for the work Duo for Cello and Piano
- 2022 - Henrik Denerin for the work Collide
- 2023 - Jonatan Sersam for the work Presencia de Sombra
- 2024 - Britta Byström for the work Alphabet

=== String Scholars ===
- 2008 - Violinist Anne-Sofie Andersen and cellist Hanna Dahlkvist.
- 2009 - Violinist Daniel Migdal and cellist Amelia Jakobsson-Boyarsky.
- 2010 - Violinist Dora Asterstad and cellist Torun Stavseng Sæter.
- 2011 - Viola player Ellen Nisbeth and cellist Tomas Lundström.
- 2012 - Violinist Isabelle Bania and cellist Karolina Öhman.
- 2013 - Violinist Henrik Naimark Meyers and cellist Frida FW Wærvågen.
- 2014 - Violinist Ylva Larsdotter, cellist Erik Uusijärvi and double bassist Per Björkling.
- 2015 - Violinist Elna Carr and cellist Daniel Tengberg.
- 2016 - Violinist Agata Kawa Cajler and cellist Antonio Hallongren.
- 2017 - Violinist Yongmin Lee and cellist Amalie Stalheim.
- 2018 - Violinist Johannes Marmén and cellist Fred Lindberg.
- 2019 - Violinist Philip Zuckerman and cellist Filip Lundberg.
- 2020 - Violinist Johannes Schantz and cellist Kristina Winiarski.
- 2021 - Violinist Alva Holm and cellist Daniel Thorell.
- 2022 - Violinist Albin Uusijärvi and cellist Lydia Hillerudh.
- 2023 - Violinist Marcus Bäckerud and cellist Astrid Hillerud.
- 2024 - Violinist Jonna Simonsson and cellists Gabriel Punsvik Gluch and Annika Valkeajoki.
