= Susanne Rosenberg =

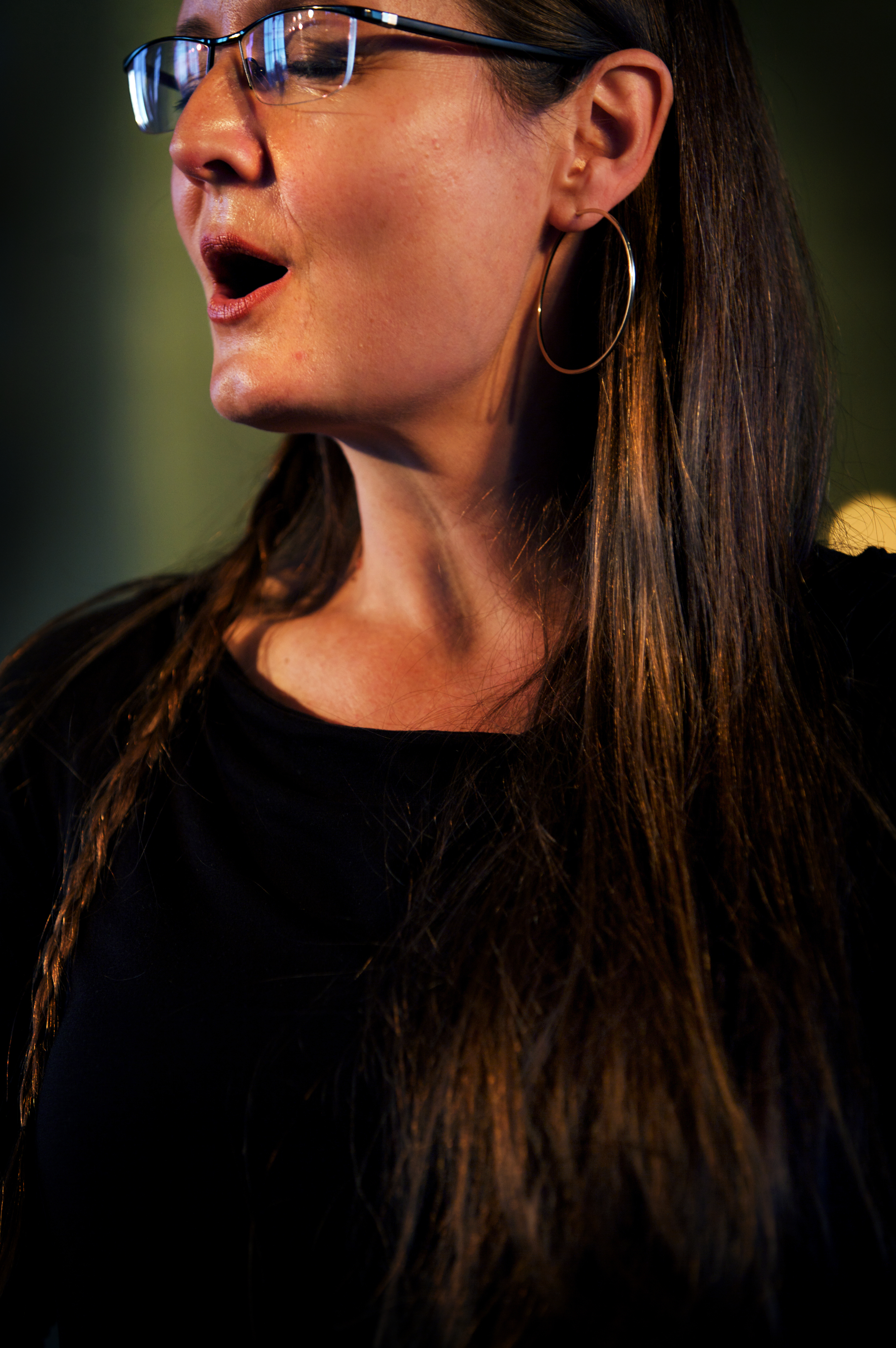
- Born: 29 August 1957 (age 67)
- Education: Stockholm University; Royal College of Music, Stockholm
- Occupations: Folk singer; academic teacher
- Years active: 1987–present
- Organizations: Royal College of Music; Sibelius Academy
- Musical career
- Member of: Rosenbergs Sjua, Rotvälta

Susanne Rosenberg (born 29 August 1957) ) is a Swedish folk singer, professor, and researcher.

Susanne Rosenberg grew up outside Stockholm and has been a freelance singer since the early 1980s. She studied at the Royal College of Music, Stockholm on an individual performance programme from 1984 to 1988. Rosenberg has been a teacher there since 1992 and professor (2016) of folk singing. Between 2004 and 2020 she was head of the Department of Folk Music.

== Academic career ==
She studied musicology at Stockholm University from 1982 to 1984, which resulted in the thesis centered around a traditional singer singing style. 1987 and 1991, she worked as a teacher at the Sibelius Academy in Helsinki. In 2013, Rosenberg defended her doctoral studies in collaboration with the Royal College of Music in Stockholm and the Sibelius Academy with the artistic dissertation "Kurbits-ReBoot – Swedish Folk singing in a new artistic context."

== Music career ==
Rosenberg is one of Sweden's most established folk singers today. Her vocal expression has excellent breadth, from older folk song techniques such as kulning to baroque, jazz, and modern art music. She is also active as a researcher, pedagogue, composer, arranger, and writer.

Susanne Rosenberg has been a pioneer in rediscovering older folk singing style and using it in new artistic contexts both in terms of her artistic expression and educator and for polyphonic singing and choir. During the 1990s, she developed polyphonic folk singing in her "Folk Women's Choir" (1993-1996), and she has also written works for choirs such as "Pust" (2000), "Stjärnan" (2013), "Missa Vox Mundi" (2021). In Sweden, she has collaborated with the composer Karin Rehnqvist and premiered several works written directly for Rosenberg such as "Puksånger - Lockrop" (1989), "Hetluft" (1993) "Rädda mig ur dyn" (1997), "Så går en dag" (2000), and with directors such as Peter Oskarsson (Den Stora Vreden, 1988–1990) and Leif Stinnerbom ("Ljuset" 1996). Outside Sweden, she collaborated with Quincy Jones and Clark Terry (Sonic Convergence 2001) and in Japan with Ryuichi Sakamoto (L I F E 2000).

Among her artistic projects are "Syn för sägen" (1995) "ReBoot-OmStart" (2010), "Kurbits-Koral - The Spirit of the moment" (2010), "Getens horn" (2011), "Voice Space" (2013) "Folk Vocal" (2014) and others. Since 2014, she has been conducting the artistic research project ”Folk Song Lab", with the support of the Swedish Research Council (2019-2021). Rosenberg is active in several research fields and has published articles in Kulning, folk song style, Improvisation, and artistic research.

She has also developed and published several educational methods and materials in folk singing, folk singing style and kulning. As head of the Department of Folk Music at KMH, Rosenberg developed many pedagogical concepts, courses, and programs. She has been influential in developing folk music education in Higher Music Education, not only in Sweden. As a teacher, she has taught most of today's young folk singers who have studied at KMH and have developed topics such as folk song methodology and kulning and folk song singing courses.

She started the folk music groups Rosenbergs Sjua, Krus och Rotvälta and has toured Europe, the US, and Asia. Other groups she has participated in is Kvickrot, Höök, Out of Time and Country, Luftstråk, and she has been published on phonograms since the 1980s both with groups and as soloists. Rosenberg has on several occasions received artist's scholarship and research funding.

Rosenberg was appointed member of the Royal Swedish Academy of Music in 2015.

Since 1988 she has been married to fiddler and researcher Sven Ahlbäck.
