= Westberg =

Westberg is a Swedish topographic surname, which means "west mountain" or "west hill", from the Swedish terms väst ("west") and berg ("mountain" or "hill"). Alternative spellings include Wästberg, Västberg and Vestberg. The surname may refer to:

- Anna Westberg (1946–2005), a Swedish novelist and non-fiction writer
- Chad Westberg, an American politician
- Curt Westberg (born 1943), a Swedish Air Force major general
- Emelie Westberg (born 1990), a Swedish handball player
- Erik Westberg (born 1956), a Swedish conductor and professor in music performance
- Granger E. Westberg (1913–1999), an American Lutheran clergyman and professor
- Hans Vestberg (born 1965), a Swedish businessman
- Jacob Westberg (1885–1933), a Swedish long-distance runner
- Johanna Westberg (born 1990), a Swedish handball player
- Karolina Westberg (born 1978), a Swedish footballer
- Leslie J. Westberg (1920–1997), an American brigadier
- Niklas Westberg (born 1979), a Swedish footballer
- Norman Westberg (born 1958), an American guitarist
- Maria Westberg (1853–1893), a Swedish ballerina
- Peter Westberg (born 1995), a Swedish footballer
- Rune Westberg (born 1974), a Danish songwriter, record producer, and mixer
- Quentin Westberg (born 1986), a French-American soccer player

== See also ==
- Wästberg
