= B. Tommy Andersson =

Swedish conductor and composer

Bengt Tommy Andersson (born 26 July 1964 in Borås, Sweden) is a Swedish conductor and composer.

Andersson received his training as a conductor at the Royal College of Music, Stockholm, where he worked with Eric Ericson, Péter Eötvös, Brian Priestman, Sergiu Comissiona and Gennady Rozhdestvensky. Andersson has conducted all of the major orchestras and at most opera houses in Sweden – and many elsewhere. From 2003 to 2009 he was Professor of Orchestral Playing at University of Gothenburg, and since 2012 he is Professor of Orchestral Conducting at Royal College of Music, Stockholm, Sweden.

He has also composed music since he was 11 years old. He studied composition with Sven-Eric Johanson, Hans Eklund (composer), and Sven-David Sandström in the 1980s. Since 1995 his music has become more and more in demand and he is continuously composing music. There are more than 100 compositions by B. Tommy Andersson.

2006 saw the première of Andersson's opera William, a fantasy on William Shakespeare and Christopher Marlowe commissioned by the Vadstena Academy; the libretto was written by Håkan Lindquist. Andersson was the BBC National Orchestra of Wales's Composer-in-Association for 2014-15. A new work for organ and orchestra, Pan, premièred at the 2015 BBC Proms.

== Awards and honours ==
- 1996 - elected as a member of the Swedish Society of Composers (Föreningen svenska tonsättare)
- 2002 - Made Member No. 944 of the Royal Swedish Academy of Music
