= Yngve Sköld =

Swedish composer, pianist and organist (1899–1992)

Karl Yngve Sköld (Swedish pronunciation: [ˈʏ̂ŋːvɛ ˈɧœlːd]; 29 April 1899 – 6 December 1992) was a Swedish composer, pianist and organist. As well as writing orchestral, solo and chamber music and giving public concerts, he also worked for the Swedish Film industry. His music is described as late Romantic, imaginative and technically impressive, with some national influences.

== Life ==
He was born in Vallby, Södermanland County, Sweden. His father, a cantor and college teacher, died when Yngve was ten years old.

He studied piano with Richard Andersson and attended the Royal College of Music, Stockholm from 1915 to 1918 where he learnt composition and counterpoint with Harald Fryklöf. During his teens, his musical talent both as composer and pianist became apparent; his 1916 piano trio, first symphony (opus 3, 1915) and first piano concerto (opus 7, 1917) were among a number of works composed in this period. He passed the organists' examination in 1919.

He then studied abroad from 1920 to 1922, first at the Brno Conservatory, where he won first prize in a piano competition for his performance of Beethoven's fifth piano concerto, and then at the Prague Conservatory's Meisterschule, where he performed his Concert Fantasy for piano and orchestra (opus 21, composed in 1921). In 1933, after returning to Stockholm, he passed the advanced examination in choir direction and music teaching.

During his career he went on to compose many orchestral works, including three more symphonies and ten concerti. He wrote piano and organ pieces, chamber music, vocal and choral music, and music for several films. His music is late Romantic, imaginative and technically impressive, with some national influences. The second symphony is especially worthy of note. The unusual number of his compositions featuring the viola may be related to the fact that his brother, an engineer, was a lifelong enthusiastic player of the instrument.

Sköld continued to perform, including employment as pianist, organist and composer by the Swedish Film Industry from 1923, even appearing in two films: Bara en trumpetare (Just a Trumpeter) in 1938, and then as a theatre piano player in the 1940 film Kyss henne! (Kiss Her!). He also gave annual new year organ concerts in Stockholm City Hall during the thirties.

He was music librarian to the Society of Swedish Composers from 1938 to 1964 and was secretary and treasurer of the Swedish Occidental Association from 1936 to 1964. He retired in 1964.

Sköld was the author of the first original music composed in the auxiliary language Occidental; in 1934 he wrote two pieces, Du canzones, for three-part female choir and piano to words by Czech poet Jaroslav Podobsky. The two songs were entitled Alaude, canta! (Sing, lark) and Ne abandona me (Don't leave me).

Sköld died in 1992 in Ingarö, Värmdö municipality, Sweden, leaving his widow Olga, his son Gunnar and daughter-in-law Solveig, and his grandson.

== Works ==
Sköld's works include:

| Year | Work | Opus | Duration (mins) |
|---|---|---|---|
| 1914 | Sonata for piano No. 1 | 1 | |
| 1915 | Symphony No.1 | 3 | |
| 1916 | Romance for viola and piano | | |
| | Theme and variations for piano | 6 | |
| 1917 | Piano Concerto No.1 | 7 | |
| 1917 | Three ballads for piano | 8 | |
| | Legend for viola and orchestra | 9 | |
| 1919 | Fantasy for viola and organ | 12 | 12 |
| 1922 | Suite for organ | 13 | 12 |
| 1920 | Poem for violin and piano | 16 | 2.5 |
| 1921 | Pezzo drammatico for violin and piano | 19 | 8 |
| | Prelude and fugue for piano | 20 | 16 |
| 1921 | Concert Fantasy No.2 for Piano and Orchestra | 21 | 20 |
| 1927 | Sonatin for violin and piano | 23 | 20 |
| 1926 | Poeme elegique for orchestra | 25 | |
| 1926 | Elegy for saloon orchestra | | 8 |
| 1927 | Sonata for cello and piano | 26 | 27.5 |
| 1927 | Serenade for flute, violin and viola | 27 | 15 |
| 1928 | Festival polonaise for orchestra | | |
| 1928 | Fantasy variations for piano | 28 | |
| 1929 | Music for the film Rågens rike | | |
| 1930 | String quartet no. 1 | 29 | 22.5 |
| 1930 | Suite No.1 for orchestra | 30 | 16 |
| 1930 | Berceuse for piano (for the birth of his son Gunnar) | | |
| 1931 | October evening for voices and piano | | |
| 1931 | Alla leggenda for viola, orchestra and organ | 31 | 12 |
| 1934 | Sag varifran kom du for voice and string orchestra | | |
| 1934 | Du canzones (Alaude, canta! & Ne abandona me) for SSA and piano | | 2.5 |
| 1935 | Music for the film Bränningar | | |
| 1935 | Cantata Gustaf Adolf for soprano, baritone, chorus and string orchestra | 32 | 25 |
| 1936 | Valse chromatique for orchestra | 33 | 6 |
| 1936 | Lyric Poem for Violin and Orchestra | 34 | 7 |
| 1936 | Suite Concertante for Viola and Orchestra | 35 | 30 |
| 1936 | Poem for Violin and Orchestra | | 5 |
| 1937 | Symphony No.2 | 36 | 43 |
| 1938 | Festival polonaise for concert band | | |
| 1939 | Trumpet Concerto | 37 | 8 |
| 1939 | Sinfonia da chiesa for organ and orchestra | 38 | 24 |
| 1939 | Det harda villkoret for mezzo-soprano and string orchestra | | 3 |
| | Suite No.1 for string orchestra | 39 | |
| 1939 | Meditation for string quartet | 39a | |
| 1941 | Violin Concerto | 40 | 28 |
| | Five pieces for cello and piano | 41 | 30 |
| | Two pieces for orchestra | 42 | |
| 1944 | Music for the film Gryning | | |
| 1944 | Svit i gammal stil for violin and piano | 42 | 30 |
| 1944 | Sång till människan for tenor, men's choir and orchestra | 43 | 10 |
| 1945 | Consolation for Viola and Small Orchestra | | 4 |
| 1945 | Suite No.2 for orchestra | 44 | 26 |
| 1945 | Twelve Songs for voice and orchestra | 45 | 20 |
| 1946 | Concert Overture | 47 | 8 |
| 1947 | Piano Concerto No.2 | 46 | 30 |
| 1947 | Suite No.2 for string orchestra | 48 | 24 |
| 1947 | Cello Concerto | 49 | 23 |
| 1948 | Symphony No.3 | 50 | 31 |
| 1950 | Music for the film Kvartetten som sprängdes | | |
| 1950 | Variationer över...Moder Jords vaggvisa for piano | 51 | 11 |
| 1950 | Double Concerto for Violin, Cello and Orchestra | 52 | 28 |
| 1952 | Music for the film Under svällande segel | | |
| 1952 | Divertimento for orchestra | 53 | 22 |
| 1953 | Two dance pieces for orchestra | 54 | 17 |
| 1953 | Poem Tankar I skymningen for chamber orchestra | | 3 |
| 1955 | String quartet no. 2 | 55 | 25.5 |
| 1955 | Fantasy Overture | 56 | 13 |
| 1957 | Sonatina for flute and piano | 57 | 22 |
| 1958 | Quartet for two flutes, cello and piano | 58 | 23 |
| 1958 | Sonata for solo violin | 59 | 19 |
| 1959 | Suite for violin and piano | 60 | 15 |
| 1961 | Betraktelser = Meditazioni : 7 pieces for organ | 61 | 26 |
| 1962 | Sonata for viola and organ | 62 | 15 |
| 1963 | Concertino for Five Wind Instruments, Strings and Timpani | 63 | 20 |
| 1963 | Sonata for piano No. 2 | 64 | 16 |
| 1965 | String quartet no. 3 | 65 | 27 |
| 1966 | Symphony No.4 | 66 | 40 |
| 1969 | Piano Concerto No.3 | 67 | 30 |
| 1970 | Sonatina for piano | 68 | 17 |
| 1970 | Divertimento for violin, viola and cello | 70 | 22 |
| 1974 | Suite for French horn/cello and piano | 71 | 17 |
| 1974 | String quartet no. 4 | 72 | 24 |
| 1975 | Trio domestico for violin, cello and piano | 73 | 25 |
| 1977 | Horn Concerto | 74 | 22 |
| 1978 | Variationsfantasi for piano | 75 | 15 |
| 1979 | Impromptu for horn, viola, cello and piano | 76 | 6 |
| 1980 | Elegie for string quartet | 77 | 7 |

His music was also used in the 2000 film Skönheten skall rädda världen.

== Discography ==
Several commercial recordings have featured or included Sköld's works:

- 1999 – Marteau: His Swedish Colleagues | includes Sköld's Melody for Violin and Piano (Caprice CAP21620)
- 2001 – Svensk Pianomusik, Vol. 1: Skärgårdsskisser | includes Sköld's Preludio e Fuga quasi una fantasia op. 20 (Phono Suecia PSCD715)
- 2002 – Symfoni Nr 2 Op 36 / Violinkonsert Op 40 | Sköld (Phono Suecia PSCD719)
- 2006 – Swedish Romance for Meditation | includes Sköld's Berceuse (Naxos Catalogue No: 8.570303)
- 2008 – Poem for Cello & Piano, Cello Sonata, Suite for Horn & Piano | Sköld (Sterling CDA1665)
- 2009 – The Symphonic Swedish Organ | includes Sköld's Adagio (Proprius PRCD2052)
- 2010 – Svenska tangenter Svenska pianister före 1950 | includes the second movement of Sköld's second piano sonata, played by the composer (Caprice CAP21681)
- 2011 – Den Bästa Stunden | includes Sköld's Berceuse (Carpe Diem CDCD002)
