= Bror Beckman =

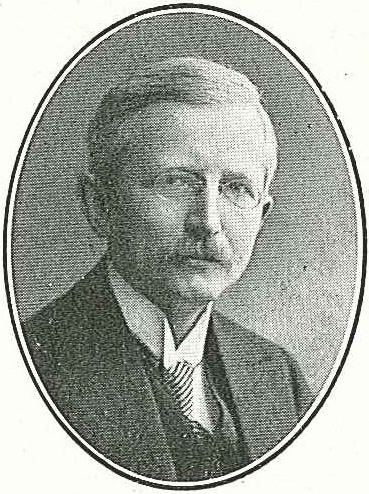
Bror Beckman

Bror Beckman (2 February 1866 – 22 July 1929) was a Swedish composer, treasurer to the Royal Swedish Academy of Music and principal of the Royal College of Music. Stylistically he was strongly influenced by Carl Nielsen and other contemporary Nordic composers. Among his compositions, his symphony in F major has been singled out, together with several pieces for piano, as particularly lasting.

== Biography ==
Bror Beckman was born in Kristinehamn. His grandfather was the pastor and hymn writer Johan Vilhelm Beckman. After finishing upper secondary school, his first job was in a music shop in Kristiania (present-day Oslo) in 1884. Later the same year he moved to Stockholm, to work in a music shop there. In 1888 he started working as a clerk in an insurance company, a job he would keep until 1909.

In parallel he pursued studies in musical composition for Johan Lindegren 1885–1890. During this time, he made lifelong friends with several other young Swedish composers: Harald Fryklöf, Knut Håkanson and Sigurd von Koch. After finishing his studies he immediately took up teaching counterpoint at a musical institute in Stockholm run by Sigrid Carlheim-Gyllensköld. In 1893 the first musical composition by Beckman was printed. He received a state-sponsored scholarship in 1894 and made a study trip to Berlin the same year, where he studied orchestration under Franz Mannstädt. He went on further trips abroad to study music in Germany and Austria in 1912 and 1913.

In 1904, he was elected a member of the Royal Swedish Academy of Music. He soon became deeply engaged in the work of the academy, and in 1909 he resigned from his job at the insurance company to take up the position of treasurer at the academy. In 1911 he was appointed principal of the Royal College of Music.

Bror Beckman was homosexual, and lived with his mother most of his life. He died in Ljungskile.

== Compositions ==
Beckman all but ceased composing after his appointment as principal of the Royal College of Music. Many of his compositions were furthermore never published; he had a timid demeanour and was reluctant to act in ways which could be perceived as self-promoting. The work he did publish has been described as testifying "to deft craftsmanship, an unswerving sense of form and a superb command of contrapuntal writing". Stylistically, his compositions show inspiration from August Söderman, Edvard Grieg, Johan Svendsen, Franz Berwald and not least Carl Nielsen, with whom he corresponded regularly. Beckman's work ranges from compositions for the pump organ, of which he was an enthusiastic proponent, to piano pieces, which are among his most played pieces. A symphony in F major has been called Beckman's tour de force.

== Sources cited ==
- Dahl, Torsten, ed. (1948). Svenska män och kvinnor. Biografisk uppslagsbok [Swedish men and women. Biographical dictionary] (in Swedish). Vol. 1. Stockholm: Albert Bonnier. OCLC 4629338.
