= Hymnus amoris =

Choral composition by Carl Nielsen

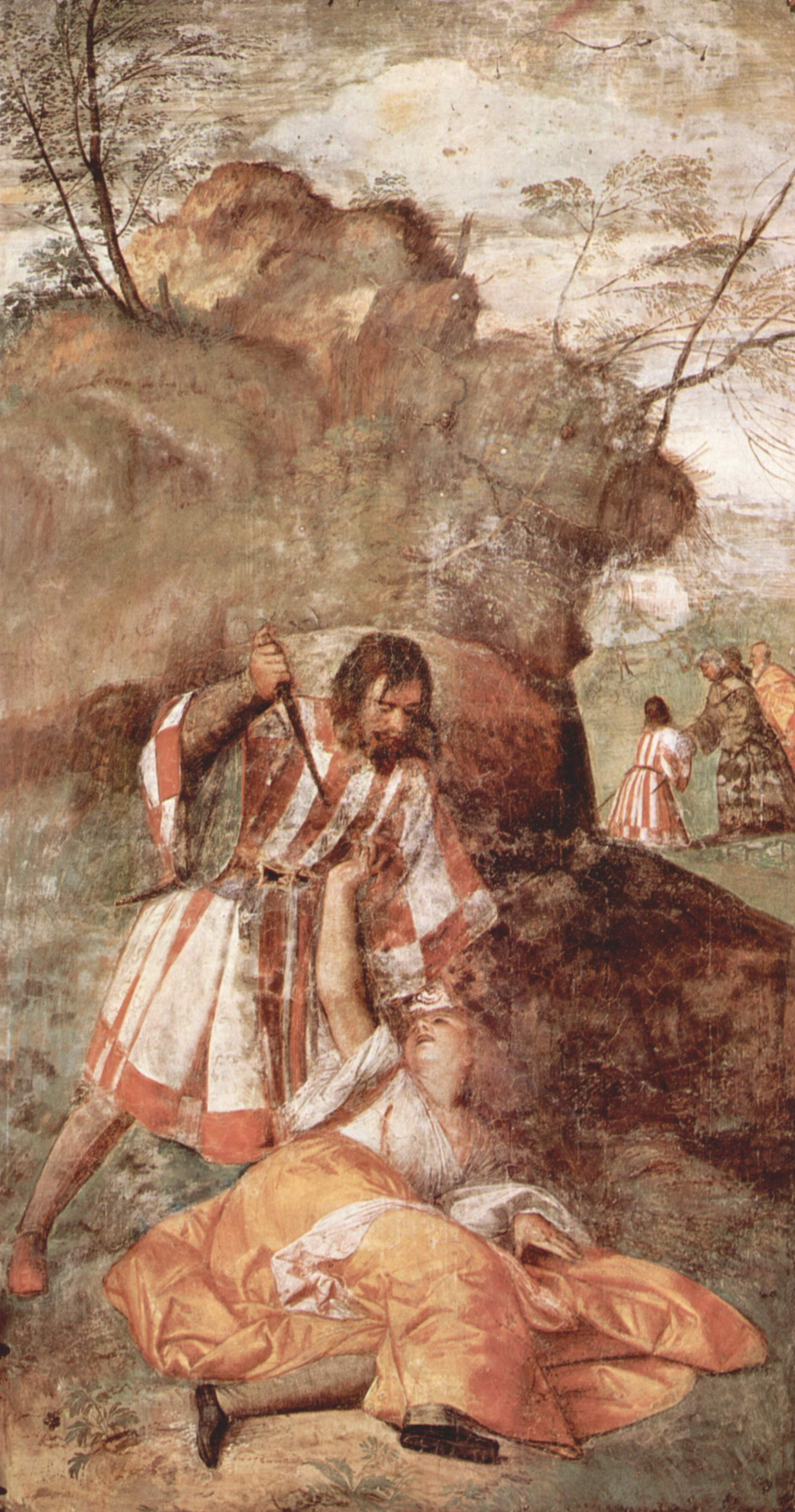
Titian's "Miracle of a Jealous Husband" which inspired the work

Hymnus amoris (Danish: Hymne til Kjærligheden; English: Hymn of Love), for soloists, choir and orchestra, Opus 12, is Carl Nielsen's earliest choral work. It was first performed at the Music Society (Musikforeningen) in Copenhagen on 27 April 1897 under the baton of the composer.

== Background ==
Carl Nielsen was inspired to write Hymnus amoris in 1891 while on his honeymoon in Italy. He and his wife Anne Marie were both impressed by Titian's painting The Miracle of a Jealous Husband in Padua. After he had completed the score, his wife provided a drawing for the title page. On one of the copies, Nielsen wrote: "To my own Marie! These tones in praise of love are nothing compared to the real thing; but if you continue to show your affection for me, I will strive to achieve a higher expression of the world's strongest force, and then the two of us together will rise higher and higher towards the goal, as we constantly aspire for love in life and in art."

In February 1897, in a letter to the Swedish composer Bror Beckman, Nielsen explained: "I really worked with this idea for a year or two, but it was only in the summer that I managed to begin writing the music. On 27 December the piece was finished and on 23 and 25 March it will be performed at the Music Society (Musikforeningen), probably conducted by myself."

The text for Hymnus amoris, initially wrriten in Danish by literary historian Axel Olrik on the basis of Carl Nielsen's own draft, was later translated into Latin by Johan Ludvig Heiberg. Nielsen justified his choice of Latin in a note on the score itself: "I think I can defend my choice of Latin by saying that this language is monumental and elevates one above over-lyrical or personal feelings which would be out of place where the object is to use a large polyphonic choir to describe such a universally human feeling as love. In addition, this language is more singable than Danish or German, and finally — as the most important reason — the textual repetitions are more tolerable in Latin."

== Reception ==
At the first performance of Hymnus amoris at the Music Society in Copenhagen on 27 April 1897 under the baton of the composer, the soloists were Tia Krëtma, Katie Adler and Viggo Bielefeldt. The programme presents the work with its Danish title Hymne til Kjærligheden (Hymn to Love), the Latin stanzas appearing alongside the Danish version in the programme.

The reviews were generally good. Writing in Dannebrog, Nanna Liebmann commented: "The young, talented composer, who yesterday evening also showed himself to be an energetic and assured conductor, has with this work indisputably risen many degrees in the judgment of the public. To a Latin text which depicts in short lines the stages of love in childhood, youth, manhood and old age, and finally ends as a hymn of praise in Heaven, Mr. Nielsen has written beautiful, natural and poetic music, which in its performance last evening could only have a directly appealing effect on the audience."

Berlingske Tidende’s H.W. Schytte commented specifically on the Latin: "The odd idea that a Danish poem should be translated into Latin to inspire our young Danish composer and our Music Society choir of young ladies and gentlemen at a time when Latin is close to being abolished in the learned schools, was something to which we at first had difficulty reconciling ourselves. But we hastened to drive away these reflections and found the idea in the text acquired by the composer attractive and well suited to a sufficiently gifted composer. We did not quite grasp the little instrumental beginning. It seemed to us that there was nothing to grasp, but with the first chorus our attention was immediately captured, and gradually we let Latin be Latin and listened only to the music, which maintained an interest that during the 25 minutes the piece lasted rather grew than diminished, despite the fact that the Brahms section had already given us much to think about."

Angul Hammerich writing in Nationaltidende was more effusive: "In his new choral work... (Nielsen) has become considerably more assured, more positive, more aware of his goals. He has therefore created a piece which as a work of art must be placed much higher than its predecessors." Charles Kjerulf in Politiken was highly critical of the Latin, asking why Nielsen: "wanted his thoughts and visions appareled in the shroud of a dead language." He continued: "Why on earth must this little true-born Dane Carl Nielsen, who just a few years ago appeared in an army band on Odense market-place, blowing the cornet or striking the triangle in military parades — why on earth does he need to have his feelings put into Latin to set a love-hymn to music? That is really not something he owes his fine, indisputable talent."

== Music ==
The 25-minute piece is divided into four sections:

- Barndom (Childhood): Children's choir; Mothers
- Ungdom (Youth): Tenor, soprano and choir
- Mandom (Manhood): Male choir; Soprano (an unhappy woman); Choir
- Alderdom (Old Age): Solo voices, tenor, baritone and bass (very old people); Choir (angels); Choir with soprano and tenor solo; Choir (all).
