= Erik Westberg =

Swedish conductor (born 1956)

Lars "Erik" Westberg (born 1 September 1956) is a Swedish conductor and professor in music performance. He studied choral conducting with Professor Eric Ericson at the Royal College of Music, Stockholm 1976–1987.

== Biography ==
Westberg was born in Stockholm. He has been the leader of numerous choirs, including the YMCA choir in Stockholm and the Oslo Philharmonic choir. He has also been guest conductor of the Swedish Radio Choir, Pro Coro Canada, Coro Nacional de España och Coro Sinfônica do Estado de São Paulo in Brazil, Jauna Muzika in Lithuania and artist in residence at Wollongong University in Australia 1997. In 2018 he was appointed conductor of the Swedish Youth Choir.

Westberg was the founder of the project "Choral Singing for Peace and Justice": during the millennium celebrations, 8,000 choristers in 56 countries were involved in this project, singing the twelve-year old Irishman Shaun McLaughlin's poem "Across the Bridge of Hope", set to music by Jan Sandström. Also, the Erik Westberg Vocal Ensemble first held a concert with this centerpiece at Tonga, the first country in the world to enter the new millennium. Then, the morning after, they flew to Samoa – the last country to enter the new millennium and therefore "they arrived the day before they left" – and once again the Vocal Ensemble held the concert, as a symbol for the encircling of time.

The Tonga concert was broadcast by the BBC and the transmission was seen by more than 500 million people. The project was supported, by the past present, Secretary-General of the United Nations Mr. Kofi Annan, President of Ireland Mary McAleese, Queen Silvia of Sweden, and King Tāufaʻahau Tupou IV of Tonga.

Westberg initiated the Barents International Centre for Choral Music 2003 which was inaugurated by the minister of culture Marita Ulvskog and the Barents International Chamber Choir, a professional choir with singers from Norway, Sweden, Finland och Russia. 2008 Westberg was elected a member of the Royal Swedish Academy of Music. Autumn 2009 he was a visiting professor at Wesleyan University in Connecticut, USA.

Together with Benny Andersson, Orsa spelmän and Gunnar Idenstam, Westberg conducted The University Chamber Choir in Piteå when they premiered Benny Andersson's, for the occasion commissioned work, En skrift i snön [Scriptures in the snow] (lyrics by Kristina Lugn) during the inauguration ceremony of Organ Acusticum in Studio Acusticum 2012.

With The University Chamber Choir in Piteå and the Erik Westberg Vocal Ensemble, he has performed over 50 tours to Europa, North- and South America and Asia. With the Erik Westberg Vocal Ensemble he has premiered over 60 works by, among others: B Tommy Andersson, Gunnar Eriksson, Mats Larsson Gothe, Paula af Malmborg Ward, Jan Sandström, Sven-David Sandström and Arvo Pärt. His audio catalog includes more than twenty recordings from the record labels Studio Acusticum Records, Opus3, Naxos, and Caprice, several of which has received excellent reviews.

Since 1990, Westberg has primarily worked at Luleå University of Technology/School of Music in Piteå as professor in music performance.

== Conducting activities ==
- The YMCA choir in Stockholm (1982–1987)
- Oslo Philharmonic choir (1987–1989)
- The University Chamber Choir in Piteå (1990–)
- Erik Westberg Vocal Ensemble (1993–)
- Barents International Chamber Choir, the Barents International Vocal Ensemble (2003–2007)
- Swedish Youth Choir, (2018–2021)
- Arctic Male Voices, (2018)

== Discography ==
- 1994 – En hälsning från Musikhögskolan i Piteå, The University Chamber Choir in Piteå, etc. Luleå University of Technology.
- 1995 – Fancy's Child, Pro Coro Canada, conductors Eric Ericson and Erik Westberg. Arktos.
- 1996 – Musica Sacra, the Erik Westberg Vocal Ensemble with Mattias Wager (organ) and Anders Paulsson (soprano saxophone). Opus3.
- 1999 – Den blomstertid nu kommer, The University Chamber Choir in Piteå. Luleå University of Technology.
- 2000 – Across the Bridge of Hope, the Erik Westberg Vocal Ensemble, Carmina Slovenica (Slovenia), Pritcha, Tatarstan (Russia). Luleå University of Technology. [DVD]
- 2002 – Across the Bridge of Hope, the Erik Westberg Vocal Ensemble. Opus3.
- 2003 – Music for a while, The University Chamber Choir in Piteå. Luleå University of Technology.
- 2004 – A Star is Shining, the Erik Westberg Vocal Ensemble, Mattias Wager (organ), Anders Åstrand and Daniel Saur (percussion), Daniel Pettersson (key fiddle). Opus3.
- 2005 – In Concert, Barents International Chamber Choir. Caprice Records.
- 2007 – En ny himmel, The University Chamber Choir in Piteå with Markus Rupprecht, organ. Luleå University of Technology.
- 2009 – Peterson-Berger, the Erik Westberg Vocal Ensemble, The University Chamber Choir in Piteå. Naxos Records.
- 2009 – Shiloh, the Erik Westberg Vocal Ensemble with band, orchestra, etc. Usiogope.
- 2010 – Korall, The University Chamber Choir in Piteå, conductors Anders Nyberg and Erik Westberg. Peace of Music.
- 2010 – Pater Cælestis – Terra Mater – Vox Humana (CD-box), the Erik Westberg Vocal Ensemble with Matti Hirvonen (piano), Lars Nilsson (organ), Mårten Landström (piano) and David Wahlén (ackordeon), Studio Acusticum Records.
- 2012 – Arabesques, the Erik Westberg Vocal Ensemble with Norrbotten NEO. Studio Acusticum Records.
- 2013 – Dreamlike, the Erik Westberg Vocal Ensemble with Helge Kjekshus, piano. Studio Acusticum Records.
- 2014 – Acqua Alta, Serikon, music director Daniel Stighäll, conductor Erik Westberg. Footprint Records.
- 2014 – Originals, the Erik Westberg Vocal Ensemble with Mattias Wager (organ) and Carl-Henrik Fernandi (soprano saxophone). Studio Acusticum Records.
- 2015 – To see a World, The University Chamber Choir in Piteå with Gabriel Kopparmark, piano. Studio Acusticum Records.
- 2015 – Vita Nuova, the Erik Westberg Vocal Ensemble with Helge Kjekshus (piano), Daniel Saur (percussion) and Mattias Wager (organ). Studio Acusticum Records.
- 2017 – Chorus Gloriosus, the Erik Westberg Vocal Ensemble with Helena Holmlund (organ). Studio Acusticum Records.
- 2018 – Amor Vita Mors, the Erik Westberg Vocal Ensemble. Studio Acusticum Records.
- 2019 – A Voice for Humanity, the Swedish Youth Choir. Studio Acusticum Records.
- 2019 – The Voice of the Viola, the Erik Westberg Vocal Ensemble. Kim Hellgren (viola) Studio Acusticum Records
- 2019 – J.S. Bach B minor Mass, Ingela Bohlin (soprano), Anna Zander Sand (alto), Johan Christensson (tenor), Jakob Bloch Jespersen (bass), Erik Westberg Vocal Ensemble, Vocal Art (Norway), Swedish Baroque Orchestra, Studio Acusticum Records
- 2021 – Andreas Hallén´s Missa Solemnis, the Erik Westberg Vocal Ensemble, Pia-Karin Helsing (soprano), Maria Forsström (alto), Conny Thimander (tenor), Andreas E. Olsson (bass), Lars Nilsson (organ), James Jenkins (piano), Lars Sjöstedt (celesta), Naxos
- 2021 – Örjan Fahlström's POESIS, Norrbotten Big Band, the Erik Westberg Vocal Ensemble, Naxos
- 2021 – Lyssna till jorden [EP]. The Swedish Youth Choir. UNGiKÖR
- 2022 – SÁPMIE – Frode Fjellheim (joik, synt), Katarina Barruk (jojk/solo), David Wahlén (ackordeon), the Erik Westberg Vocal Ensemble, Naxos/Swedish Society
- 2022 – The Cloud of Unknowing – Markus Wargh & Aaron Sunstein (organ), Kim Hellgren (viola), Erik Westberg Vocal Ensemble, Naxos/Swedish Society
- 2022 – Papillon – Hugo Alfvén, Works for mixed choir a cappella, the Erik Westberg Vocal Ensemble, Naxos/Swedish Society
- 2024 – Longing – Between Silence and Song is Love, the Erik Westberg Vocal Ensemble, Naxos/Swedish Socie
- 2024 – Staffan Storm – Choral Works, Kim Hellgren, viola, Daniel Saur, percussion, the Erik Westberg Vocal Ensemble, Naxos/Swedish Society

== Awards ==
- 1988 – Sweden–America Foundation's scholarship for international studies
- 1990 – Luleå University of Technology's "teacher of the year" for "his excellent contributions to the undergraduate education"
- 1992 – Royal College of Music, Stockholm's conductor scholarship
- 1993 – the Johannes Norrby-medallion
- 1997 – Norrländska Socialdemokraten's culture award
- 1999 – Choir conductor of the year by Swedish Choral Directors Association
- 2002 – Piteå Municipality's culture award
- 2005 – The Academy of Norrbotten's SKUM-award
- 2005 – Rosenborg-Gehrman’s choral conductor award
- 2006 – H. M. The King's Medal in gold of the Eighth Size with the ribbon of the Order of the Seraphim
- 2009 – The Swedish Foundation for International Cooperation in Research and Higher Education's Excellence in Teaching-award
- 2016 – Grant of Honour and Merit "for many years of valuable contributions to the cultural life of Norrbotten County".
- 2017 – Governor Kari Marklund's scholarship
- 2018 – Piteå Walk of Fame
- 2020 – Price of Interpretation to Erik Westberg Vocal Ensemble from the Society of Swedish Composers
