= Anton Jörgen Andersen =

Norwegian composer and cellist

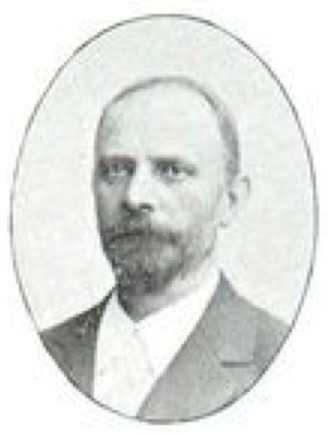
Anton Jörgen Andersen.

Anton Jørgen Andersen (Swedish:Anton Jörgen Andersen; 10 October 1845 – 9 September 1926) was a Norwegian composer and cellist.

Anton Jørgen Andersen was born in Kristiansand. Andersen was a pupil in counterpoint by Johan Lindegren (1842-1908), Swedish music theorist and hymn-book publisher. Andersen was a cellist in the theater orchestras of Trondheim (1865) and Kristiania (now Oslo).

In 1871, Andersen was employed at the Royal Court Orchestra (Kungliga Hovkapellet) in Stockholm. He became first cellist and violinist in the court orchestra in Stockholm (kammarmusikus i hovkapellet) in 1876. From 1876 to 1911, Andersen taught cello and double bass at the Stockholm Conservatory, where he was appointed professor in 1912. In 1882, he became a member of the Royal Swedish Academy of Music (Kungliga Musikaliska Akademien).

His compositions include a cello sonata (1877), a concert piece for cello and double bass, and five symphonies (one of which was scored for 14 cellos and 3 double basses), as well as pieces for piano and songs for male choir.
