= Fanny Stål =

Fanny Stål (4 October 1821 – 21 March 1889) was a Swedish classical pianist.

Fanny Stål was born in Stockholm, the daughter of the language teacher Axel Samuel Stål, paternal niece of the architect Carl Stål, the musician Conrad Stål and the merchant Pehr Christian Stål.

She was a student of Jan van Boom and Wilhelm Bauck in Stockholm and, during the 1840s, of Frédéric Chopin in Paris, along Henriette Nissen-Saloman his likely only Swedish students. She became one of the most noted Swedish pianists in mid-19th century Sweden. She gave her most noted concert in Stora Börssalen in Stockholm in 1859, with compositions of Johann Nepomuk Hummel, Sigismund Thalberg and Chopin. She died in Västerås.

== Sources ==
- Musik-Lexikon
- Fanny Stål at Svenskt kvinnobiografiskt lexikon
- Tore Uppström: Pianister i Sverige
