= Åke Uddén =

Swedish musician (1903–1987)

Åke Olof Sebastian Uddén (18 August 1903 – 28 April 1987) was a Swedish violist, composer, conductor and music educator.

Uddén was born in Lossa (now Låssa), Upplands-Bro Municipality, Stockholm County. He studied in Stockholm with Henrik Melcher Melchers and Julius Ruthström, and subsequently from 1926 to 1928 with Georges Caussade and Charles Tournemire at the Conservatoire de Paris.

Uddén played viola in the Swedish Radio Symphony Orchestra from 1943 until 1956. He was a teacher of counterpoint at the Royal College of Music from 1934 to 1970, and was also conductor of the Stockholm Academic Orchestra (1955–1985). One of his pupils was composer Hans Eklund.

His limited output, influenced by French music, includes a number of orchestral, vocal and chamber music works, among them a string trio written during his studies in Paris, and two string quartets. He died in Stockholm.

== Selected works ==
Orchestral

- Nocturne
- Vår (Spring) for chamber orchestra
- Menuett (1932)
- Saraband
- Gavotte (1935)
- Lustspels-Uvertyr (Comic Overture) (1935, revised 1950)
- Introitus academicus (1971)

Chamber music

- String Trio (1928)
- Sonata in D major for flute and viola, Op.2 (1931)
- Duo "Småprat" (Small Talk) for 2 violas (1933)
- Sonatina for viola solo, Op. 3 (1933, revised 1986)
- String Quartet No. 1 (1940)
- String Quartet No. 2 (1956)

Vocal

- Är jag intill döden trött (I Am Tired unto Death) for voice and chamber orchestra (1930); words by Harriet Löwenhjelm
- En gammal vårvisa (An Old Spring Song) for 3 female voices and piano (1939)
- Midsommarvisa: Folkvisa från Västmanland (Folk Tune from Västmanland) for 3 female voices and piano (1939)
- Tre sånger ur Chansons de Bilitis (3 Songs from Chansons de Bilitis) for voice and piano (1941–1945); words by Pierre Louÿs
- Nocturne for tenor and piano (1946)

== Sources ==
- Lönn, Anders, "Åke Uddén", in The New Grove Dictionary of Music and Musicians, 20 vols., ed. Stanley Sadie, London: Macmillan, 1980. ISBN 0-333-23111-2.
- Swedish Music Information Centre: Åke Uddén biography
