= Gustav Stolpe =

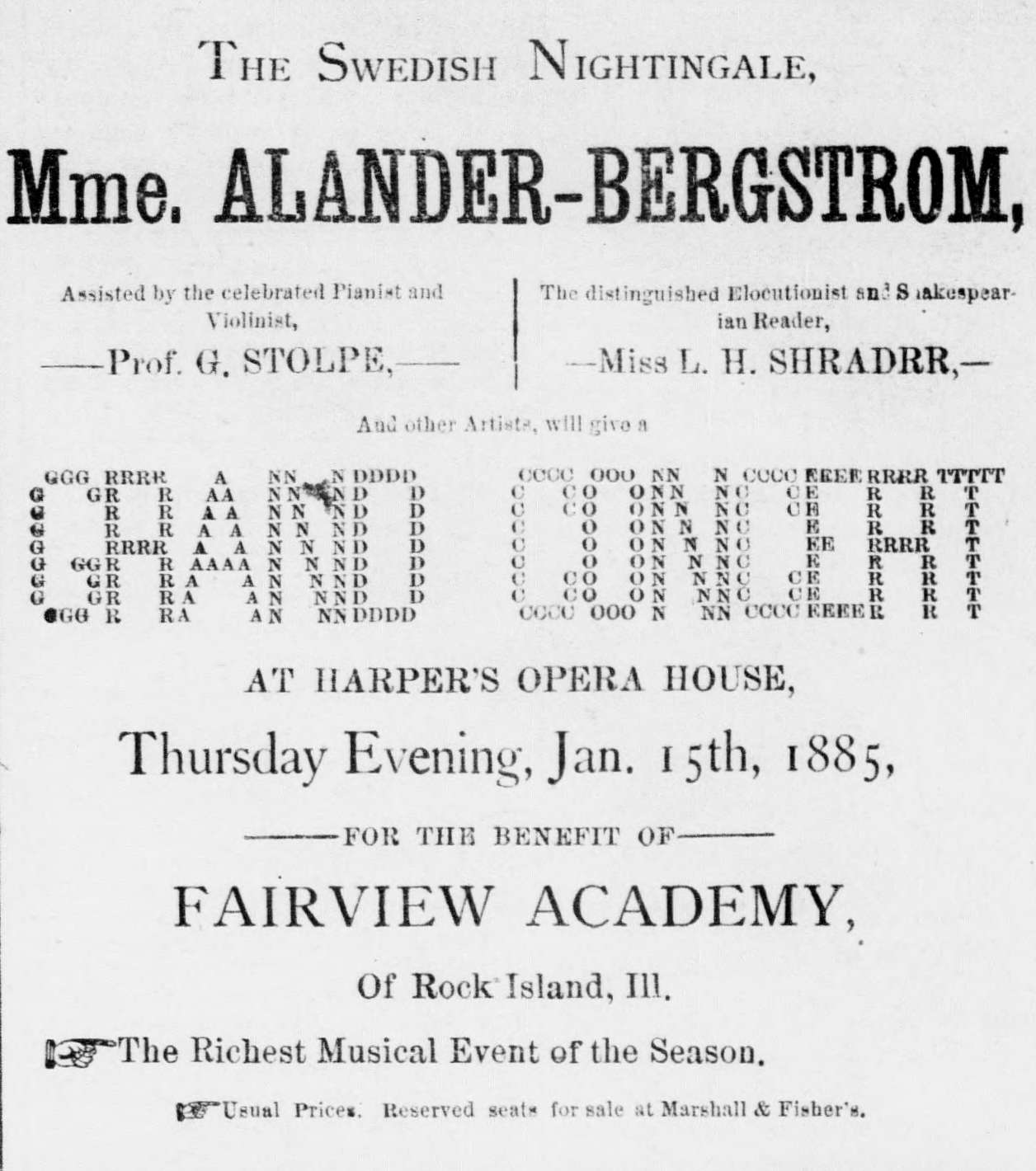
Stolpe in concert at the Harper's Opera House, 1885

Gustav Erik Stolpe (26 September 1833 – 3 October 1901) was a Swedish-American composer, conductor, and performer.

== Career ==
Stolpe was born in Torsåker Parish, Gästrikland, Sweden. He held the degree of Musikdirektör (music director) from the Royal Swedish Academy of Music (now Royal College of Music in Stockholm).

Stolpe is most frequently remembered as the composer of When Through the Torn Sail which was written with lyricist, Reginald Heber.

In 1882 Stolpe was named to the faculty of Augustana College, in Rock Island, Illinois, where he remained on the faculty for 11 years. In a typical week, he would teach seven organ lessons, six violin lessons, and ten vocal lessons. His work papers are included in the Manuscript Collections in the Thomas Tredway Library at Augustana College.

In 1893, he founded Dr. Stolpe's Music Conservatory in Moline, Illinois, and headed it until 1897, when he left to become head of music at Upsala College in Kenilworth, New Jersey.

=== Legacy ===
Stolpe composed 38 operettas, 25 orchestral works, 25 pieces for brass band, and 25 piano solos.

== Family ==
One of his sons, Rev. Dr. Johan Gustaf Mauritz Stolpe (1858–1938), had been the rector of Gustavus Adolphus Lutheran Church in Manhattan, New York City, at 155 East 22nd Street (between Lexington and Third Avenues), which in 1901, was the largest church of the denomination in the United States.

=== Death ===
Stolpe died 3 October 1901, in Manhattan, New York City. At the time of his death, he was head of music at Upsala College.

== Sources ==
- Gustav Erik Stolpe biography on the Augustana College website
- Olson, Ernst W. The Swedish Element in Illinois Survey of the Past Seven Decades (Chicago: Swedish-American Biographical Association. 1917)
