= Jacob Adolf Hägg =

Swedish composer (1850–1928)

Jacob Adolf Hägg (29 June 1850 – 1 March 1928) was a Swedish composer.

Hägg was born in Östergarn, and studied piano at the Stockholm Conservatory from 1865 to 1870, as well as composition in Copenhagen with Niels Wilhelm Gade and in Berlin with Friedrich Kiel. Due to mental illness, he spent the years 1880 to 1895 in a hospital. He then worked as a pianist and composer in Hedvigsfors, Sweden, and continued to do so after moving to Norway between 1900 and 1909 and resettling in Sweden at Hudiksvall. He died in Bjuråker.

Hägg composed four symphonies and other orchestral and choral works, chamber music, a collection of Little Nordic Songs without Words for piano, ten piano suites, and pieces for cello and for organ.

He was related to the composer Gustaf Hägg (1867–1925) in that Jacob's father was a cousin twice removed of Gustaf's grandfather.
