= Ruth Almén =

Swedish writer and composer (1870–1945)

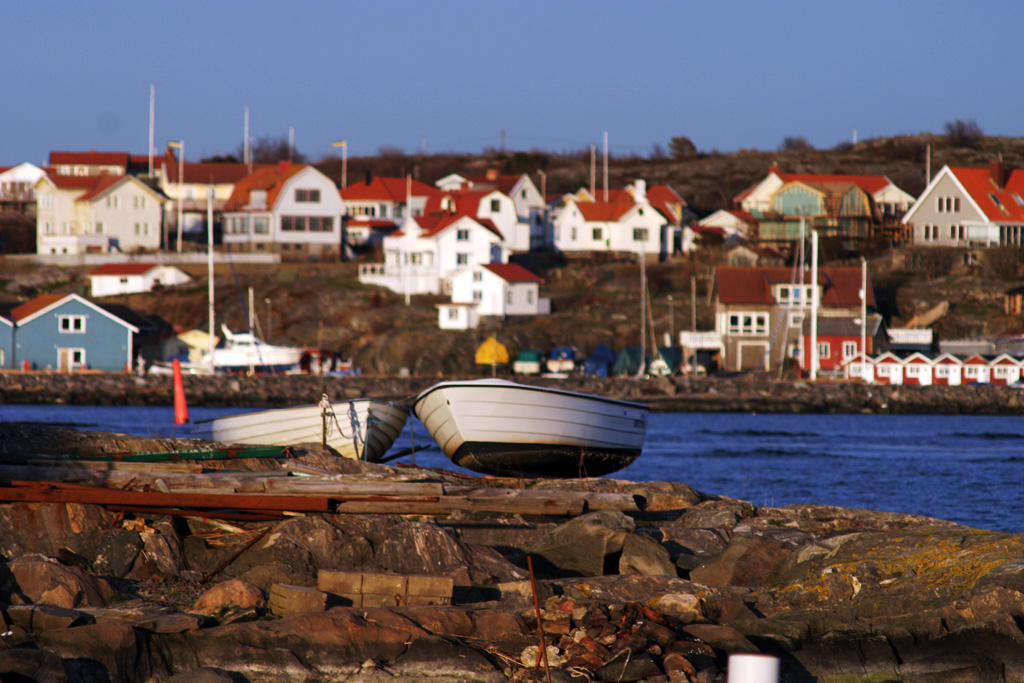
Bohuslän, Almén's birthplace.

Ruth Sofia Almén (pen name Runar Alm; 24 September 1870 – 19 November 1945), was a Swedish composer, pianist, teacher, author and poet. She published a number of compositions, including nine songs, piano and violin sonatas, and a concerto for piano and orchestra. She also published a collection of poetry, journal articles, and children's stories.

== Biography ==
Almén was born in Solberga rectory, Kålltorp, Bohuslän on 24 September 1870. Her father was a vicar. Her younger brother was author Sigge Almén. She studied counterpoint with Wilhelm Stenhammar in Gothenburg, harmony with Gustaf Hägg in Stockholm, composition with Franz Neruda and Knud Jeppesen in Copenhagen, and instrumentation with Karl Westermeyer in Berlin. She also studied piano with Richard Andersson in Stockholm, Knut Bäck in Gothenburg, Heinrich Barth in Berlin, and Robert Lortat in Paris. Almén was active as a musical teacher in Gothenburg.

In addition to her playing and teaching music, Almén was also a writer and poet. She published a collection of poems in 1895, Vid synranden, under the name Runar Alm, a pseudonym she continued to use until 1904. Almén also published children's stories and articles.

Almén died in Johanneberg, Gothenburg, in 1945.

== Musical work ==
Almén's compositions are in the late romantic style, and include two piano sonatas, a violin sonata, piano pieces and nine songs, as well as a concerto for piano and orchestra. Her piano sonata op. 2, violin sonata and a group of songs were performed in the Salle Pleyel in Paris on 8 June 1921, and at the Gothenburg Concert Hall on 20 January 1922.

- Sonata op. 1
- Sonata op. 2
- Violinsonat a-moll op 3
- Preludium und Sarabande für Klavier op. 4
- Drei Praeludien für Klavier Op. 5
- Pianokonsert (Pianoconcert)
