= Ture Rangström =

Swedish composer (1884–1947)

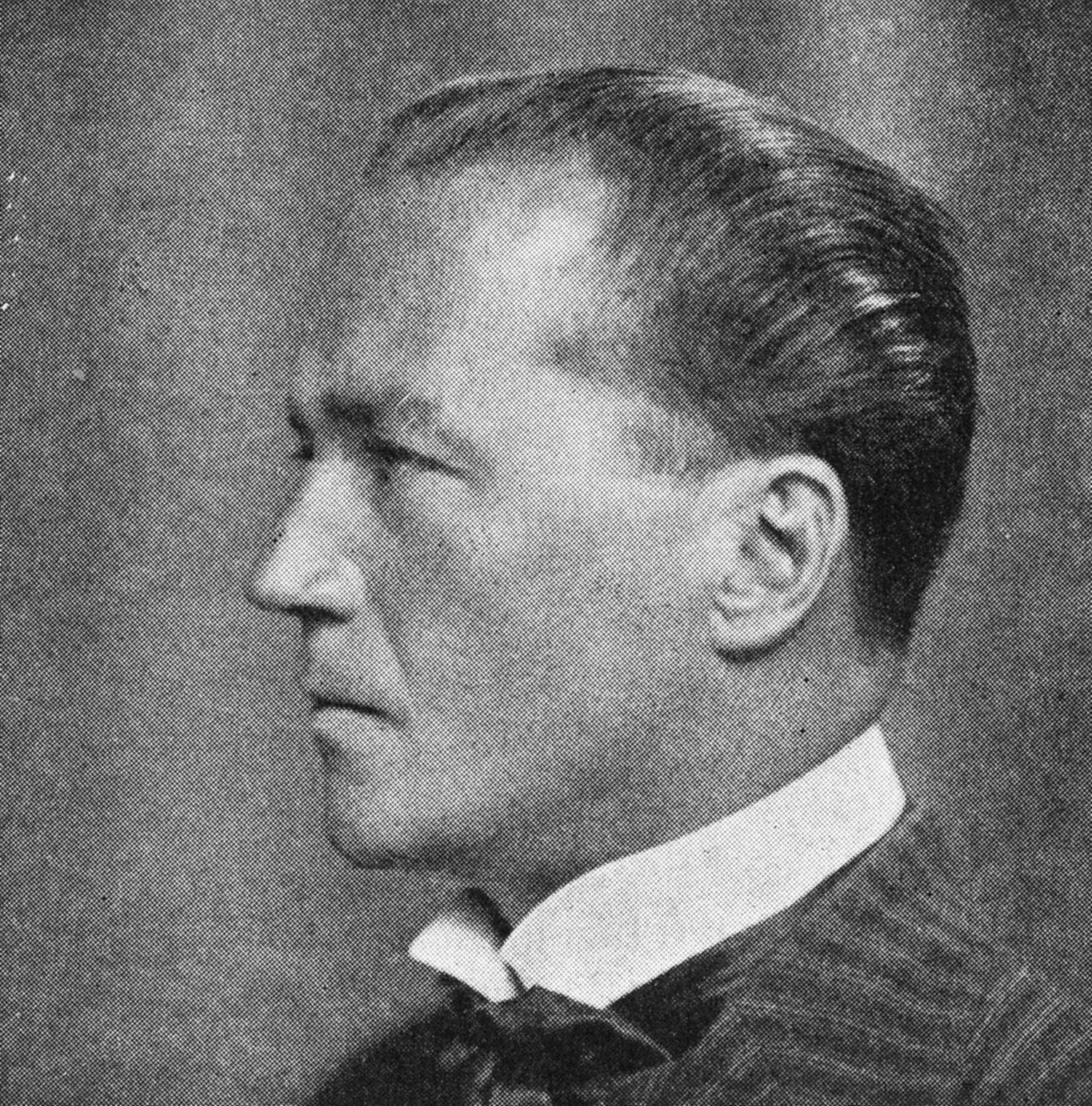
Ture Rangström

Anders Johan Ture Rangström (30 November 1884 – 11 May 1947) belonged to a new generation of Swedish composers who, in the first decade of the 20th century, introduced modernism to their compositions. In addition to composing, Rangström was also a musical critic and conductor.

== Biography ==
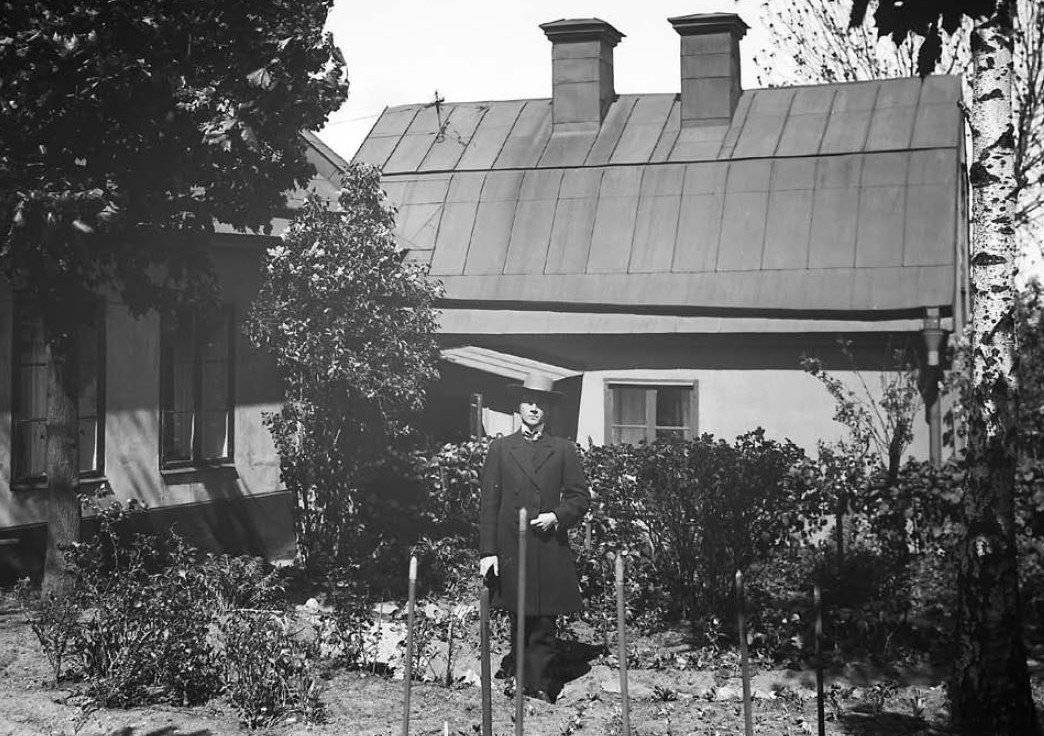
Rangström in front of Rangströmska Farm on Södermalm, 1918.

Rangström was born in Stockholm, where in his late teens he started to write songs. His music teacher suggested that he should "vary the harmonies a bit more, make it a bit wilder!" He followed this advice and soon gained the nickname among his colleagues of "Sturm-und-Drangström". He travelled to Berlin where he studied under Hans Pfitzner for a while in 1905–6, and also studied singing with the Wagnerian Julius Hey, with whom he later went to Munich for further studies. His compositions at this time were chiefly for voice and piano.

Between 1907 and 1922 he taught singing and from 1922 to 1925 he was principal conductor of the Gothenburg Symphony Orchestra. He founded the Swedish Society of Composers in 1918, and he was employed to promote the works of the Royal Swedish Opera from 1931 to 1936. After this he worked freelance and spent the summers on the island of Törnsholmen which he had been given by the people of Sweden who raised the money to celebrate his fiftieth birthday.

Rangström died at his home in Stockholm after a long illness caused by a throat disease; his funeral was held at Stockholm's Maria Magdalena Church and he is buried in the churchyard at Gryt, Valdemarsvik Municipality, Östergötland County, southeast Sweden. He was grandfather of a playwright, also named Ture Rangström (born in 1944) the artistic director of Strindbergs Intima Teater (since its re-opening in 2003), and uncle of author Lars Gyllensten.

== Works ==
Many of his early works took the form of symphonic poems, including Dityramb (Dithyramb) (1909), an ancient Greek hymn sung and danced in honor of Dionysus, the god of wine and fertility; the term was also used as an epithet of the god, Ett midsommarstycke (A midsummer piece) and En höstsång (An autumn song). Following the success of these poems, Rangström began work on his symphonies, of which there are four. The first, produced in 1914, is dedicated to the memory of Strindberg – August Strindberg in memoriam; the second, from 1919, is entitled Mitt land (My country); the third, a single moment work, from 1929, Sång under stjärnorna (Song under the stars), and the fourth from 1936, Invocatio, for orchestra and organ.

He composed three operas, entitled Kronbruden (The Crown Bride), based on a play by Strindberg, which was first performed in 1915, Medeltida (Medieval), published in 1921, and Gilgamesj, based on the Mesopotamian Epic of Gilgamesh, written during the last years of his life. The orchestration of Gilgamesj was completed by the composer John Fernström, and it was premièred in November 1952 at the Royal Swedish Opera with Erik Saedén in the title role and Herbert Sandberg conducting. Rangström also wrote almost 300 songs and orchestrated about 60 of them.

=== Orchestral ===
- Dithyramb, symphonic poem, 1909 (revised by Kurt Atterberg, 1948)
- Ett midsommarstycke, symphonic poem, 1910
- En höstsång, symphonic poem, 1911
- Havet sjunger, symphonic poem, 1913
- Symphony no. 1 in C-sharp minor, August Strindberg in memoriam, 1914
- Intermezzo drammatico, suite, 1916–18
- Divertimento elegiaco, suite for string orchestra, 1918
- Två melodier, clarinet and strings, 1919
- Symphony no. 2 in D minor, Mitt land, 1919
- Två svenska folkmelodier, 1928
- Symphony no. 3 in D flat Sång under stjärnorna, 1929
- Partita for violin and orchestra in B minor, 1933
- Symphony no. 4 in D minor Invocatio, 1935
- Ballade for piano and orchestra, 1937
- Vauxhall, suite 1937
- Staden spelar, divertissement, 1940

=== Chamber music ===
- String quartet in G minor, Ein Nachtstück in ETA Hoffmanns Manier, 1909 (rev. Edvin Kallstenius and Kurt Atterberg 1948)
- Suite in modo antico, violin and piano, 1912
- Suite in modo barocco, violin and piano, 1920–22

=== Piano ===
- Fyra preludier, 1910–13
- Mälarlegender, 1919
- Sommarskyar, 1916–20
- Improvisata, 1927
- Sonatin, 1937
- Spelmansvår, suite, 1943
