= Fredrik Wetterqvist =

Swedish diplomat and music administrator

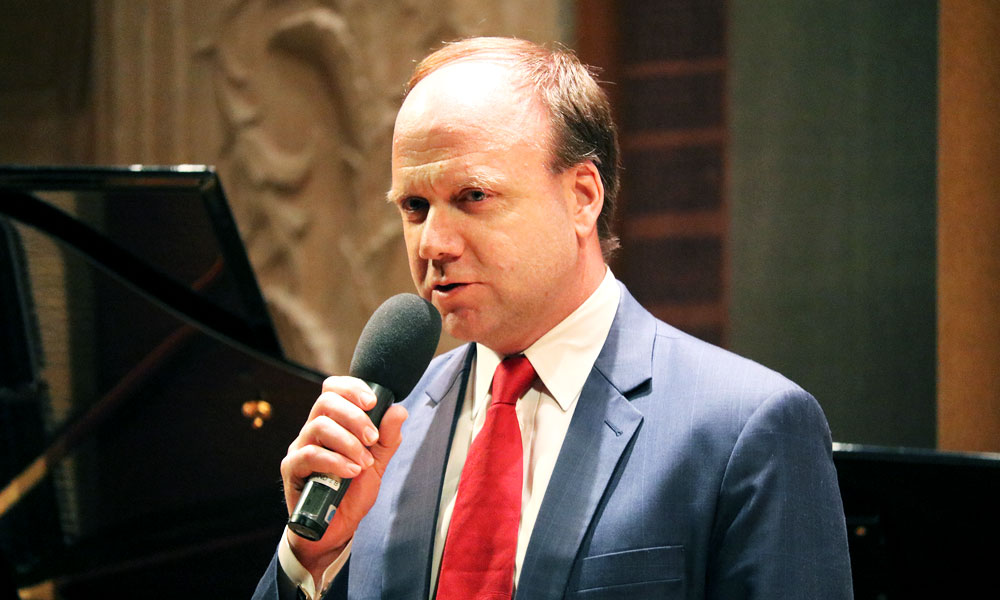

Permanent Secretary of the Royal Swedish Academy of Music

Personal details
- Born: 20 September 1965 (age 61)
- Occupation: diplomat

Fredrik Wetterqvist (born 20 September 1965 in Uppsala) is a Swedish diplomat and music administrator.

Fredrik Wetterqvist has been the Permanent Secretary of the Royal Swedish Academy of Music since 2017. Previously he was active as a diplomat at the Swedish Ministry for Foreign Affairs, where he worked on questions related to the press, culture, and communication, as well as security policy. From 1998 to 2002 Wetterqvist was the First Secretary at the Swedish Embassy in Ottawa, and from 1995 to 1997, the Second Secretary at the Swedish Embassy in Tallinn.

From 2012 to 2016 Wetterqvist was the chair of Music Promotion Council at the Swedish Performing Rights Society (STIM). He also co-authored the Government Inquiry into International Cultural Relations, and was an expert for the Government Inquiry into Literature, “The Culture of Reading”

== Selected bibliography ==
- Wetterqvist, Fredrik (1990). French security and defence policy: current developments and future prospects. FOA report. C. 1, 0281-0247; 10325. Stockholm: Dept. of Defence Analysis, National Defence Research Institute [Huvudavd. för försvarsanalys, FOA]. Libris 901316
- Wetterqvist, Fredrik; Johansson Lennart (1991). Kriget vid Persiska viken 1990-91: förlopp, ärdomar och slutsatser. FOA report. A. 1, 0281-0204; 10026–1.4. Sundbyberg: Huvudavd. för försvarsanalys, FOA. Libris 1286478
- “Case Study of the Swedish Fighter Aircraft JAS Griffin” with Elisabeth Sköns in Forsberg Randall, ed. (1994). The arms production dilemma: contraction and restraint in the world combat aircraft industry. CSIA studies in international security, 99-2091510-6; 7. Cambridge, Mass.: MIT Press. Libris 4738461. ISBN 0-262-06176-7
- Wetterqvist, Fredrik (1992). Försvarsindustriellt samarbete i Europa - organisationen IEPG. FOA report. A. 1, 0281-0204; 10032–1.3. Sundbyberg: Institution 13, Huvudavd. för försvarsanalys, FOA. Libris 1440383
- Internationella kulturutredningen (2003). Internationella kulturutredningen 2003: betänkande. Statens offentliga utredningar, 0375-250X; 2003:121. Stockholm: Fritzes offentliga publikationer. Libris 9294871. ISBN 91-38-22046-6

== Selected memberships and elected board positions ==
=== Current ===
- Birgit Nilsson Foundation
- Board of Directors for The Schock Foundation (Rolf Schock Prizes)
- The Karl XIV Johan Society
- The Hugo Alfvén fund
- The Foundation for the Future in Stockholm County
- The Choral Society Orphei Drängar
- The Mixed University Choir Allmänna Sången (Distinguished Member)

=== Previous ===
- Expert, Swedish Defence Commission
- Executive member, Committee for the Promotion of Sweden Abroad (Nämnden för Sverigefrämjande i utlandet, NSU), 2004-2012
- Chair, NSU's Chief Information Officer's Group 2004-2012
- Secretary and member, Jury for the Government Music Export Prize 2006-2012
- Member, The Executive Committee for the Raoul Wallenberg Year 2012
- Member, Delegation for the Swedish Language in Finland ”Svenskanu.fi” 2007-2012
- Sekretary, National committee for Sweden's Participation in EXPO 2010 Shanghai (2008-2011)

== Honours and Distinctions ==
- 1995 – The Order of the White Star, VII degree, Estonia
- 1995 – Officer's cross of The Order of the Lithuanian Grand Duke Gediminas, Lithuania
