= Carl Unander-Scharin =

Swedish opera singer

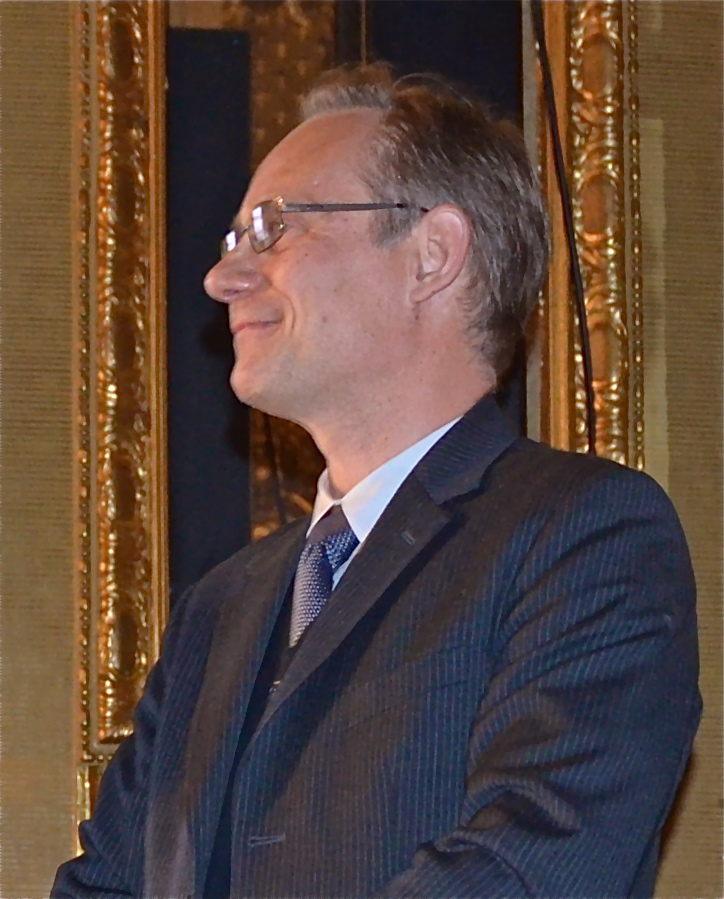
Carl Unander-Scharin at the Royal Opera in Stockholm in 2012.

Carl Unander-Scharin (born 1964) is a Swedish opera singer, composer, professor, and researcher.

== Early years ==
He was born in Stockholm in 1964 and studied at the Royal College of Music and at the University College of Opera, Stockholm, where he acquired a Master of Fine Arts in Church Music in 1991. He studied organ under Hans Fagius, conducting under Eric Ericson, Gustaf Sjökvist and Jorma Panula, singing for Solwig Grippe, Hans Gertz, Nicolai Gedda, Erik Saedén and Gösta Winbergh.

Between 1991 and 1995, he studied at The University College of Opera in Stockholm where he acquired a diploma in Operatic singing. Carl also holds a teacher's degree as well as a choral conductor's degree, both from the Royal College of Music. In 2015, he defended his PhD thesis "Extending Opera" at KTH The Royal Institute of Technology. In 2015, he was appointed a member of the Royal Academy of Music. In 2023, he was named "KTH's Alumnus of the Year - opera's tech rebel".

== Singing career ==
He has a parallel career as a composer and as a lyric tenor. Having sung roles at many Swedish venues such as the Folkoperan and the Vadstena-Academy, during 2000 to 2011 he was a tenor soloist at the Royal Opera in Stockholm, where he appeared 355 performances in 25 roles, including Tamino (Mozart's Die Zauberflöte), Almaviva (Rossini's Il Barbiere da Siviglia), Raoul de Gardefeu (Offenbachs La Vie Parisienne), The Fisherman (Stravinsky´s The Nightingale), Ferrando (Mozart´s Così fan tutte) and Gonzalve (Ravel's L'heure Espagnole). During 2009, he appeared as Nadir in George Bizet's Les Pêcheurs de Perles at Folkoperan. He is continuously performing in concerts and oratorios, especially in Bach’s tenor parts in the Passions and oratorios. He was Faust in the rarely performed Faust et Helène by Nadia Boulanger at Malmö Opera during winter 2014.

== Discography ==
- 1988 – Stellan Sagvik: Efter passionen (tenorsolist) (NOSAGCD008)
- 1989 – The splendours of Felicity (tenorsolist), Musica Sveciae Records, Stockholm, Sweden (MSCD 904)
- 1990 – Andeliga sånger (tenorsolist), Musica Svecia Records, Stockholm, Sweden (MSCD115)
- 1991: Piae Cantiones (tenorsolist), Musica Sveciae Records, Stockholm, Sweden

(MSCD 201)

- 1993 – Ingvar Lidholm: Ett Drömspel (tenorsolist), Caprice Records, Stockholm,

Sweden (CAP22029)

- 1996 – Actus Tragicus (tenorsolist), Forked Fingers production, Stockholm, Sweden

(Forked Fingers CD 001)

- 1997 – Nils Lindberg: Carpe Diem (tenorsolist), Ladybird Records, Stockholm

Sweden (LBCD0024)

- 1998 – Tokfursten (tonsättare), Caprice (CAP 22046)
- 2000 – Figurer i ett landskap (tonsättare),(EORCD 001)
- 2000 – Soberana (tonsättare, Anagram CD 49)
- 2003 – Henk Badings Liedercyklus (FRCD008)
- 2007 – 40 Summers of Opera (dBCD116-119)
- 2008 – Stockholms gosskör live (tonsättare, Nosag CD 155)
- 2012 – JS Bach: h-moll mässan (tenorsolist, LVE-8)
- 2016 – Sixten: St John passion (tenorsolist, Ictus, CD IMP1619)
- 2022 – The Cloud of Unknowing (tonsättare, Swedish Society. SCD1185)

== Career as a composer ==
Carl Unander-Scharin is a composer of operas, electronic/interactive music and spiritual music. His radio-opera Mannen på Sluttningen (The Man on the Hillside) represented the Swedish Broadcasting union in Prix Italia in 1991.

His first opera for the stage - Tokfursten (The King of Fools) was premiered in Vadstena in July 1996 and was released on CD (CAP 22046).

The song cycle for radio, Figures in a landscape was commissioned by the Swedish Broadcasting Union and awarded an honorary mention in Prix Italia, 1999.

Lysistrate, his third opera, was commissioned by the University College of Opera and premiered in June 1998. This opera was staged in Oslo in April 2002.

In September 2001, his fourth opera, Hummelhonung (Sweetness) was staged by the Stockholm Royal Opera.

At the castle in Vadstena, his fifth opera Byrgitta had its world premiere 26 July 2003. This opera is based on the life of Birgitta Birgersdotter.

The oratorio Apostlagärning (Acts) received its first performance in May 2004 and was broadcast on the radio and web. It was encored in 2006 and selected to represent the future possibilities of oratorio writing by the Church of Sweden's cultural council.

His sixth opera, a commission from the Royal Opera in Stockholm, had its premiere in December 2006. It is a comic opera for children and others, Loranga, Masarin and Dartanjang, based on books by Barbro Lindgren.

In August 2006, the third motet Spiritual Exercises was premiered by the Swedish Radio choir, conducted by Peter Dijkstra.

For the Kroumata percussion ensemble and the Swedish soprano Erika Sunnegårdh he wrote The World As I see It with texts by Albert Einstein. This piece was selected by Swedish Radio to be presented at Rostrum 2007.

The choral work To The Unknown God was premiered in May 2007 by St. Jakobs Chamberchoir under Gary Graden.

The interactive Dreamplay The Crystal Cabinet was premiered by Piteå Chamber Opera and toured the north of Sweden in the fall of 2008.

From 2007 to 2009, Carl Unander-Scharin was composer-in-residence at the Gothenburg Opera House, where the opera thriller The Insomnia Clinic/ Sömnkliniken was premiered in February 2009. It was a collaboration with Alexander Ahndoril.

In the fall of 2010 Medmänniskor/ Mankind (an oratorio with texts by Stefan Einhorn) was given its first performance in the Berwaldhall by The Swedish Radio Choir under Peter Dijkstra.

The Elephant-Man, his ninth opera with a libretto by Michael Williams, was commissioned and performed by NorrlandsOperan in 2012.

The dance Artificial Body Voices was created in collaboration with Åsa Unander-Scharin, Lene Juhl and Mark Viktov in 2011 and shown on Swedish Television as well as at the Studio Acusticum in Piteå.

The interactive exhibition Opera Mecatronica was premiered in the Reactorhall at KTH in November 2010 and has since then been presented at Operadagen Rotterdam, the Royal Opera in Stockholm. Parts of Opera Mecatronica has been shown in Hungary, South Africa, Canada, USA, Finland.

Between 2010 and 2015 Carl was a doctoral student at KTH (The royal institute of Technology) in collaboration with the University College of opera in Stockholm, and between 2011 and 2014 he was appointed visiting professor at the same venue, being responsible for development and teaching within the realm of opera and technology. The courses in Extended Opera toured Sweden, Holland (Operdagen Rotterdam), South Africa (Cape Town Opera) and Hungary (Liszt Academy).

Since 2014, he has been visiting professor at the University of Karlstad/ Musikhögskolan Ingesund.

== In popular culture ==
In the book The Nightmare by Lars Kepler, “the composer Carl Unander-Scharin’s erotic duet for violoncello and mezzo-soprano” is mentioned. The musical composition does not exist in reality but the mentioning of it was a way for the authors to thank Carl Unander-Scharin for his musical advice during the writing of the book.

== Sources ==
This article incorporates text from a free content work. Licensed under Creative Commons Attribution 4.0 International License. Text taken from Carl Unander-Scharin, English CV, July 2017, Carl Unander-Scharin, www.electronic-opera.com.
