= Leonard Labatt =

Swedish dramatic tenor

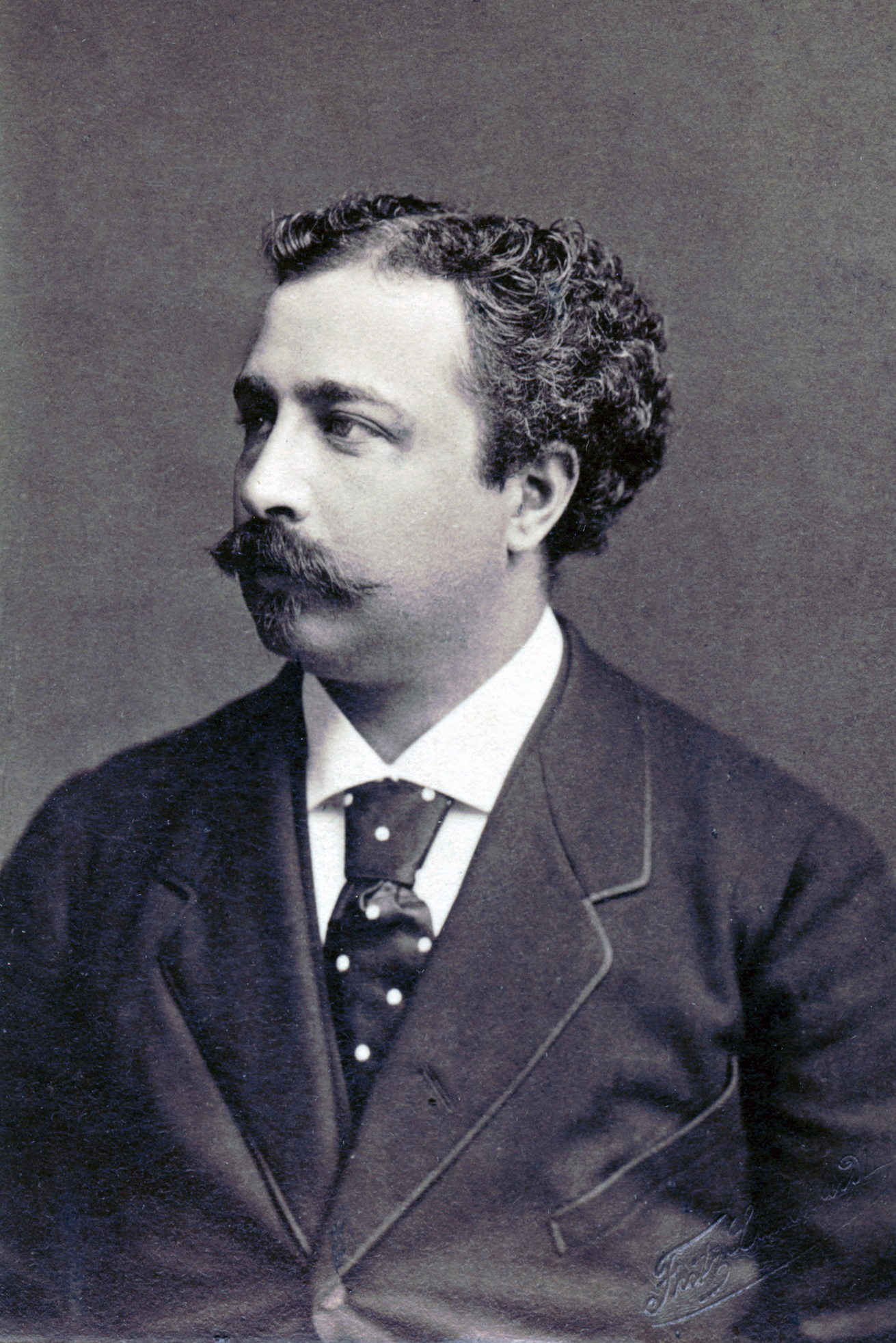
Leonard Labatt

Leonard Labatt (4 December 1838 – 7 March 1897) was a Swedish dramatic tenor.

Labatt was born in a Jewish family in Stockholm and studied under Julius Günther at the Stockholm Conservatory and Jean Jacques Masset at the Conservatoire de Paris. He made his début in 1866 at the Royal Swedish Opera, in Mozart's Die Zauberflöte. During the season of 1868 he was engaged at the Semperoper in Dresden, and in 1869 he joined the Imperial Opera in Vienna, with which he remained until 1883. Between 1884 and 1888 he appeared on several stages in the Netherlands and Germany (Rotterdam, Bremen, etc.). In 1888-1889 he went on tour of the United States and Canada with Alexander Strakosch, returning to his native country afterwards. He died, aged 58, in Christiania, Norway.

Labatt's repertoire included: Vasco da Gama in Meyerbeer's L'Africaine, the title role in Gounod's Faust, Eleazar in Halévy's La Juive, and the title roles in Richard Wagner's Tannhäuser and Rienzi.
