= Elsa Stuart-Bergstrom =

Swedish author, composer and music critic

Elsa Marianne Stuart-Bergstrom (26 April 1889 – 19 May 1970) was a Swedish author, composer, and music critic who wrote several biographies, composed about 60 songs as well as orchestral works, and sometimes published under the pseudonyms Kaimen or E.M.S.

Stuart-Bergstrom was born in Stockholm to Hanna Mariana Hjerpe and Johan Magnus Stuart. Hanna was a housekeeper and seamstress for Stuart; they married in 1906. Stuart-Bergstrom lived with her aunt, Tekla Rydbergi Soderkoping, for much of her childhood. She graduated from the Wallinska Skolan in Stockholm, then studied art and literary history at Stockholm University. She studied music at the Stockholm Conservatory with Lennart Lundberg and Kerstin Stroemberg, and with Felix Saul, a local cantor.

In 1932, Stuart-Bergstrom married Richard Bergstrom, a Swedish Customs clerk, and they moved to Skara, where she lived the rest of her life. She lectured on the radio and worked as a music critic for Stockholm newspapers as well as for the Musical Times (London), sometimes using the pseudonym Kaimen or E.M.S. Stuart-Bergstrom was a member of the Stockholm Foreign Press Association.

Stuart-Bergstrom's papers are archived at the Swedish Music and Theater Library (Musikverket). Her composition manuscripts are stored at the Diocesan and National Libraries of Skara, Her publications include:

== Books ==
- Elfria Andrée
- Kurt Atterberg
- Johann Sebastian Bach
- Anton Bruckner

== Music ==
- about 60 songs
- “Song in folk tone” (voice and piano; text by Bengt E. Nyström)
- “Spelare-Jan” (voice and piano; text by Bengt E. Bystrom)
