= Wästberg =

Wästberg is a surname. Notable people with the surname include:

- Olle Wästberg (1945–2023), Swedish journalist, politician, and diplomat
- Per Wästberg (born 1933), Swedish writer
