= Adolf Wiklund (musician) =

Swedish composer (1879–1950)

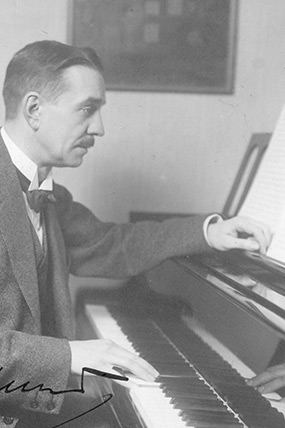

Background information
- Instrument: piano

Adolf Wiklund (5 June 1879 – 2 April 1950) was a Swedish composer and conductor. He was born in Långserud, Värmland, and his father was an organist. After graduating from the Royal College of Music, Stockholm as an organist and music teacher, Wiklund was awarded scholarships to study piano in Sweden and then in Paris. His debut as a piano soloist came in 1902 playing his own Konsertstycke in C major, Op 1.

After 1911 he worked mainly as a conductor. He conducted the Swedish Royal Orchestra from 1911 to 1924, he was director of the Royal Swedish Opera in 1923, and he served as principal conductor of the Stockholm Concert Society until 1938. He died in Stockholm.

Wiklund's compositions are Romantic and nationalistic in style. His later works show the influence of Impressionism. His compositions have had a great impact on Swedish music. His output includes two piano concertos, a symphonic poem Sommarnatt och soluppgång ("Summer night and sunrise"), a symphony, and a violin sonata.
