= Jesper Nordin (Swedish composer) =

Swedish composer

Jesper Nordin (born 6 July 1971 in Stockholm) is a Swedish composer. His music mixes traditional Swedish folk music, rock music, electroacoustics and improvisation. In 2002 his composition Calm Like a Bomb won second prize in Category B: electroacoustic music with voice or instruments in the 24th Russolo Composers Competition, and this piece was released on a CD together with music by the other prizewinners. The following year he was a finalist in Category A: electroacoustic music, of the same competition. He was Composer in Residence at SR P2, Swedish Radio’s serious music channel, from 2004 to 2006. "Residues", released in 2006 by Swedish Radio, has been hailed as a "milestone for contemporary music lovers" in France and as "a central album of the Swedish music from the first decade of the 21st century" in Swedish press. Nordin was given a recommendation at UNESCO's Rostrum 2005 and his music has been played at several ISCM festivals. He received the Saltö Foundation Award in 2014 for his work 'Pendants'.

Performances of his orchestral music have been given throughout the world by such orchestras as the BBC Scottish Symphony Orchestra, the Basel Symphony Orchestra, the Swedish Radio Symphony Orchestra, the Finnish Radio Symphony Orchestra, the Trondheim Symphony Orchestra and others. He music is also performed by important contemporary ensembles, including Ensemble l’Itinerare, Ensemble Orchestral Contemporain, the Dutch ASKO ensemble, the San Francisco Contemporary Music Players, the Finnish Zagros ensemble and many others.

His music is published by Edition Peters, Moeck Verlag, Edition Suecia, Pizzicato Verlag and Swedish Music Information Centre.

== Writings ==
- 2005. "Gränslost forum eller musikfabrik?" Nutida Musik 48, no. 3 ("Frankrike"): 46–55.
- 2008. "Composer-in-residence: Så tycker tonsättarna". Nutida Musik 51, no. 3:44–47.
