= Harald Fryklöf =

Swedish composer and music teacher

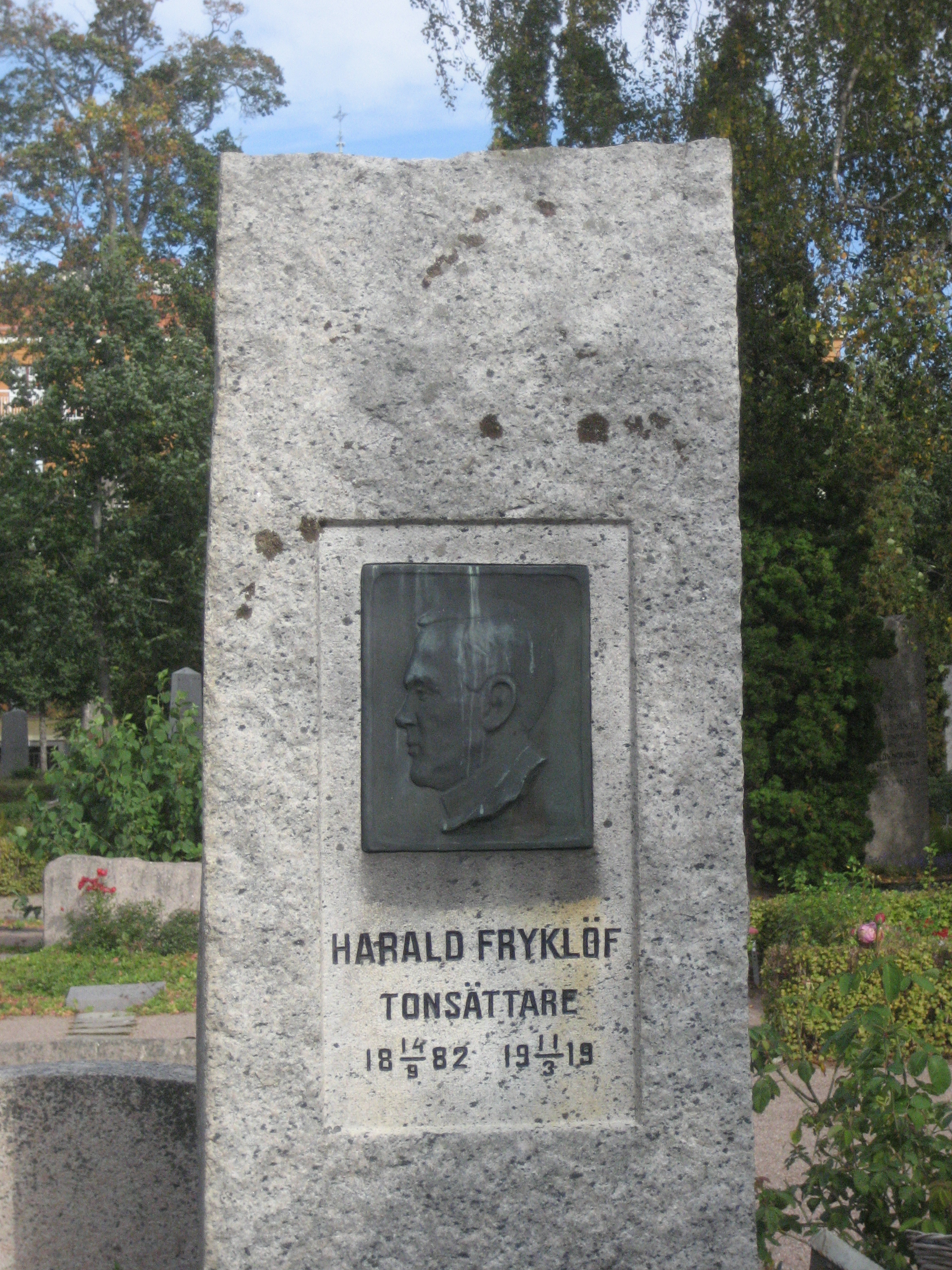
Grave of Harald Fryklöf

Harald Leonard Fryklöf (14 September 1882 – 11 March 1919) was a Swedish composer, music teacher, and member of the Royal Swedish Academy of Music. The music he wrote was in a Late Romantic style. At the time of his early death, he was considered a promising composer in Sweden, appreciated by his colleagues.

== Biography ==
Harald Fryklöf was born in Uppsala. Little is known about his early life. In 1901 he entered the Royal Conservatory of Music, the predecessor of the present-day Royal College of Music, Stockholm. In 1902 he started taking private lessons, in addition to attending the conservatory. In 1905, he spent a term in Berlin, where he studied instrumentation under Philipp Scharwenka. Fryklöf considered this experience to be of great value for his development as a composer. He also took private piano lessons in Sweden from 1904 until 1910, and in general continuously sought to improve his skills and knowledge throughout his short life.

He began teaching harmony and piano in 1904 and would continue to be active as a teacher for all his life, dividing his teaching efforts between private schools and the Royal Conservatory. In 1908 he attained the position of assistant organist at Storkyrkan in Gamla stan in Stockholm, and in 1918 became the head organist of the church. In 1915, he became a member of the Royal Swedish Academy of Music. During the last years of his life he attained several prestigious commissions and positions. Fryklöf was widely regarded as a skillful professional by his Swedish colleagues. He had an international outlook, published several of his pieces abroad and cooperated with foreign composers, for example Peter Griesbacher. Fryklöf, "who had hardly ever known a day’s illness in his life", was infected with the Spanish flu in early March 1919, subsequently caught pneumonia and died on 11 March 1919, aged 36. At the time of his death, he was considered a composer of significant promise in Sweden and has been called one of the most important composers of his generation.

In 2019, to commemorate the centenary of his death, a memorial concert with some of his compositions was performed in Saint James's Church, Stockholm.

== Works ==
Fryklöf worked in the tradition of Late Romanticism, but with a "distinctively personal idiom". He had an interest in the history of music, which often influenced his compositions. He often sought to integrate elements from a wide variety of sources into his compositions. The compositions of Fryklöf have been described as characterised by "modally inspired idiom and a predilection for contrapuntal writing and polyphonic forms." The earliest known compositions by Fryklöf are from 1900, i.e. before he had entered the conservatory. From c. 1905–1910, Fryklöf composed music for organ and choral works; especially the later have been praised. In the years between 1912 and 1915, Fryklöf wrote several motets, and he spent his last years composing sacral music. A Sonata alla leggenda for violin and piano by Fryklöf from the same time is often regarded as his best composition. He only composed a single work for symphony orchestra, Concert Overture op. 1, which was incidentally also his first composition.
