= Tore Uppström =

Swedish pianist, composer and author (1937–2006)

Tore Ingvar Uppström (8 December 1937 in Stockholm – 8 June 2006) was a Swedish pianist, composer and author.

Uppström studied at Royal College of Music, Stockholm, from 1959 to 1963 and at the Vienna Academy of Music from 1963 to 1964. He toured in Sweden and abroad, performed about 300 concerts and participated in radio broadcasts around a hundred times. He worked as a music teacher, was chairman of Svenska tonkonstnärsförbundet ("Swedish association of musical artists"), a union for Swedish freelance musicians, and consultant for Föreningen Musikcentrum (which presents itself in English as "The Music Centre – independent organisation for the promotion of music"), another organisation for freelance musicians.

In 1973, he published the book Pianister i Sverige (Pianists in Sweden, with a summary in English), an overview based on a series of lectures in Swedish radio on the history of piano music in Sweden from the end of the 18th to the middle of the 20th century. Another book, Spelrummet Sverige. En ordbok on 1900-talets artister, trender och motbilder. Om Svenska tonkonstnärsförbundet i tiden ("Playground Sweden. A Dictionary of 20th century artists, trends and anti-images. About Svenska tonkonstnärsförbundet in its time") was published in 1997. Uppström also published a number of articles for musical periodicals.

His contributions as a composer are limited to a handful of piano pieces and some smaller works for different instrumental ensembles. He also made a critical edition of Dag Wirén's 2nd symphony (2000), published by The Swedish Art Music Society.
