= Hans Eklund (composer) =

Swedish composer

Hans Eklund (July 1, 1927 – March 8, 1999) was a Swedish composer and music educator.

== Life and career ==
Eklund was born in Sandviken. As a composer, his music displays a strong influence of Paul Hindemith and Max Reger. His music can sway emotionally and dramatically from plaintive tenderness to violent power and from seriousness to humor. His compositional output includes twelve symphonies among many other orchestral works; the operas Moder svea (1971) and Den fula ankungen (1976); multiple choral works including a Requiem (1978) for chorus, vocal soloists, and orchestra; and many different kinds of chamber music.

From 1947 to 1952 Eklund studied at the Royal College of Music, Stockholm where he was a pupil of Ake Udden and Lars-Erik Larsson. He then pursued graduate studies in composition with Ernst Pepping at the Berliner Hochschule für Musik from 1953 to 1954. He studied opera at the Conservatorio Santa Cecilia in Rome in 1957. He taught music theory at the Royal College of Music, Stockholm for many years; being appointed a professor in 1964.

Eklund was elected a member of the Royal Swedish Academy of Music in 1975, and was the recipient of the Litteris et Artibus from King Carl XVI Gustaf. He died on March 8, 1999, at the age of 71 in Stockholm.
