= Leilei Tian =

Chinese composer

Leilei Tian (田蕾蕾; born 31 July 1971) is a Chinese composer of contemporary classical music. Born in China, she has studied at the Central Conservatory of Music in Beijing (1988–1995), the Conservatory of Music in Gothenburg (1997–2001), and IRCAM in Pari 2002–2003s.

Her compositions have been performed by Tonhalle-Orchester Zürich, Royal Stockholm Philharmonic Orchestra, Ensemble InterContemporain, Gothenburg Symphony Orchestra, Gulbenkian Orchestra, Orchestre philharmonique de Strasbourg, National Orchestra of Radio and Television of Serbia, Hong Kong Philharmonic Orchestra, Beijing Symphony Orchestra, Ensemble Orchestral Contemporain of Lyon, Nieuw Ensemble, Ensemble Integrales of Hambourg, Ensemble Zagros of Helsinki, Nouvel Ensemble Moderne, Ensemble Earplay of San Francisco, and others.

She has been awarded the Prix de Rome, and other awards from the Besançon Composition Competition for orchestra in France, the Contemporary Music Contest "Citta' di Udine" in Italy, Composition Competition of GRAME in Lyon, Gaudeamus Competition in Amsterdam and International Society of Contemporary Music Cash Young Composer's Award.
