= Gustaf Hägg =

Swedish composer (1867–1925)

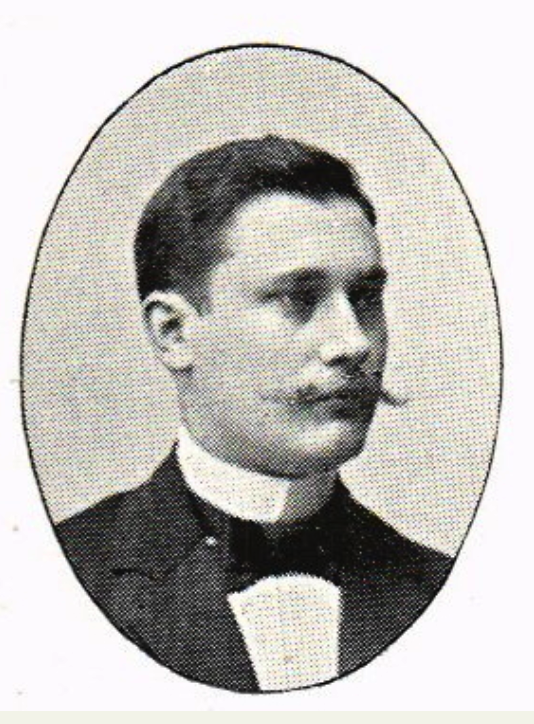
Gustaf Wilhelm Petersson Hägg

Gustaf Wilhelm Petersson Hägg (November 28, 1867 – February 2, 1925) was a Swedish organist and composer.

== Life ==
Hägg was born in Visby, Gotland. He studied at the Royal Swedish College of Music receiving his organist's degree in 1886 and his higher degree (kyrkosångar- och musiklärarexamen) in 1889. He was appointed organist of Klara Church in 1893 and began teaching harmony at the Royal College in 1904. In 1908 he began teaching organ and he was appointed professor of organ in 1915. He died in Stockholm.

His "Legend" for reed organ has been republished by the Reed Organ Society; it is a short, highly chromatic piece of intermediate difficulty, somewhat in the style of Grieg. It begins in six-eight in d-minor, with a folklike theme repeated with variants over sustained chords. The second theme is more-or-less in E-major, but with many accidentals and a highly chromatic accompaniment in the left hand. After the second theme is developed, an abbreviated version of the original theme is restated, and then abruptly shifts from d-minor to D-major, where it is developed, briefly returning to a minor tonality before resolving on a drawn-out D-major chord. The story, one imagines, had a said beginning and a happy ending, but not without a bittersweet sense of something lost forever.

While the piece will work on a standard pipe organ, it sounds much better on a reed organ (either a European harmonium or an American pump organ), as the rise and fall of the air pressure from the player's working the treadles meshes with the music. The constant pressure of a pipe organ makes it sound rather dull, although a skilled player may approximate the effect by a judicious use of the swell pedal.

His works include for instance an overture in G minor (1891), symphony in D (manuscript, 1899), various published organ works, and a piano trio in G minor (1896).
