= Jonatan Sersam =

Swedish composer and pianist

Jonatan Sersam (born 2 June 1986) is a Swedish composer and pianist. His music has been performed by Malmö Symfoniorkester, Helsingborgs Symfoniorkester, ensemble ICTUS, Schallfeld Ensemble, Ensemble Zeitfluss, Ensemble FontanaMix, Norrköpings Symfoniorkester, Swedish Wind Ensemble, Marco Fusi, Ruído Vermelho, Musica Vitae and the Kreutzer Quartet among others. Sersam was awarded Saltöstftelsens Tonsättarstipendium (The Järnåker Prize) 2023 for his piece Presencia de Sombra for bass viol, cello and soprano

== Biography ==
Jonatan Sersam was born 1986 in Lövestad, Skåne län. Jonatan Sersam studied composition with Luca Francesconi at the Malmö Academy of Music.

== Works ==
- Rain Heart Hammer for clarinet quartet, 2024
- l'architettura dell'alveare for harpsichord, 2024
- Kollit - en opera om ett abjekt, opera, 2024. Libretto by Niklas Hansson
- ...jamais assez tôt... for string quartet and mezzo-soprano, 2023. Text by Molière.
- Blue Notes, for alto flute, clarinet and violin, 2023
- Five piano miniatures, for piano, 2023
- Konstruktionen, chamber opera, 2023. Libretto by Niklas Hansson
- Beyond Lust, for string trio, narrator, electronics and video, 2022. Video by Anna-Karin Rasmusson
- Presencia de Sombra, for bass viol, cello and soprano, 2022
- Tinget, chamber opera, 2021. Libretto by Niklas Hansson
- Platform Findings, for saxophone and percussion, 2021
- Beredskapsarbetaren, chamber opera, 2020. Libretto by Niklas Hansson
- Aria, for bassoon, 2020
- Debajo, for double bass, 2020
- Charcoal Oblique, for symphony orchestra, 2019/20
- A questa voce, for bass flute, bass clarinet, cello, violin, guitar and piano, 2020
- Min Egen Lilla Liten, chamber opera, 2019. Libretto by the composer after Ulf Stark.
- passing lodestones, for accordion and clarinet, 2019
- Tabula Scalata, for orchestra, 2018
- Sånger 3, for trumpet and piano, 2018
- Pareidolia, for viola d'amore, 2018
- Gnistor, for symphony orchestra, 2018
- Som en hemlighet, for symphony orchestra, 2017
- SCENEN.HANDLINGEN, for two amplified sopranos & chamber ensemble, 2017. Lyrics by Inger Christensen
- Sånger 2, for cello and piano, 2017
- Phono Junction, for 15 musicians, 2016
- Vindöga, for five bassoons, piano, marimba and double bass, 2016
- Sånger, for bass flute and viola, 2016
- En gång, dansa med mig, for soprano and piano, 2016. Lyrics by Karin Lundin
- Fluttuante, for flute and piano, 2015
- Frön, for flute, clarinet, cello, violin and piano, 2015
- Atavisms, for clarinet, saxophone, piano, percussion and double bass, 2015
- Aporia, for string quartet, 2014
- Gigue, for large orchestra, 2014
- Natura, for orchestra and choir, 2014
- Grosso, for sinfonietta with piano, 2014
- Favola, for wind quintet, 2014
- Circum, audiodrama with processed voices and electronic music, 2013–14
- Antimi, for mixed ensemble, 2013
- Murex, for orchestra, 2013
- The Hoodoo Machine, for cello, percussion and electronics, 2013
- Musica Di Strada, for piano, 2013
- La Clessidra, for sinfonietta, 2013
- Movements 1-7 for accordion, double bass and saxophone, 2013
- Bakom Jorden, for Ocarina quartet, 2012
- Portali, for brass quintet, 2012
- Reminiscenser, for string orchestra, 2012
- Ich fuhle..., for flute, 2 clarinets, trumpet, piano, celesta, male singer and strings, 2012
- Friktion, for piano, clarinet, flute and cello, 2011
- Destinations I, II & III, for string quartet, 2011
- Haust for choir & piano, 2011
- Chamber Symphony, for orchestra, 2010
- Etude for solo violin, 2010
- Infusione, for chamber orchestra, 2010
- Bland Näckrosor, for soprano and piano, 2010. With lyrics by Gunnar Ekelöf
- Scener, for orchestra, 2010
- Draug, for wind orchestra, 2009
