= Karin Rehnqvist =

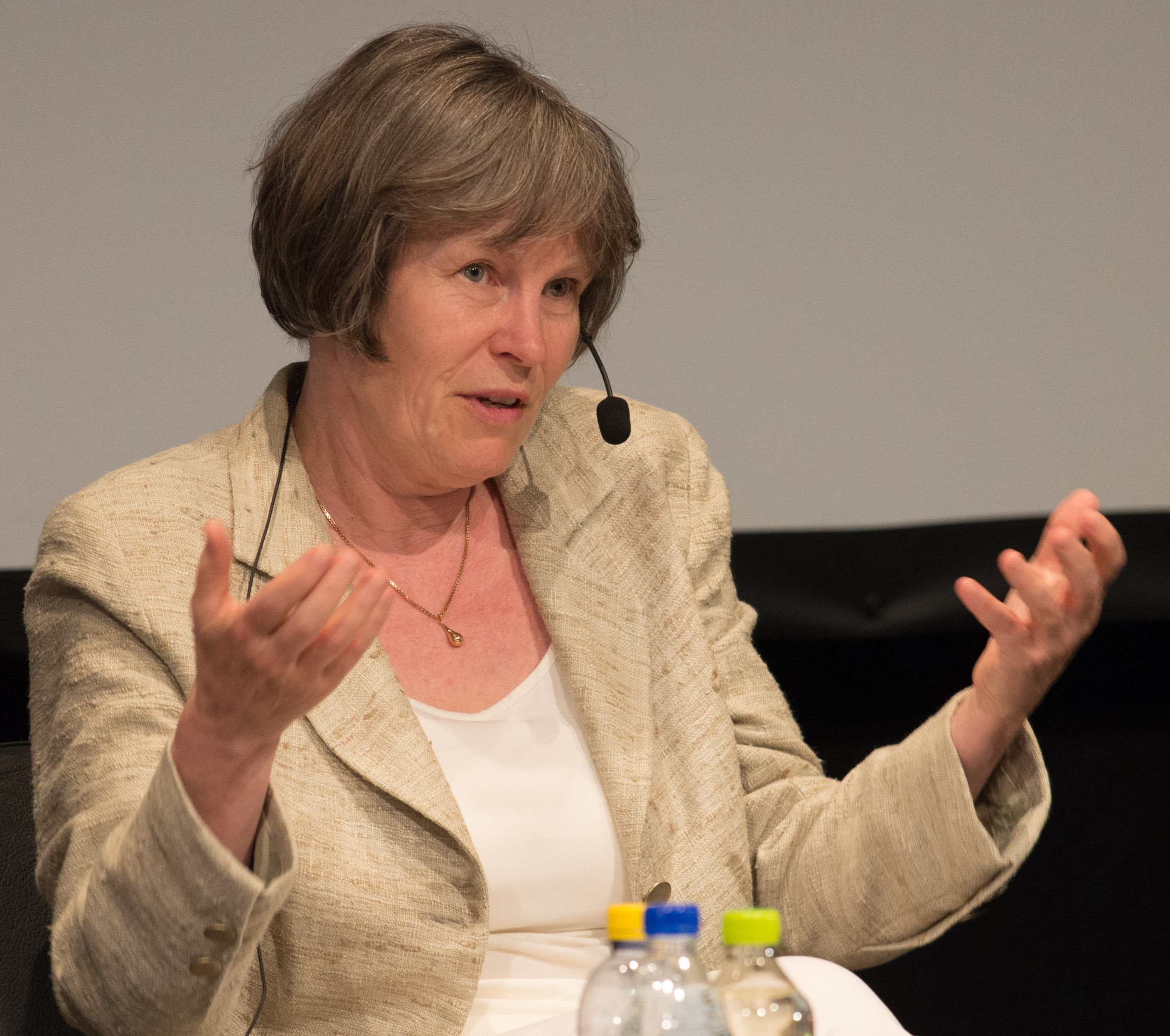
- Gannevik Talks, 2015

Background information
- Born: 21 August 1957 (age 68); Stockholm, Sweden
- Genres: Classical
- Occupations: Composer; Conductor; Professor
- Website: www.karin-rehnqvist.se

Karin Rehnqvist (born 21 August 1957) is a Swedish composer and conductor of classical music. She composes chamber music, orchestral works, music for the stage, and particularly vocal music, incorporating elements of folk music such as the vocal technique of Kulning. In 2009 she was appointed the first female professor of composition at the Royal College of Music in Stockholm.

== Career ==
Rehnqvist was born in Stockholm and grew up in Nybro. She studied music pedagogy at the Royal College of Music in Stockholm from 1976 to 1980, and continued to study composition to 1984, with Gunnar Bucht, Pär Lindgren and Brian Ferneyhough, among others. Between 1976 and 1991 she was the artistic director and conductor of the choir Stans Kör. From 2000 to 2003 she was Composer in Residence with the Scottish Chamber Orchestra and the Svenska Kammarorkestern. For them she composed a series of works including a concerto for clarinettist Martin Fröst, and the symphonic work Arktis Arktis!, inspired by a polar expedition in the summer of 1999. These two works were recorded in May 2005. Her choral symphony Light of Light, which features children's choir and orchestra, was premiered in Paris in 2004.

In 2006, a retrospective of her work was presented by the Royal Stockholm Philharmonic Orchestra, conducted by Niklas Willén. In 2009, Rehnqvist was appointed the first female professor of composition at the Royal College of Music.

== Composition ==
Several of Rehnqvist's works were composed for the voices and interpretation of Lena Willemark and Susanne Rosenberg, both having a past as folk singers, such as Davids nimm and Puksånger-lockrop (1989). Rehnqvist includes kulning (cattle calling) in her works, a high-pitched vocal technique used by Scandinavia shepherds to communicate over long distances, calling livestock down from high mountain and possibly scaring away predators. Puksånger & lockrop (Timpanum Songs – Herding Calls) was her second major vocal composition, set for two singers and percussion, in which kulning "begins the piece and sets the atmosphere for the entire work", followed by a section based on "condescending traditional Finnish proverbs" about women, described as "highly effective satiric attacks on misogyny. This section is followed immediately by a kulning section, which represents a rebellion against the previous ideas".

Rehnqvist composed Solsången (Sun Song) in 1994, scored for chamber orchestra with one female solo singer and two narrators. The text is partly based on the Icelandic Sólarljóð (The Song of the Sun), an Old Norse poem written c. 1200 in the traditional metric style of the Poetic Edda, but with content from Christian visionary poems.

== Awards ==
In 1996 Rehnqvist received the Läkerol Arts Award “for her renewal of the relationship between folk music and art music” and the Spelmannen Prize by the newspaper Expressen. In 1997 she was awarded the Christ Johnson Prize for Solsången (Sun Song). In 2001 she received the Kurt Atterberg Prize and in 2005/06 the Rosenberg Award. In March 2006 Rehnqvist was awarded the honour of a major retrospective by the Royal Stockholm Philharmonic Orchestra. In 2007 Rehnqvist received the Hugo Alfvén Prize. In 2014 she was awarded a Grammis in the category Classic for the CD Live.

In 2022 the Nordic Council Music Prize was awarded to Rehnqvist for the ecological crisis oratorio Silent Earth, (libretto by Kerstin Perski) which received its premiere on January 29, 2022 after postponements in the two previous years. It was performed in the Concertgebouw, Amsterdam by the Dutch Radio Choir and the Dutch Radio Philharmonic Orchestra, conducted by Gijs Leenaars.
