= Royal College of Music, Stockholm =

Institute of higher education in music in Sweden

Coordinates: 59°20′38″N 18°04′52″E

- Kungliga Musikhögskolan i Stockholm (KMH)
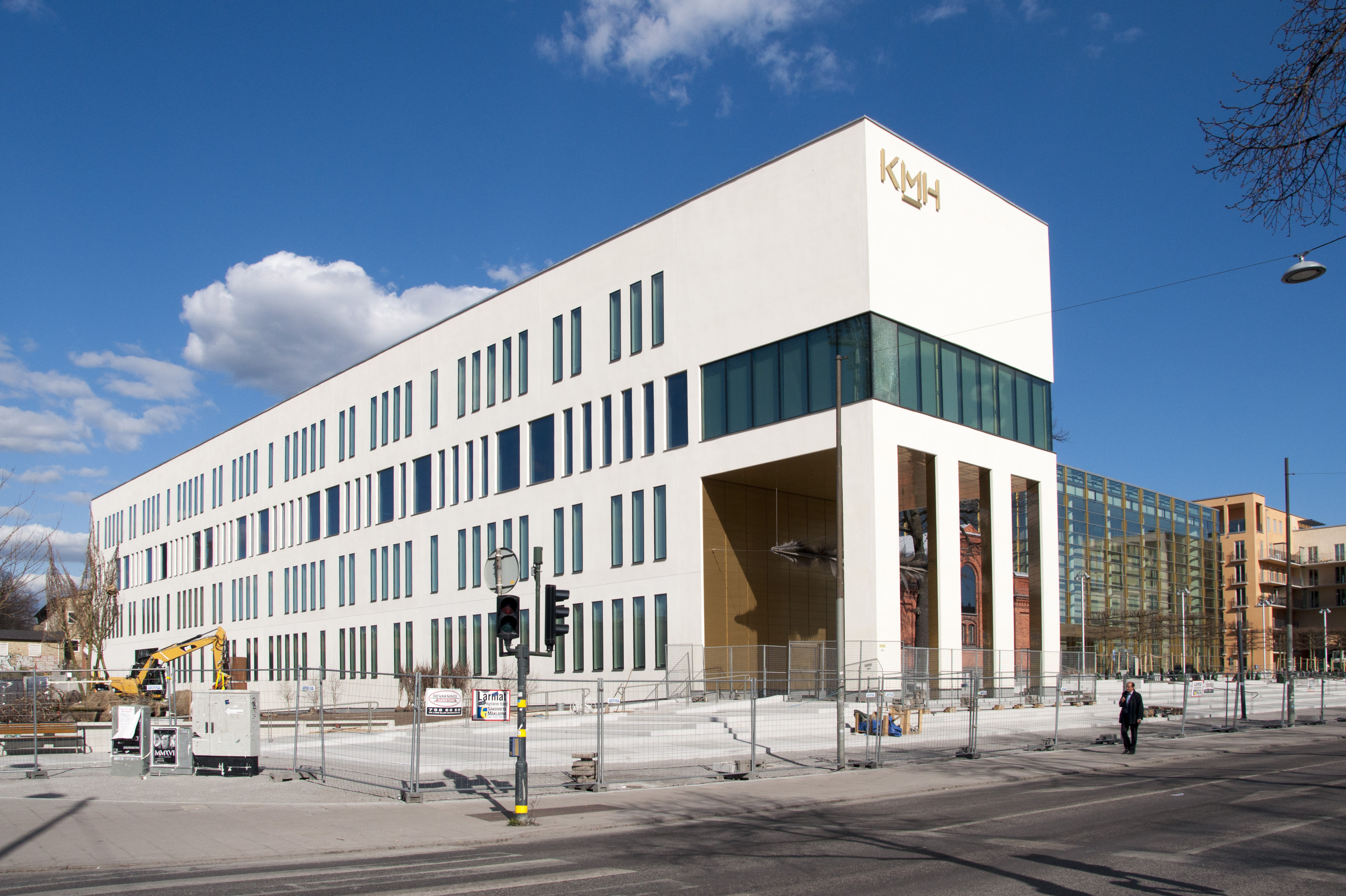
- Main building of the Royal College of Music
- Type: Public
- Established: 1771; 255 years ago
- Location: Stockholm, Sweden
- Website: www.kmh.se/in-english.html

The Royal College of Music, Stockholm (Swedish: Kungliga Musikhögskolan i Stockholm) is the oldest institution of higher education in music in Sweden, founded in 1771, as the conservatory of the Royal Swedish Academy of Music. The institution was made independent of the Academy in 1971, and is now a public authority directly under the Ministry of Education and Research. Vice-chancellor from June 2019 is Helena Wessman, former general manager of Berwaldhallen.

The college educates approximately 1400 students in different disciplines each year, including folk music, jazz, classical music, conducting, composition, music and media production.

4 new concert halls within the campus was designed and built in 2012. These included the main hall (Kungasalen), the smaller chamber-music hall (named after world-famous violinist Nathan Milstein), the ‘Little Hall’ which is adapted for electronically amplified music. The last and fourth hall, called the ‘Black box’ is an experimental space for both acoustic and amplified music. The halls are classrooms for the students, as well as performance spaces for the public to listen.

== Notable alumni ==
=== Composers ===
- Hugo Alfvén
- Anton Jörgen Andersen
- Bror Beckman
- Natanael Berg
- Viking Dahl (also a notable painter and author)
- Hans Eklund
- Gunnar de Frumerie (also a notable pianist)
- Harald Fryklöf
- Ludwig Göransson
- Anders Hillborg
- Jacob Adolf Hägg
- Hannah Holgersson (also a operatic soprano)
- Lars-Erik Larsson
- Ruben Liljefors (also a notable conductor)
- Nils Lindberg (also a notable pianist)
- Pär Lindgren
- Kali Malone
- Edward McGuire (studied with composer Ingvar Lidholm 1971)
- Otto Olsson
- Elza Löthner-Rahmn
- Karin Rehnqvist
- Amanda Röntgen-Maier
- Ákos Rózmann
- Jan Sandström
- Sven-David Sandström
- Carl Unander-Scharin
- Elsa Stuart-Bergstrom
- Tore Uppström (also a notable pianist and author)
- Erland von Koch
- Adolf Wiklund (also a notable conductor)
- Ivar Widner
- Dag Wirén
- Đuro Živković
- Swani Zubayeer

=== Conductors ===
- Herbert Blomstedt
- Ragnar Bohlin
- Sixten Ehrling
- Eric Ericson
- Nils Grevillius
- Veronika Portsmuth
- Patrik Ringborg
- Erik Westberg
- Niklas Willén
- Adolf Wiklund (also a composer)
- Ariel Zuckermann (also a flutist)

=== Instrumentalists ===
- Tor Aulin, violinist
- Carolina Eyck, theremin player
- Fredrik Fors, clarinetist
- Martin Fröst, clarinetist
- Gustaf Hägg, organist and composer
- Andreas Johansson, drummer in Narnia and Royal Hunt
- Anna Lang, harpist
- Ingrid Lang-Fagerström, harpist
- Christian Lindberg, trombone soloist
- Alf Linder, organist
- Henrik Linder, bass player
- Anders Lundegård, saxophonist
- Kali Malone, organist and composer
- Ellen Nisbeth, violist
- Andreas Öberg, jazz guitarist
- Natalya Pasichnyk, pianist
- Mika Pohjola, jazz pianist and composer
- Monica Ramos, harpist
- Markus Sandlund, cellist
- Staffan Scheja, pianist
- Esbjörn Svensson, jazz pianist and founder of the jazz group Esbjörn Svensson Trio

=== Vocalists ===
- Pernilla Andersson, singer and songwriter
- Margareta Bengtson, soprano and founding member of The Real Group
- Jussi Björling, tenor
- Anders Edenroth, tenor and founding member of The Real Group
- Selma Ek, soprano
- Malena Ernman, soprano
- John Forsell, baritone
- Ellen Gulbranson, soprano
- Håkan Hagegård, baritone
- Anders Jalkéus, bass and founding member of The Real Group
- Sofia Karlsson, folk singer
- Leonard Labatt, tenor
- Peter Mattei, baryton
- Kerstin Meyer, mezzo-soprano
- Birgit Nilsson, soprano
- Anne Sofie von Otter, mezzo-soprano
- Susanne Rydén, soprano
- Elisabeth Söderström, soprano
- Kerstin Thorborg, mezzo-soprano
- Lena Willemark, folk singer

=== Others ===
- Rasmus Fleischer, Swedish historian, musician, freelance journalist and debater
- Elsa Stuart-Bergstrom, author and music critic
