= Royal Swedish Academy of Music =

Royal Academy in Sweden

Coordinates: 59°19′50″N 18°04′33″E

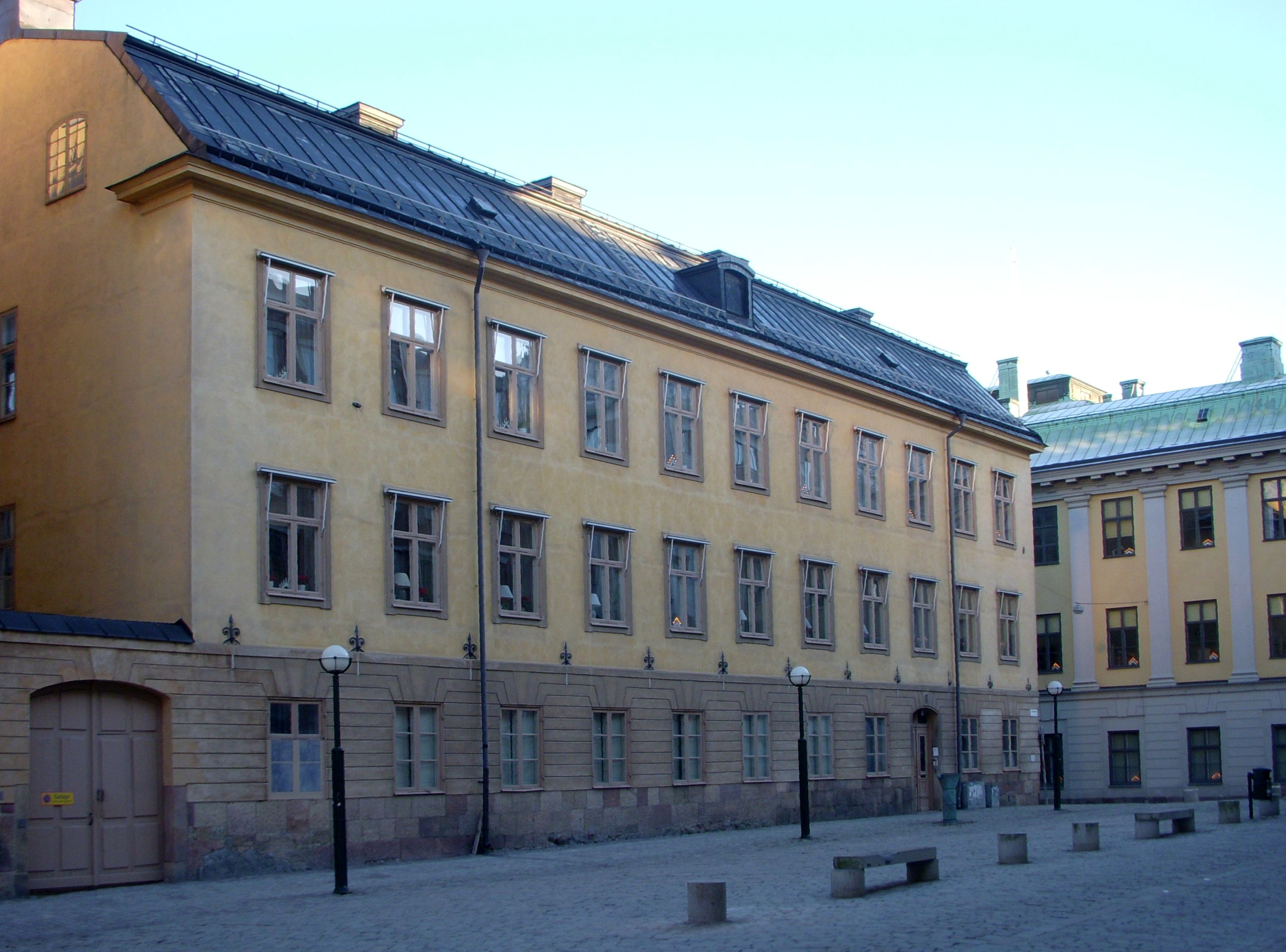
The current building of the Royal Swedish Academy of Music in Stockholm

The Royal Swedish Academy of Music (Swedish: Kungliga Musikaliska Akademien), founded in 1771 by King Gustav III, is one of the Royal Academies in Sweden. At the time of its foundation, only one of its co-founders was a professional musician, Ferdinand Zellbell the Younger. The Academy is an independent organization, which acts to promote the artistic, scientific, educational and cultural development of music. Fredrik Wetterqvist is director of the Academy.

The Academy consists of a maximum of 170 Swedish and foreign members belonging to various spheres of the music industry and has a research committee which has been operational since 1980s. They are involved in research on Gustavian music drama, music archaeology, future developments in musical life and music in a multicultural society. The Academy also publishes various biographies, debate books, analytical writings, etc. and has been offering music students scholarships and various prizes for outstanding contributions in the field.

== See also ==
- Royal College of Music, Stockholm
- Royal Swedish Opera
- Music of Sweden
- List of Swedes in music
