= Bertha May Crawford =

Canadian opera singer

Bertha May Crawford in 1909

Bertha May Crawford (June 20, 1886 – May 26, 1937) was a Canadian opera singer. She built an international reputation as a lyric coloratura soprano in the early 20th century in eastern Europe, performing prima donna roles with opera companies in Russia and Poland between 1914 and 1934. At her death in 1937, music critics considered her the most distinguished soprano produced in that century in Canada. She is remembered as having "a high lyric soprano of great beauty and agility" and was best known for her performances as Rosina in The Barber of Seville, Violetta in La traviata, and Gilda in Rigoletto.

== Early days in Canada ==
Crawford was born in the small rural community of Elmvale, Ontario on June 20, 1886, the second daughter of John Crawford, a tailor of Scottish Presbyterian descent, and Maud Robertson. She grew up singing in trios and quartets with her parents and older sister. The Crawford family moved to Toronto just after the turn of the century where Bertha became a student of Edward W. Schuch, Choirmaster at the Church of the Redeemer (Toronto).

In the early part of the decade, Crawford performed as a solo soprano in local church concerts, benefits and entertainments in Toronto. In 1904, aged 18, she sang at a benefit for the Willard Home for Girls at the Guild Hall and by 1905 she was the lead soprano at the Erskine Presbyterian Church. In 1906 she was appointed to sing at the Sherbourne Street Methodist Church. She sang on the stage of Massey Hall at a fundraiser for the Grace Hospital in 1905 and at a meeting of the Canadian Temperance League in 1906. In 1907 she was the "chief triumph" in a production of Gilbert and Sullivan's The Pirates of Penzance put on by the E.W. Schuch Opera Singers, and in November 1907 she entertained at the annual concert of the Loyal Orange County Lodge of Toronto at Massey Hall. During the summer of 1907 she appeared at the Jamestown Exposition in Norfolk, Virginia, and she toured briefly with a concert party on the lyceum circuit in the southern United States in the spring of 1907.

From 1908 when she was only 21, Crawford achieved the pinnacle of church singing in Canada, signing annual contracts for three years as a soprano soloist with the Metropolitan Methodist Church of Toronto, one of the most prominent Protestant churches in the country. She also performed in other churches, for instance in October 1909 she was one of the 'professional talent' who performed at a concert at the Victoria Presbyterian Church in Toronto.

In the latter part of the decade she began to travel extensively as a performer. During the fall and winter of 1909-10 and 1910–11, Crawford joined the H. Ruthven MacDonald Concert Party for five-month tours of the cities and small towns of western Canada. Crawford sang solos and performed duets with baritone MacDonald, while Mrs. MacDonald accompanied on the piano and an elocutionist provided complementary interludes. The company criss-crossed the Prairie Provinces appearing in halls, churches and theatres in communities from Winnipeg, Manitoba, to places like Lethbridge, Red Deer, Crossfield, Claresholm and Frank, in Alberta.

== European career launched ==
Crawford left Canada in 1911 to pursue studies in London. There she studied under a Czech tenor, Otto Morando, who later became the senior voice teacher at the Canadian Academy of Music in Toronto. She also studied with Olga de Nevosky, and was a featured concert soloist in performances at the Queen's Hall and the Royal Albert Hall. With the support of Signor Morando, she went on to Milan to study with Italian soprano Emilia Corsi.

In May 1913, aged 27, Crawford made her Italian debut in Pagliacci, in Salo, Italy under the stage name of Berta de Giovanni. She also performed as Gilda in Rigoletto in Venice the same year, and toured provincial opera houses across Italy.

In December 1913, Crawford debuted with the Polish National Opera. She sang as a guest performer opposite Riccardo Stracciari, Romano Charini and Dmitri Smirnov. However, her first spell in Poland was interrupted by the First World War and Crawford left Warsaw for Russia ahead of the German advance on the Eastern Front in late 1914. In February 1915 she debuted at the Narodny Dom (People's House) in Petrograd (St. Petersburg) in a performance of Rigoletto opposite baritone Jacob Lukin. She sang in Petrograd through to April 1914, performing in Rossini's Barber of Seville, and in La Traviatta singing in both Italian and Russian and audiences found her voice "rich, melodious and ringing" and her acting "bright and spontaneous". She returned to Warsaw briefly in the summer of 1915 where she sang in La Traviata at the summer theatre in the Saxon Garden, before escaping back to Russia again before the Germans took Warsaw in August 1915. In the fall of 1915, she made guest appearances with the S.I. Zimin Opera Company in Moscow.

During the First World War she represented the Allies in a number of charity concerts including one organized by the Grand Duchess Maria Pavlovna, and she received an award from the Grand Duchess Tatiana at the Winter Palace. In the summer of 1916, she toured with a five-member concert party in the Caucuses, and also performed in Petrograd and traveled south to Odessa where she sang in a concert honoring Nikola Pašić the Premier of Serbia at the Odessa Opera. By March 1917 when the Russian revolution broke out, Crawford had come back west to Helsinki, Finland and she did not return to Petrograd until after the Bolsheviks took power in the fall of 1917. During 1917 she joined a cross-country tour which took her as far east as Vladivostok before returning to Finland. During her time in Russia she sang with such major Russian opera stars as a bass Feodor Chaliapin, tenor Leonid Sobinov, and tenor Dmitri Smirnov.

== Success on Stages Across Poland ==
After the end of the First World War, in late 1918 Crawford returned to Warsaw. She appeared with the Warsaw Philharmonic in a concert in honor of the victorious allies at the end of January 1919 under the baton of Emil Mlynarski. In addition to performing opera in Warsaw, during the 1920s Crawford sang regularly with the Warsaw Philharmonic Orchestra and the Warsaw Symphonic Orchestra under conductors such as Grzegorz Fitelberg and Zdzisław Birnbaum.

She also performed widely in the provinces of what was then Poland. She made occasional appearances in Łódź in March 1919, 1926, and 1928 and at the Lviv Grand Theatre in October 1920. She also appeared with the Kraków Opera in 1920 and the Lublin Music Society in 1924. She was a frequent guest performer at the Poznań Opera in 1921 and 1922, and she sang regularly with the Opera Pomorska in 1926 and 1927, which performed in the municipal theatres of the three cities of Toruń, Bydgoszcz and Grudziądz, in the province of Pomerania. She held recitals in Vilnius in early 1927 and in 1930.

During her career on the opera stage in Europe Crawford specialized in the classic coloratura roles, particularly roles by Verdi, such as Gilda in Rigoletto ('Caro Nome' was one of her favorite recital pieces); Violetta in La Traviata; and Rosina in Rossini's Barber of Seville and Marguerite in Gounod's Faust. She sang opposite prominent Polish tenors and baritones, including international Polish star Adam Didur when he came to Warsaw in June 1924 and in Lodz in April 1928.

== A Trans-Atlantic interlude ==
In 1921, 1922 and 1923, Crawford spent the fall and winter in Canada and returned each summer to Poland. She came home as a star with an international reputation and performed her first recital in Canada in ten years to a sold-out audience at Grant Hall, at Queen's University in Kingston, in October 1921. In Toronto she agreed to a series of concerts at Massey Hall with the Toronto impresario, I.E. Suckling. On November 9, 1921, she sang selections from Rigoletto and Dinorah and reviewers commended her "pure light soprano voice, with an exceptionally good middle register...her florid work was finely finished..." and her "almost perfect intonations...and wonderful breath control and versatility of technique." On January 29, 1922 she sang with the Canadian Grenadier Guards Band at His Majesty's Theatre in Montreal, and in an April recital at Massey Hall she sang numbers by Antonio Lotti and Veracini, and Rimsky-Korsakoff, and "astonished her hearers by the perfection of a long sustained trill proceeding from pianissimo to forte, and the dying away almost to the vanishing point, and then renewed with fresh brilliancy."

After the summer in Warsaw, in October 1922 she took to the stage of Massey Hall in Toronto again to perform arias from Rossini solo and with the backing of the Toronto Festival Choir. In January 1923, she accepted a last-minute invitation to Washington to play Gilda in a production of Rigoletto put on by the rather disorganized Washington National Opera. This was probably her only performance in a full opera in North America.

In July 1923, Crawford was back in Warsaw for the summer, "hypnotizing" audiences with "subtility (sic) beyond expression combined with enormous dynamic". In October 1923, she returned to North America and in November sang in Fort Gary, Manitoba before going to New York for her debut in a recital at the Aeloian Hall, singing pieces from Italian, French and Russian operas, as well as modern French and English pieces.

== European career resumed ==
By June 1924 Crawford had returned to Warsaw to perform in the Barber of Seville and Faust, and she sang with the Philharmonic in December. In 1926, as Poland entered the age of radio, Crawford became one of the early stars of Polska Radio, singing in concerts often in the prime time 20:30 slot through into the 1930s. Her radio concerts were often directed by Józef Ozimiński.

Crawford was an animal lover all her life and always traveled with her dogs. In 1927 she helped to found the Polish League of Friends of Animals. In the early 1930s she spent two summers at the Nesvizh Castle, which belonged to Prince Janusz Radziwill, a Polish aristocrat and politician.

In May 1934 Crawford came home to Canada for the last time, sailing from Gdynia, Poland on the S.S. Pulaski via New York. Her final public performance was at a Promenade Concert at the University of Toronto Varsity Arena in 1935. Crawford died suddenly of pneumonia, on May 26, 1937 in Toronto General Hospital, aged 50.
