= Eurovision Young Musicians 1994 =

International youth classical music competition

Dates and venue
- Semi-final 1: 9 June 1994
- Semi-final 2: 10 June 1994
- Final: 14 June 1994
- Venue: Philharmonic Concert Hall; Warsaw, Poland

Organisation
- Organiser: European Broadcasting Union (EBU)

Production
- Host broadcaster: Telewizja Polska (TVP)
- Executive producer: Małgorzata Jedynak-Pietkiewicz
- Musical director: Kazimierz Kord

Participants
- Number of entries: 24
- Number of finalists: 8
- Debuting countries: Croatia; Estonia; Latvia; Lithuania; Macedonia; Russia; Slovenia
- Returning countries: Greece
- Non-returning countries: Netherlands; Yugoslavia
- Participation map: Finalist countries Countries eliminated in the semi-finals Countries that participated in the past but not in 1994

Vote
- Voting system: Top 3 chosen by professional jury
- Winning musician: United Kingdom; Natalie Clein

Eurovision Young Musicians 1994 was the 7th edition of Eurovision Young Musicians. It consisted of two semi-finals on 9 and 10 June and a final on 14 June 1994, held at the Philharmonic Concert Hall in Warsaw, Poland. It was organised by the European Broadcasting Union (EBU) and host broadcaster Telewizja Polska (TVP). The Warsaw Symphony Orchestra conducted by Kazimierz Kord accompanied all competing performers.

Musicians representing twenty-four countries took part in the competition, with eight of them participating in the televised final. Out of the 24 countries, 16 did not qualify to the final, including the host country Poland. Seven countries made their début, while Greece returned, the Netherlands withdrew, and Yugoslavia being banned from entering the 1994 contest. It is, to date, the contest with the most contestants. It was the first of the Eurovision family of events to feature representatives from Latvia and the Republic of Macedonia, who would make their débuts at the flagship Eurovision Song Contest in 2000 and 1998 (after an attempted début in 1996), respectively.

The winner was cellist Natalie Clein representing the United Kingdom, with pianist Liene Circene representing Latvia placing second, and violinist Malin Broman representing Sweden placing third.

== Location ==
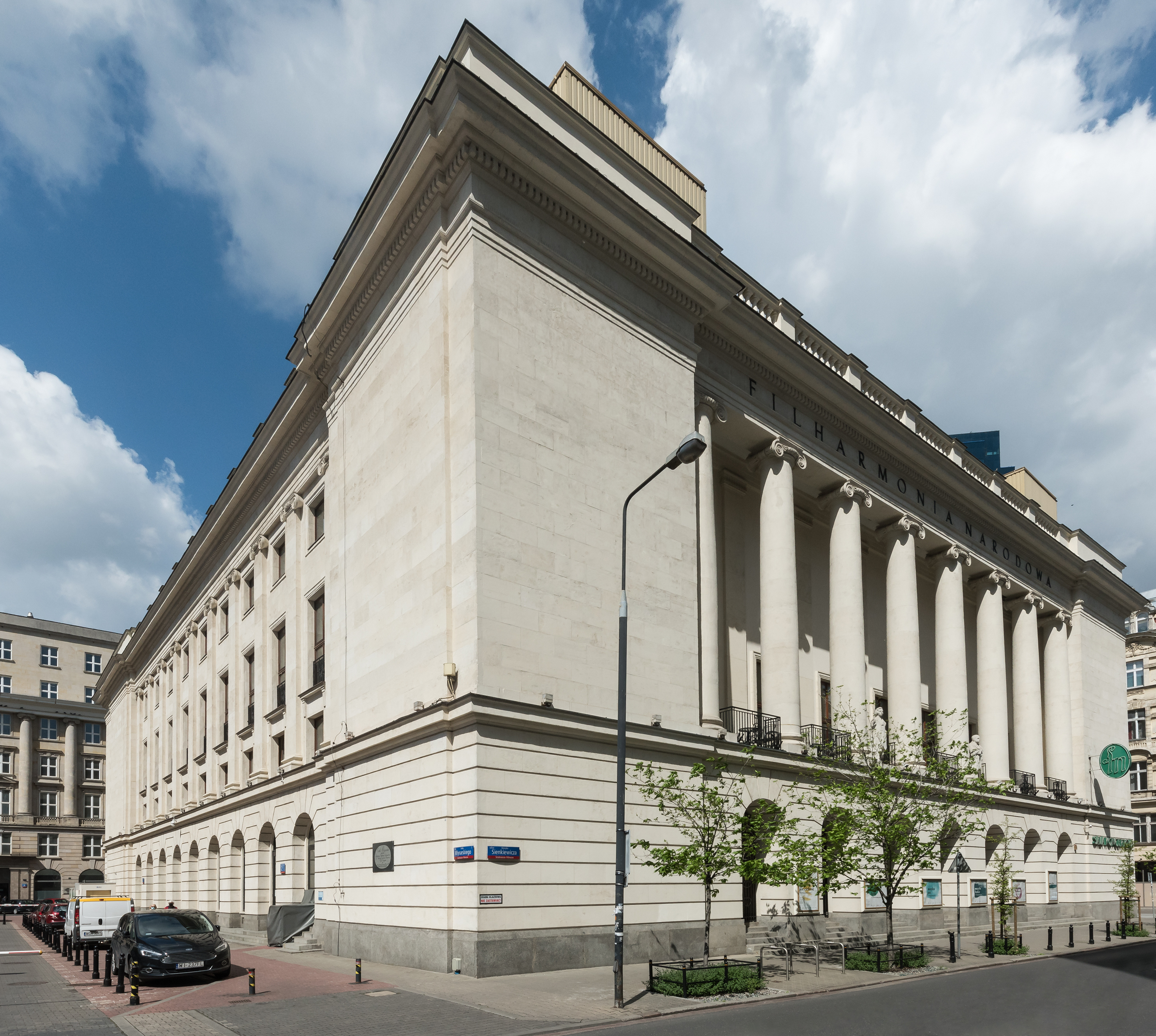
Warsaw Philharmonic Concert Hall. Venue of Eurovision Young Musicians 1994.

Philharmonic Concert Hall in Warsaw, Poland, was the host venue for the 1994 edition of Eurovision Young Musicians. The building was built between 1900 and 1901, under the direction of Karol Kozłowski, to be reconstructed in 1955 by Eugeniusz Szparkowski. The director of the institution is Wojciech Nowak. It is the main venue of the Warsaw National Philharmonic Orchestra.

Since 1955, the institution organises the International Chopin Piano Competition. The building hosts the annual festival Warsaw Autumn.

== Participants and results ==
=== Semi final ===
Broadcasters from twenty-four countries took part in the semi-final of the 1994 contest, of which eight qualified to the televised grand final. The following participants failed to qualify.

Country	Broadcaster	Performer	Instrument	Piece	Composer
Russia	RTR	Anna Ajrapetiants	Piano	Ala Albeniz	Rodion Shchedrin
France	France Télévision	Nicolas Delclaud	Violin	Monologue Capriccio de la Vie d'artista	B. Petrov
Croatia	HRT	Ana Vidović	Guitar	Serenata española	Joaquín Malats
Poland	TVP	Lukasz Szyrner	Cello	Danse du diable vert	Gaspar Cassadó
Austria	ORF	Bernard Hufnagl	Trombone	Sonatine for trombone and piano, Allegro vivance	Kazimierz Serocki
Cyprus	CyBC	Manolis Neophytou	Piano	Prelude and Fugue No.5 in D, Op. 87	Dmitri Shostakovich
Lithuania	LRT	Vilhelmas Čepinskis	Violin	Concerto No.2, part I	Balsis
Slovenia	RTVSLO	Mate Bekavac	Clarinet	Solo de concours, Op. 10	H. Rabasud
Macedonia	MRT	Kalina Mrmevska	Piano	Piano Sonata No. 3, Op.28	Sergei Prokofiev
Ireland	RTÉ	Finghin Collins	Piano	Prelude No. 25 in C-sharp minor, Op.45	Frédéric Chopin
Greece	ERT	Antonios Sousamoglou	Violin	Monogramma for violin solo	Christos Samaras
Spain	TVE	Dolores Rodríguez Paredes	Guitar	Étude No. 11	Heitor Villa-Lobos
Norway	NRK	Rolf-Erik Nystrøm	Saxophone	Suite pour saxophone alto et piano, part I	Paul Bonneau
Germany	ZDF	Luise Wiedemann	Bassoon	Sonate in F-major, Op.168, part II	Camille Saint-Saens
Portugal	RTP	Ruben Da Luz Santos	Trombone	Bach	Kurt Sturzenegger
Belgium	RTBF	David Cohen	Cello	Cantillene-jeu	P.B. Michel

=== Final ===
Awards were given to the top three participants. The table below highlights these using gold, silver, and bronze. The placing results of the remaining participants is unknown and never made public by the European Broadcasting Union.

R/O	Country	Broadcaster	Performer	Instrument	Piece	Composer	Result
1	Hungary	MTV	Mark Farago	Piano	Dance Macabre	Ferenc Liszt	
2	Latvia	LTV	Liene Circene	Piano	Dance Macabre	Ferenc Liszt	2
3	Switzerland	SRG SSR	David Bruchez	Trombone	Ballade for Trombone and Orchestra	Frank Martin	
4	Finland	YLE	Pia Toivio	Cello	Variations on a Rococo Theme, Op. 33, part II, VI, VII	Pyotr Tchaikovsky	
5	Estonia	ERR	Marko Martin	Piano	Piano Concerto No. 1, Op. 35, part III, IV	Dmitri Shostakovich	
6	Sweden	SVT	Malin Broman	Violin	Violin Concerto in A minor, Op.53, part III	Antonin Dvorak	3
7	United Kingdom	BBC	Natalie Clein	Cello	Cello Concerto in E minor, Op. 85, part I	Edward Elgar	1
8	Denmark	DR	Frederik Magle	Organ	Organ Concerto in G minor, part II	Francis Poulenc	

== Jury members ==
The jury members consisted of the following:

- Poland – Henryk Mikolaj Gorecki (president)
- Belgium – Marc Grauwels
- Switzerland – Arié Dzierlatka
- United Kingdom – Emma Johnson
- Czech Republic – Frantisek Maxian
- Finland – Jorma Panula
- Austria – Carole Dawn Reinhart
- Italy – Alfredo Riccardi
- Poland – Wanda Wilkomirska

== Broadcasts ==
EBU members from the following countries broadcast the final round. Known details on the broadcasts in each country, including the specific broadcasting stations and commentators are shown in the tables below.

Broadcasters in participating countries
Country	Broadcaster	Channel(s)	Commentator(s)	Ref(s)
Austria	ORF			
Belgium	RTBF	Sports 21		
Croatia	HRT			
Cyprus	CyBC			
Denmark	DR	DR TV (Note: Delayed broadcast on 14 June at 22:25 CET (21:25 UTC))	Niels Oxenvad	
Estonia	STV	STV1		
Estonia	ETV (Note: The contest was summarised in a half-hour review programme on 5 July at 22:25, with the full recording broadcast in two parts on 7 July at 19:35 and 10 July at 17:15 respectively.)			
Finland	YLE			
France	France Télévision	France 3 (Note: Delayed broadcast in a shortened format; one finalist each week featured as part of the programme Musique Graffiti from 29 March (Sweden) to 24 May 1995 (Switzerland).)		
Germany	ZDF (Note: Delayed broadcast on 14 June at 22:45 CET (21:45 UTC))			
Greece	ERT			
Hungary	MTV			
Ireland	RTÉ	Network 2		
Latvia	LTV	LTV1 (Note: Delayed broadcast on 6 August at 22:30 (EEST))		
Lithuania	LRT	LTV		
Macedonia	MRT			
Norway	NRK			
Portugal	RTP			
Poland	TVP	TVP2		
Russia	RTR			
Slovenia	RTVSLO	SLO 2		
Spain	TVE			
Sweden	SVT	TV2 (Note: Delayed broadcast on 18 June at 21:00 CET (20:00 UTC))	Marianne Söderberg	
Switzerland	SRG SSR	SF DRS		
Switzerland	SRG SSR	TSR Chaîne nationale	Jean-Pierre Pastori	
Switzerland	SRG SSR	S Plus		
Switzerland	SRG SSR	TSI Canale nazionale		
United Kingdom	BBC	BBC2 (Note: Delayed broadcast on 18 June at 14:05 UTC)	Humphrey Burton	

== Official album ==
7th Eurovision Competition For Young Musicians

Compilation album by Eurovision Young Musicians
- Released: 1994
- Recorded: 9–14 June 1994
- Venues: Philharmonic Concert Hall, Warsaw
- Genre: Classical
- Length: 2:34:52

7th Eurovision Competition For Young Musicians was the official compilation album of the 1994 Contest, put together by the European Broadcasting Union and released by the host broadcaster TVP shortly after the contest in June 1994. The album featured live recordings of all 24 participants including those who took part in the semi-final round, divided into 2 separate CDs.

== See also ==
- Eurovision Song Contest 1994
