= Ostrobothnian Chamber Orchestra =

Ensemble based in Kokkola, Finland

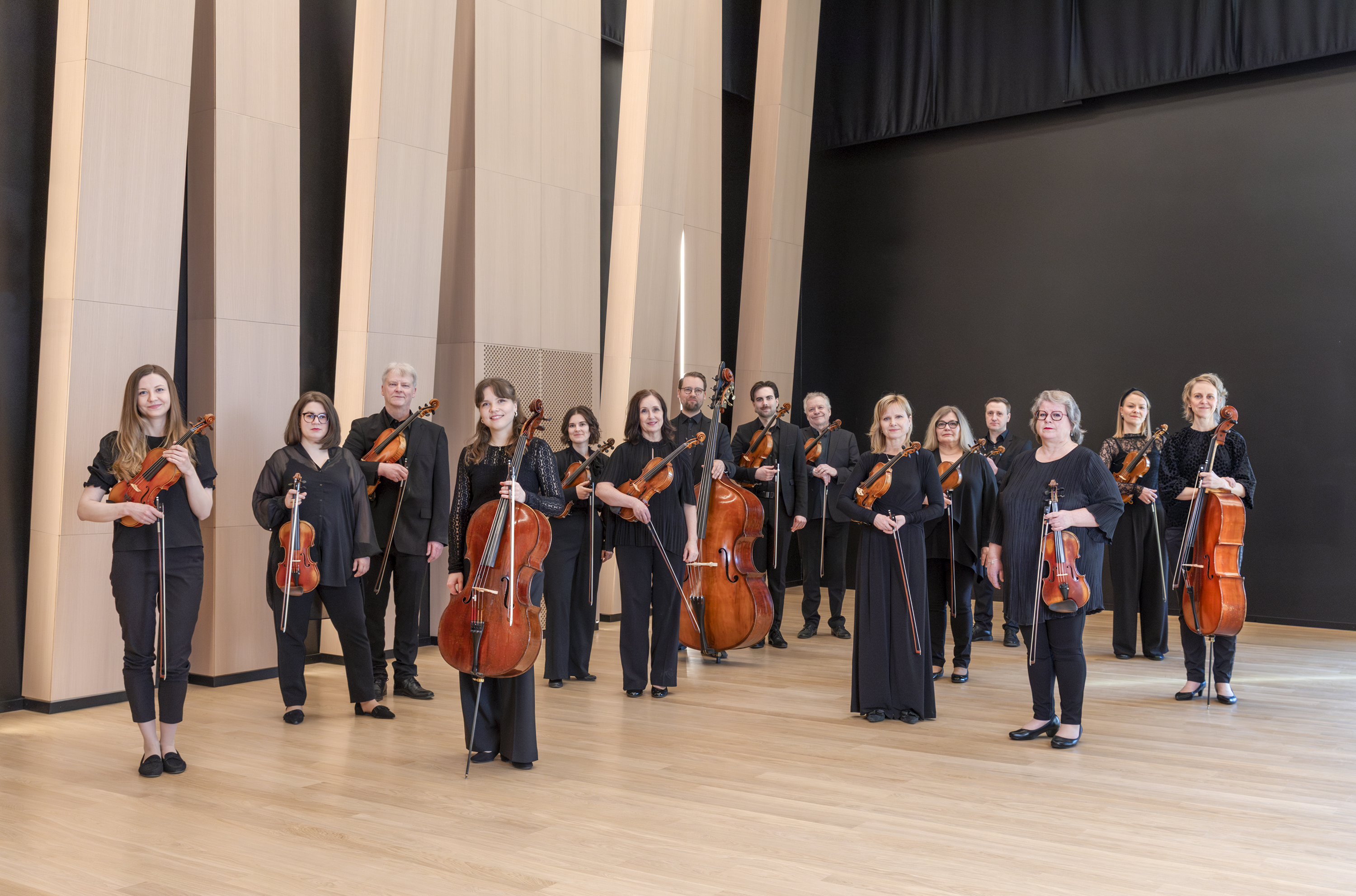
Osthrobothnian Chamber Orchestra

The Ostrobothnian Chamber Orchestra (Finnish: Keski-Pohjanmaan Kamariorkesteri) is a Finnish chamber orchestra based in Kokkola, Western Finland, internationally recognized for its performances of classical and contemporary music. Its primary venue is Snellman Hall, and it performs regularly across Finland and abroad. The orchestra is currently led by Artistic Director Malin Broman, with Kasmir Uusitupa appointed as Artistic Director Designate as of Autumn 2026.

== History ==
The orchestra was founded in 1972 by conductor Juha Kangas, who led the ensemble until 2008 and continues to serve as honorary conductor. Originally established as a student ensemble, the orchestra quickly evolved into a professional chamber orchestra.

In autumn 2013, Sakari Oramo became Artistic Director. Since autumn 2019, the orchestra has been led by Malin Broman, with her tenure continuing through autumn 2024.

== Repertoire and Performances ==
The Ostrobothnian Chamber Orchestra performs a wide repertoire spanning Baroque to contemporary music. The orchestra tours regularly both nationally and internationally, performing in Japan and throughout Europe, including Mozart Festival Würzburg. Conductors have included Sakari Oramo, Klaus Mäkelä, John Storgårds, Jan Söderblom, Daniel Blendluf, and Juha Kangas.

The orchestra regularly performs large-scale projects and soloist collaborations. Notable guest artists have included mezzosopranos Anne Sofie von Otter and Monica Groop, soprano Johanna Rusanen-Kartano, pianist Ralf Gothoni, violinists Elina Vähälä, Lorenza Borrani, Pekka Kuusisto, Otto Antikainen and Tami Pohjola and accordionist Sonja Vertainen, among others.

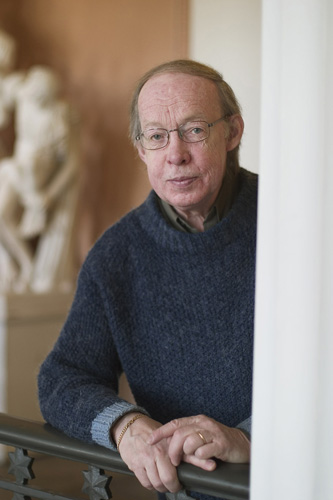
Pehr Henrik Nordgren, long-time composer-in-residence

The orchestra’s active role in promoting contemporary music has yielded over 190 premieres, many of which it has commissioned. The OCO has close relations with both Finnish composers and others in the Nordic and Baltic countries. A defining aspect of the orchestra’s work has been its collaboration with composer Pehr Henrik Nordgren. Between 1973 and his death, Nordgren wrote 22 works for the orchestra, including String Quartets 5–8 for the Kokkola Quartet, formed by orchestra members, and two works for the full ensemble. The orchestra has premiered a total of 30 works by Nordgren.

In autumn 2018, the orchestra began a Beethoven symphony series, culminating in 2020 to mark Kokkola’s 400th anniversary and Beethoven’s 250th birthday. The series concluded with Beethoven’s Ninth Symphony, performed alongside the Tapiola Sinfonietta.

== Awards and Recordings ==
The OCO has made over 80 recordings that have won acclaim and spread its name abroad.

Recent examples are the CD of the Hamburg Symphonies by C.Ph.E. Bach conducted by Sakari Oramo (the Orchestra’s Artistic Director 2013–2019) that won a Finnish classical Emma Award in 2014 and was nominated as Record of the Year by the BBC Music Magazine, and A Finnish Elegy (Alba, 2018), conducted by Juha Kangas and nominated for both an Emma and an International Classical Music Award.

In 2025, it won the Emma Award for Classical Music for its album Finnish Accordion Concertos, featuring three accordion concertos commissioned by the orchestra and premiered at the Kokkola Winter Accordion Festival. This marked the orchestra’s second Emma Award and its fifth nomination, following its previous win of the Janne Prize in 1999. Enjoying a wide international reputation, it has also been awarded such honours as the Nordic Council Music Prize in 1993.

== Tours ==
The orchestra regularly plays concerts abroad, in recent years for example in the Baltic countries, Japan, England, Holland, France, Luxembourg, Poland, Germany, Austria, Scandinavia and New York; in the spring of 2007 the orchestra gave a guest performance at the Konzerthaus Berlin. In summer 2019 it made a return visit to the celebrated Mozart Festival Würzburg in Germany. Outside Europe, it has held concerts in Japan and New York.
