= Cello Concerto (Panufnik) =

1992 composition by Andrzej Panufnik

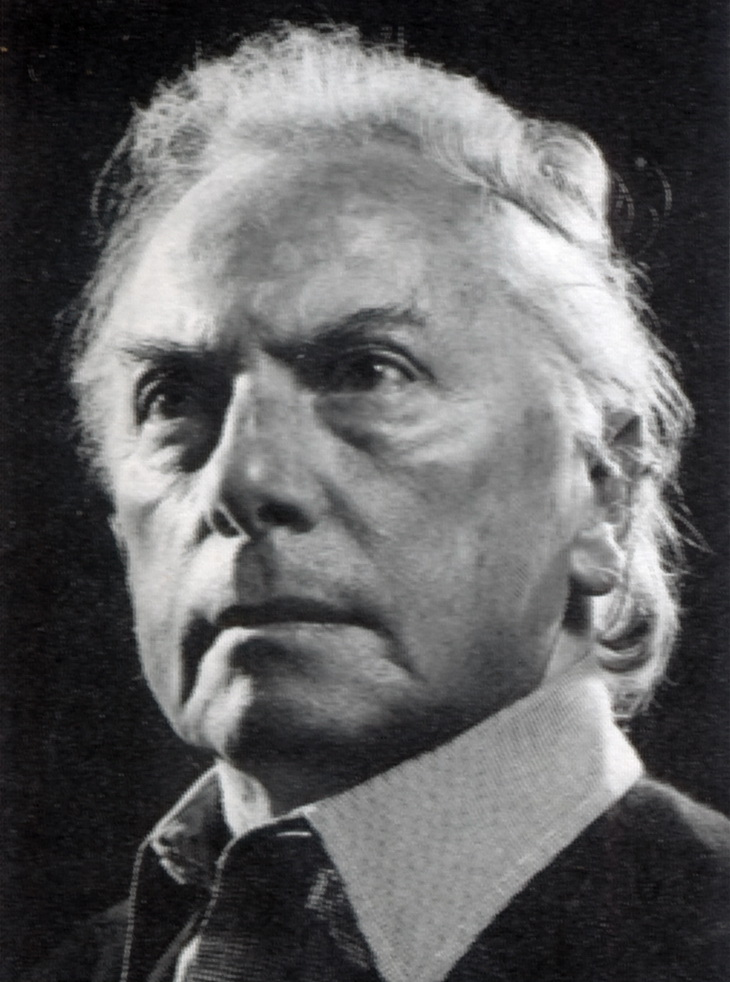
Andrzej Panufnik in the early 1990s

The Cello Concerto is a composition for cello and orchestra by the composer Andrzej Panufnik. The work was commissioned by the London Symphony Orchestra for the cellist Mstislav Rostropovich. Its world premiere was performed by Rostropovich and the London Symphony Orchestra under the baton of Hugh Wolff on 24 June 1992. The concerto was Panufnik's last completed composition, which was finished just two weeks before his death on 27 October 1991.

== Composition ==
=== Background ===
The Cello Concerto was written at the request of the cellist Mstislav Rostropovich, for whom Panufnik had a "deep admiration." The piece marked the composer's third and final commission from the London Symphony Orchestra. Panufnik described some of his inspiration for the work in the score program notes, remarking, "As in my past works, a certain internalised vision of geometric proportions gave me the structure for the whole composition - this time the mandorla, the palindromic almond-shaped figure in the centre of two equal, overlapping circles, which I have often observed woven into the designs of ancient religious art and architecture. I was intrigued by the idea that each movement of the Concerto could be a palindrome within itself as well as a reflection of each other.

=== Structure ===
The Cello Concerto has a performance duration of approximately 18 minutes and is cast in two movements:

1. Adagio
2. Vivace

=== Instrumentation ===
The work is scored for solo cello and a small orchestra consisting of two oboes, two clarinets, horn, one percussionist (on snare drum, tenor drum, and bass drum), and strings.

== Reception ==
Reviewing a recording made from the world premiere, Arnold Whittall of Gramophone wrote, "Panufnik's music never lacks certainty of purpose. There can be a shortage of memorable ideas, but in this concerto strength of feeling, and mastery of form and texture, show him at his most convincing." Reviewing a later recording of the concerto on album with the composer's Piano Concerto (1962) and Violin Concerto (1971), Ivan Moody, also writing for Gramophone, described the piece as "some of Panufriik's most intriguing music." He reflected, "There is darkness also in the Cello Concerto, Panufnik's last composition, written for Rostropovich; indeed, it seems to emerge from the Stygian gloom, only gradually assuming presence, but it is also a work of aspiration, the solo line climbing ever higher, like a tendril searching for the light."
