= Władysław Raczkowski =

Polish conductor and composer

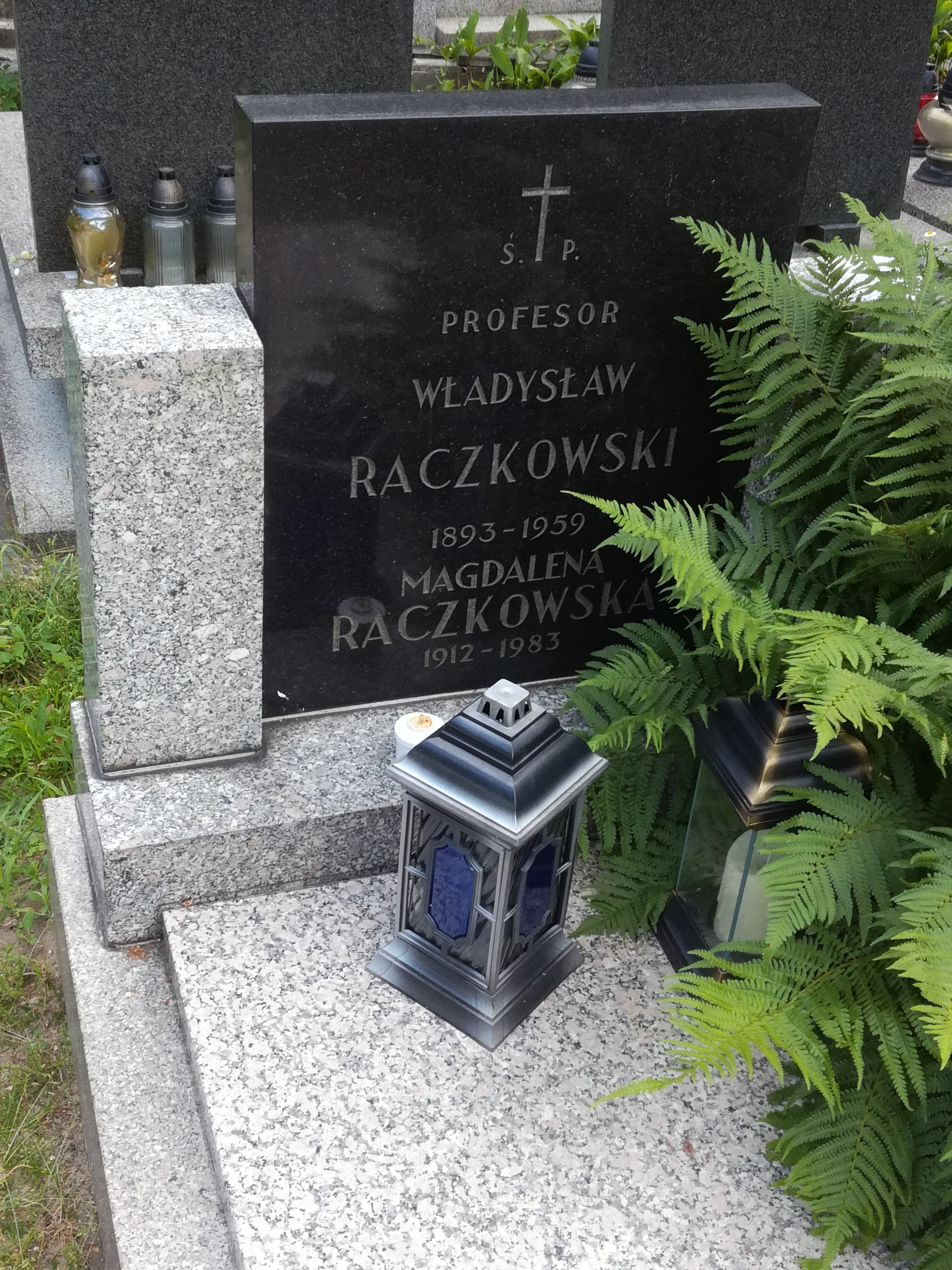
Grave of Władysław Raczkowski at the Old Cemetery in Łódź

Władysław Raczkowski (19 May 1893 in Wartkowice, Congress Poland – 1 July 1959 in Łódź) was a Polish conductor and composer.

Cultural offices
Preceded by Witold Rudziński	Music directors, Warsaw Philharmonic Orchestra; 1949–1950	Succeeded by Witold Rowicki
