= Marko Martin =

Estonian pianist

Marko Martin (born 20 August in Tallinn, 1975) is an Estonian pianist trained at the Guildhall School of Music and Drama, teaching at the Estonian Academy of Music and Theatre. He is a member of the Association of Estonian Professional Musicians and the Eduard Tubin Society.

== Selective Competition Record ==
- 1994 Eurovision Young Musicians - Finalist
- 1998 Gina Bachauer International Piano Competition - 4th prize
- 2000 Honens IPC - 2nd prize

=== Other prizes ===
- 2005 Neeme Järvi Young Musicians Award
