= Sinfonia Sacra (Panufnik) =

Sinfonia Sacra is the third symphony by the Polish composer, Andrzej Panufnik. It was written in 1963 to mark Poland’s millennium of Christianity and Statehood in 1966. Panufnik intended the work as an expression of his religious and patriotic feelings. He based the symphony on the first known hymn in Polish, the Bogurodzica plainchant.

It received its world premiere in Monte Carlo in 1964, performed by the Monte Carlo Opera Orchestra conducted by Louis Fremaux.

== Description ==
The symphony has two parts: "Three Visions" and "Hymn". Both parts are based on the Bogurodzica. This Gregorian plainchant was sung on battlefields by Polish knights and in church as a prayer to the Virgin. The Visions and Hymn thus represent the atmosphere of the battlefield and of prayer respectively. Panufnik believed the elements of battlefield and prayer were the two dominating forces in Poland’s tragic history.

The first part of the symphony comprises three strongly contrasting sections, or "Visions". They are all based on the first three intervals of the Bogurodzica (D-C-F-E). Vision I (Maestoso) is based on the perfect fourth (C-F). It opens with a fanfare played by four trumpets separated at the four compass points of the orchestra. Vision II (Larghetto) is a quiet elegiac section for strings alone, based on the major second (D-C). Vision III (Allegro assai – Agitato) begins with a section for solo percussion and is based on the minor second (F-E). The rest of the orchestra joins in to produce an agitated and dramatic tutti which abruptly ends in silence.

The second part is the "Hymn" (Andante sostenuto – Maestoso). It begins pianissimo with strings’ harmonics. A gradual crescendo builds up until the seven notes of the Bogurodzica are stated in order for the first time in the work. At this point, the four antiphonal trumpets return with the opening fanfare from Vision I. The combination of the heroic trumpets and the religious hymn theme bring the work to a dramatic close.

The symphony lasts around 22 minutes.

== Reception ==
Sinfonia Sacra is one of Panufnik’s most accessible and popular works. It received early critical acclaim in many countries worldwide. The piece has attracted the attention of many respected conductors, including Georg Solti, Hans Schmidt-Isserstedt and Tadaaki Otaka.

Leopold Stokowski gave the US premiere of the work in 1965 with the Rochester Philharmonic Orchestra. The British premiere occurred in London in 1968 with the Bournemouth Symphony Orchestra conducted by Constantin Silvestri.

It did not enjoy critical success in communist Poland. Following its performance in Warsaw in 1978, Polish critics claimed the work was unsubtle. Some used the term "bogoojczyźniana" (God-jingomania) to describe it.

== Recordings ==
EMI recorded Sinfonia Sacra in 1967 with Panufnik conducting the Monte Carlo Opera Orchestra. Elektra Nonesuch released another recording of the work in 1990 with Panufnik directing the Concertgebouw Orchestra (7559-79228-2ZK).

Other recordings include:

- Georg Solti and the Chicago Symphony Orchestra, 1982, CSO From The Archives Vol.14/2 - The Solti Years (p)1999
- John Storgårds and the Tampere Philharmonic Orchestra, 2007, Ondine (ODE 1101-5)
- Łukasz Borowicz and the Konzerthausorchester Berlin, 2011, CPO (777 683-2)
