= Iwonka Bogumiła Szymańska =

Polish composer and musician

- Born: 11 July 1936 (age 90); Warsaw, Poland
- Occupation: Composer
- Instrument: Piano

Iwonka Bogumiła Szymańska (born 11 July 1936) is a Polish composer and pianist who developed a new musical form she called a "sonnet".

Szymańska was born in Warsaw. She debuted as a pianist in 1951 and began composing in 1965, also performing on the radio. She studied piano at the State Music College in Gdańsk and composition at the State Music College in Warsaw, graduating in 1972. Her teachers included K. Jastrzebska and Witold Rudzinski.

Szymańka’s compositions Two Essays (1971) and Trylogia (1973) received prizes. Her compositions include:

== Chamber ==
- Dwoj Eseje (harp)
- Dyptyk (brass band)
- First String Quartet
- Fourth String Quartet
- Freski Kameraine (horn, clarinet, harp)
- Second String Quartet (with flute)
- Third String Quartet
- Tryptyk (brass band)

== Orchestra ==
- First Sonnet
- Mahoniowy Koncert (violin and orchestra)
- Mobil
- Play of Colors
- Second Play of Colors
- Third Sonnet (two pianos and orchestra)
- Trylogia
- Wiosenny Koncert (piano and orchestra)

== Piano ==
- Arabeski (two pianos)
- Esej (piano and percussion)
- Trzy Sonety

== Voice ==
- Second Sonnet (two sopranos, choir and orchestra)
