= Piano Trio No.1 (Andrzej Panufnik) =

Piano Trio by Andrzej Panufnik

Piano Trio
- No. 1
- by Andrzej Panufnik
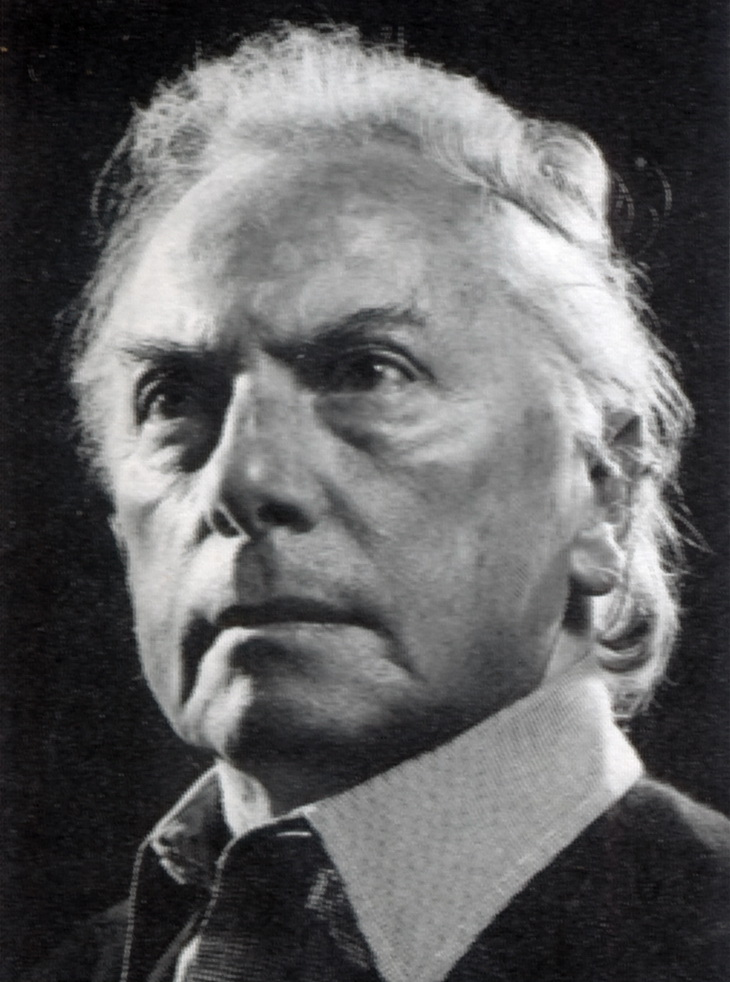
- Andrzej Panufnik
- Key: F minor
- Opus: 1
- Composed: 1934
- Performed: 1936
- Duration: 15–20 minutes
- Movements: 3
- Scoring: Violin, cello, piano

Piano Trio No. 1 is a chamber music composition by Polish composer Andrzej Panufnik written for violin, cello and piano. It is his first work and the only surviving pre-war composition. Panufnik's Piano Trio No.1 is a reconstructed composition originally written in 1934, when Panufnik was 19–20 years old, and later reconstructed in 1945. Including this trio, all of Panufnik's works written before 1944 were burnt down in the Warsaw Uprising. He later decided to reconstruct three of his works from memory. His Piano Trio is one of these compositions (the other two are: Tragic Overture for orchestra and Five Polish Peasant Songs for unison soprano voices and woodwinds).

== Structure ==
Panufnik's Piano Trio is based on the classical model, consisting of three movements. Movement 1 starting with a slow introduction followed by a sonata allegro (Poco adagio – Allegro – Poco adagio), movement 2 as a song-like, beautifully lyrical piece (Largo) and movement 3, a dance like, joyful scherzo (Presto)
