= Olgierd Straszyński =

Polish conductor (1903–1971)

- Born: 29 November 1903; Mariupol, Russian Empire
- Died: 12 January 1971 (aged 67); Warsaw, Poland
- Resting place: Powązki Cemetery, Warsaw
- Known for: Music

Olgierd Straszyński (29 November 1903 – 12 January 1971) was a Polish conductor, member of Polish resistance in World War II and music director of the Warsaw National Philharmonic Orchestra in 1945–1946.

== Childhood and education ==
His father was Stanisław Straszyński, an engineer and director of railroad construction, and his mother was Aniela Straszyńska. His grandfather was Polish opera singer Witold Aleksandrowicz. He began his musical education, as a violinist, in Kyiv. In 1921, he moved with his family to Warsaw, where he graduated from high school in 1923. In 1930, he graduated as a conductor under Grzegorz Fitelberg.

== Career ==
He debuted as a conductor in 1930 at the Warsaw National Philharmonic Orchestra, and from 1932, he worked at Polskie Radio.

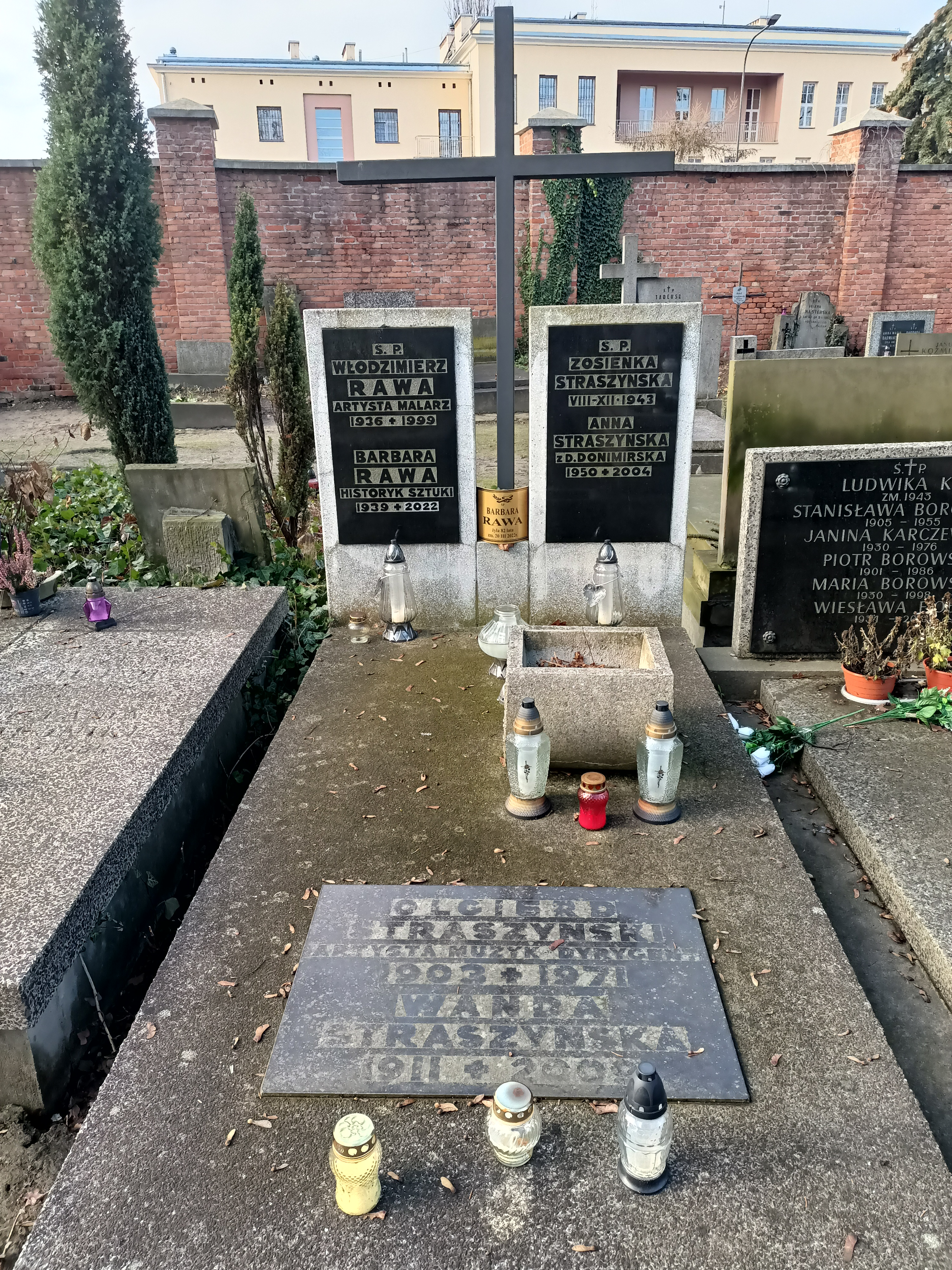
Straszyński's grave at the Powązki Cemetery in Warsaw

During the German occupation of Poland in World War II, he joined the Polish resistance movement. He participated in hiding of Polish cultural property, including manuscripts of Fryderyk Chopin and Stanisław Moniuszko, from the Germans, conducted secret symphonic concerts, published Polish patriotic songs, and during the Warsaw Uprising, he was the music director of the underground Błyskawica radiostation. After the fall of the uprising he was deported by the Germans to forced labour in Essen, however, he eventually escaped and returned to Poland.

In 1945–1946, he was the first post-war music director of the Warsaw National Philharmonic Orchestra. In 1949 he became a conductor of an orchestra in Bydgoszcz, in 1954–1956, he was a conductor of the Philharmonic in Lublin, and in 1957–1960, as artistic director, he developed the Philharmonic in Olsztyn.

== Personal life ==
His son is Andrzej Straszyński, conductor of the Grand Theatre in Warsaw.

Cultural offices
Preceded by Józef Ozimiński	Music directors, Warsaw Philharmonic Orchestra; 1945–1946	Succeeded by Andrzej Panufnik
