= Jesper Svedberg (musician) =

Swedish cellist (born 1974)

- Born: 1974 (age 51–52); Sweden
- Genre: chamber musician
- Occupation: cellist
- Instrument: 1699 Grancino cello
- Member of: Principal Cellist of the Bournemouth Symphony Orchestra

Jesper Svedberg (born 1974) is a Swedish cellist. He is the Principal Cellist of the Bournemouth Symphony Orchestra and a member of the Kungsbacka Piano Trio. He was born and raised in Borås.

Svedberg studied at the Edsberg Institute of Music with Frans Helmerson from 1993, completing his postgraduate solo diploma in 1998. The following year, Jesper continued his studies at London's Guildhall School of Music and Drama with Louise Hopkins, and graduated in 2001 with a master's degree in chamber music.

Svedberg performs mainly as a chamber musician, in various temporary ensembles and as a permanent member of the Kungsbacka Piano Trio. They were formed in 1997 and won the Kungliga Musikaliska Akademiens Interpretpris in 2008.

He also teaches at the School of Music and Drama at the University of Gothenburg and the Guildhall School of Music and Drama in London.

In 1994, Svedberg received Borås Tidning's cultural scholarship.

In 1998, he made his debut as a soloist with the Swedish Radio Symphony Orchestra.

Svedberg plays a 1699 Grancino cello, loaned by the Järnåker Foundation.
