= Witold Rudziński =

Polish composer, conductor, and author (1913–2004)

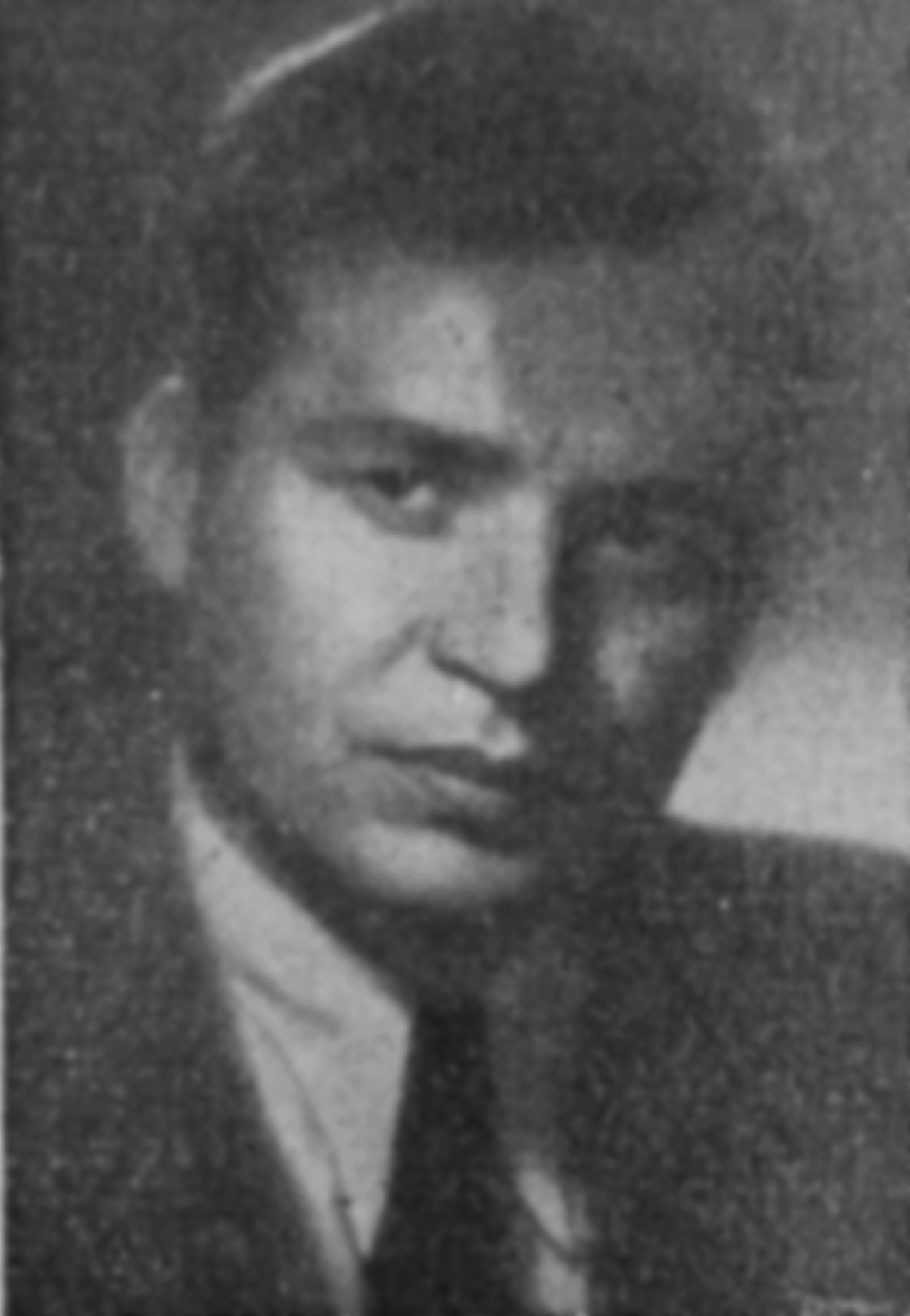
Witold Rudziński before 1952

Witold Rudziński (14 March 1913, in Sebezh, Russian Empire – 29 February 2004) was a Polish composer, conductor, and author.

He studied composition at the Mieczysław Karlowicz Conservatory of Music in Vilnius, and later at the Gregorian Institute in Paris. His teachers included Tadeusz Szeligowski, Stanisław Szpinalski, Nadia Boulanger, and Charles Koechlin.

In addition to composing, Rudziński taught at the Vilnius Conservatory of Music and in Poland at the Conservatory of Music in Lodz and the F. Chopin Academy of Music in Warsaw. Composer Iwonka Bogumila Szymanska was one of his students.

Cultural offices
Preceded by Jan Maklakiewicz	Music directors, Warsaw Philharmonic Orchestra; 1948–1949	Succeeded by Władysław Raczkowski
