= Roman Chojnacki =

Polish conductor

Roman Chojnacki (1 August 1875 [1879?], Łódź – 22 December 1938, Warsaw) was a Polish conductor.

Cultural offices
Preceded by Zdzisław Birnbaum	Music directors, Warsaw Philharmonic Orchestra; 1918–1938	Succeeded by Józef Ozimiński
