= Lorenza Borrani =

Italian violinist

"While having a formidable technique, she is not a virtuoso phenomenon, but something different that has to do intimately with music."

Lorenza Borrani (born 1983 in Florence) is an Italian violinist. She performs as leader, ensemble director, soloist and chamber musician all over the world. To the concert activity she adds that of professor of violin and chamber orchestras.

== Early life ==
"I was five, I didn't have any idea what lungs are"

Lorenza originally wanted to play the trumpet as she had just seen the elephant trumpeters in the Walt Disney movie "Robin Hood". The music school didn't approve of her wanting to play the trumpet as she was too young and her lungs were not big enough. They started her off on the violin instead.

== Education ==
"I met Lorenza Borrani when she was 9 years old at the Music School of Fiesole. [...] She was a sweet and enthusiastic child, together with her mother we went to see the concert Itzhak Perlman held at the Teatro della Pergola in Florence, it was the early 90s. Great Perlman and great Lorenza, who over the years has been able to conquer the public and critics with her wonderful qualities of interpreter"

Loreanza Borrani thinks it is very important to mention the education of a musician and she feels very faithful to the teachers of her youth.

It was a Dutch lady, a neighbor, who noticed her curiosity about music. She began taking violin lessons, around age five, at the Scuola di Musica di Fiesole, studying with Piero Farulli, Alina Company; Pavel Vernikov, Zinaida Gilels and Ilya Grubert.

In her concert debut in 1995 at the theatre "La Pergola" in Florence, she performed Bach’s Concerto for 2 Violins with Pavel Vernikov and the direction of Emmanuel Krivine, in the presence of the at that time Italian Republic President Oscar Luigi Scalfaro.

She graduated at Florence Conservatory of music "Luigi Cherubini", undertook postgraduate studies at the University of Music and Performing Arts Graz, Austria, with Boris Kuschnir and participated in masterclasses with Pier Narciso Masi, Mstislav Rostropovich, Ana Chumachenko, Maya Glezarova and Maurizio Pollini.

Often, in her interviews, Lorenza Borrani recalled the importance that some conductors, with whom she worked, have had in her musical growth. Among them, especially Lorin Maazel, Claudio Abbado and Nikolaus Harnoncourt.

== Career ==
"Maybe the moment I like most about my role as a musician is rehearsal. The moment in which something is built, more than the moment in which the product is presented. The moment of the 'work in progress' is really very special for me"

Since 2008 Lorenza Borrani has been Leader (concertmaster) of the Chamber Orchestra of Europe, with which she performed, among others, under the direction of Nikolaus Harnoncourt, Bernard Haitink, Vladimir Ashkenazy, Yannick Nézet-Séguin, Antonio Pappano, Andras Schiff, Simon Rattle and Herbert Blomstedt.

In 2003 she became leader of Symphonica Toscanini, directed by Lorin Maazel.

She was a member of Orchestra Mozart from 2005 to 2008, with whom she performed Mozart's Violin Concerto No. 7 under Claudio Abbado in 2006. A nice episode of her experience with the Orchestra Mozart was the waltz danced with Roberto Benigni during the performance of Peter and the Wolf conducted by Claudio Abbado, in Bologna (2008).

She also played in the Lucerne Symphony Orchestra under Claudio Abbado and in 2018 and 2019 she played again as leader of the Orchestra Mozart directed by Bernard Haitink.

She has performed as a guest-leader or directed ensembles such as the European Union Youth Orchestra, Mahler Chamber Orchestra, Filarmonica della Scala, Bayerischen Rundfunk Orchester, Freiburger Barockorchester, Det Norske Kammerorkester (Artist-in-Residence, 2020), Orchestre Philharmonique de Radio France, Ostrobothnian Chamber Orchestra, Vallès Symphony Orchestra, Orquesta Sinfónica de Tenerife and Australian Chamber Orchestra.

With the Australian Chamber Orchestra she premiered her own orchestral arrangement of Prokofiev’s Violin Sonata No.1, on tour across Australia in spring 2019.

As chamber musician, Lorenza Borrani has collaborated with Isabelle Faust, Daniel Hope, András Schiff, Pierre-Laurent Aimard, Janine Jansen, Irina Fiodorovna Schnittke, Christian Tetzlaff, Kristian Bezuidenhout, Alexander Lonquich, Mario Brunello and others.

As concertmaster of the Chamber Orchestra of Europe, Lorenza Borrani appears in the season 2020-2021 of the Philharmonie Berlin in a concert with the pianist Yuja Wang.

Highlights of the years 2020, 2021 and 2022 include a return to the Orchestre Philharmonique de Radio France and the debuts with the Camerata Bern, the Swedish Chamber Orchestra and the Västerås Sinfonietta.

In spring 2024 Lorenza Borrani debuted, as guest-leader and director, with the Orchestre de Paris and the Scottish Chamber Orchestra.

She was a member of the Honorary Committee of the project "Farulli 100" dedicated in 2020 to the memory of Piero Farulli (viola of the legendary Quartetto Italiano and founder of the Scuola di Musica di Fiesole) on the centenary of his birth.

In summer 2024, Lorenza Borrani was part of the jury of the 13th International Competition for String Quartet “Premio Paolo Borciani” (June 2024, Reggio Emilia, Italy), one of the most important competition in the world of classical music, promoted and organized by the Fondazione I Teatri di Reggio Emilia.

== Spira Mirabilis ==
"We want to do, together, the work that the conductor does before going to rehearse with the orchestra"

In 2007 Lorenza Borrani was one of the co-founder of Spira Mirabilis, a musical laboratory "to continue to study, to meet, to learn and to rehearse together, and then to share music with an audience". Thanks to this project and to the meeting with italian clarinetist Lorenzo Coppola, Lorenza Borrani developed curiosity and passion for the execution of the classical repertoire on period instruments. Spira Mirabilis was appointed Cultural Ambassadors for the European Union in March 2012, is still a living project today and has enjoyed great success all over in Europe, with appearances including Beethovenfest Bonn, Musikfest Bremen, London’s Southbank Centre, Essen’s Philharmonie, and Paris’ Cité de la Musique and Salle Pleyel.

Spira Mirabilis is based in the Emilian municipality of Formigine, where it rehearses and performs several concerts a year.

== Spunicunifait Quintet ==
"Looking for a name, for the group, it was very difficult ..."

In 2018 Lorenza Borrani debuted the ‘Mozart Quintets’ project at Schloss Elmau, a collaboration with her close chamber music partners dedicated to the study and period performance of Mozart’s rarely performed string quintets. In 2019 the quintet played the complete Mozart's string and wind quintets for the Amici della Musica (Friends of Music) of Florence at the theatre "La Pergola". In 2020 the quintet was named Spunicunifait and in February 2023, it performed the complete Mozart's string quintets in Salzburg at the Mozartwoche (Mozart Week) 2023 (the Salzburg's festival for classical music, around the time of Wolfgang Amadeus Mozart's birthday, organized by the International Mozarteum Foundation).

In 2025, Alpha Classic (Outhere) published a set of the five Mozart string quintets, played on "historical instruments" by Spunicunifait.

== Teaching ==
"She’s a unique and dynamic musical force. Students feel a deep appreciation for how she instils, in each player, truly ambitious expectations of creative collaboration"

Teaching is a central part of the life of Lorenza Borrani.

In addition to performing and conducting, Lorenza Borrani is a Professor of Violin at the Scuola di Musica di Fiesole and in May 2020 she has been appointed to the role of Visiting Professor of Chamber Orchestras by the Royal Academy of Music in London.

From spring 2026 she teaches chamber music at the ZHdK Zurich University of the Arts in Zurich, the largest arts university in Switzerland and one of the largest in Europe.

In 2022 she has also been among the teachers of the Stauffer Center for Strings in Cremona, in the course "Concertmaster Artist Diploma".

== Violin ==
For many years Lorenza Borrani has played precious violins courteously provided by the “Pro Canale” Foundation of Milan, such as the violins Ferdinando Gagliano (Naples, 1762) and Santo Serafino (Venice, 1745). Since 2019 she has owned and played a violin Camillo Camilli, one of the finest 18th-century makers of the Mantua school, which earlier belonged to the German violinist Hubert Buchberger, former member of the Buchberger Quartet and father of her dear friend Luise Buchberger, cellist in the Chamber Orchestra of Europe.
