= Andrzej Panufnik =

Polish composer and conductor (1914–1991)

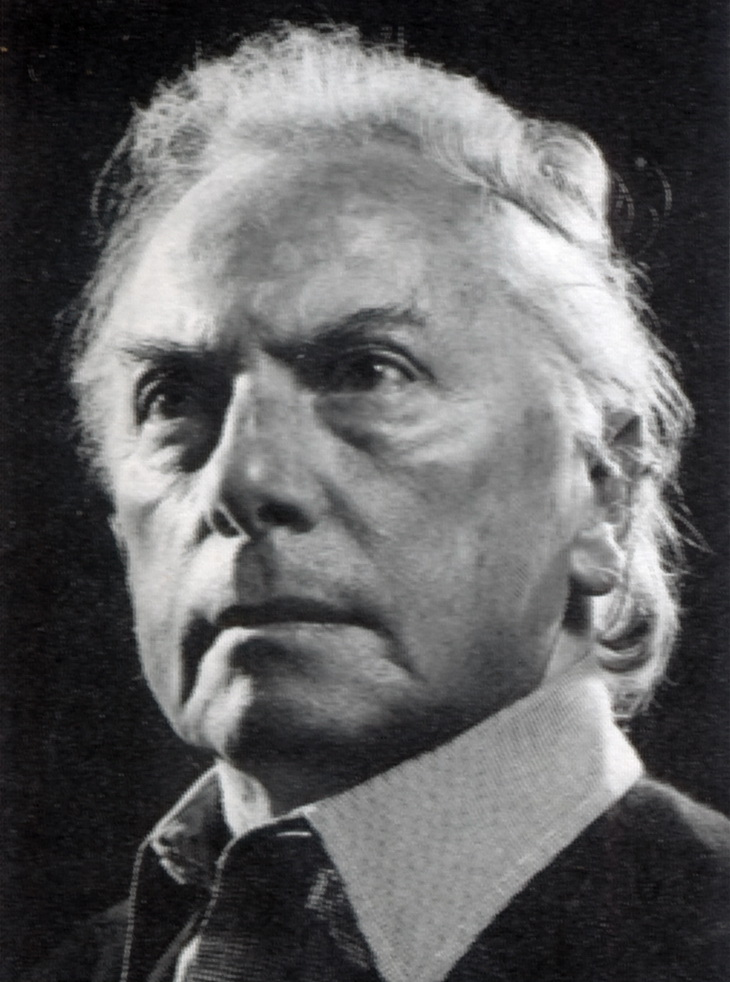
- Panufnik, early 1990s
- Born: 24 September 1914; Warsaw, Poland
- Died: 27 October 1991 (aged 77); London, England
- Occupations: Composer; conductor

Sir Andrzej Panufnik (pronounced: [ˈand͡ʐɛj paˈnufnik]; 24 September 1914 – 27 October 1991) was a Polish and British composer and conductor. He became established as one of the leading Polish composers, and as a conductor he was instrumental in the re-establishment of the Warsaw Philharmonic orchestra after World War II. He also served as Principal Conductor of the Kraków Philharmonic Orchestra.

After his increasing frustration with the extra-musical demands made on him by the country's regime, he defected to the United Kingdom in 1954, and took up British citizenship. In 1957, he was appointed chief conductor of the City of Birmingham Symphony Orchestra, a post he relinquished after two years to devote all his time to composition. In 1984, he became an honorary member of the Royal Academy of Music and in 1991 the composer received a British knighthood for his services to music.

== Biography ==
=== Childhood and studies ===
Panufnik was born in Warsaw, the second son of a violinist mother and an amateur (but renowned) violin-maker father. From an early age he was torn between an interest in music and a fascination with the mechanics of aeroplanes. His grandmother gave him piano lessons, but although he showed talent his studies were erratic. As a schoolboy he composed some successful popular tunes, but his father did not approve of his son's pursuing a musical career. Eventually his father relented, permitting the boy to study music provided he matriculated. By this time, Panufnik was too old to take the piano entrance examination for the Warsaw Conservatory, but succeeded in gaining admission as a percussion student. He soon left the percussion class to concentrate on studying composition and conducting; he worked hard and completed the course in much less time than normal.

Panufnik studied composition under Kazimierz Sikorski, the distinguished Polish composer and pedagogue. Although Sikorski provided him with an excellent education, he did not single out Panufnik as an exceptional student until the latter years of his studies. By contrast, it was another outstanding Polish composer, Witold Maliszewski, Panufnik's professor of the theory of musical forms, who first recognized Andrzej's extraordinary talent and told him that he possessed a unique gift for composition.

After graduating with distinction in 1936, his plans to travel to Vienna to study conducting for a year under Felix Weingartner were delayed by his being called up for National Service. Panufnik recalled how, on the night before his medical, he heard the national Polish medieval chant Bogurodzica on the wireless. This entirely captivated him, and he sat up late into the night drinking copious quantities of black coffee. The result of this was that he failed his medical examination and was excused from military duties. Instead he used the year's hiatus earning money and reputation composing film music.

Panufnik travelled to Vienna in 1937 for his studies with Weingartner. He also fulfilled his intention of studying music by the composers of the Second Viennese School, but while he applauded Arnold Schoenberg's imposition of constraints to give artistic unity to a composition, dodecaphonic music did not appeal to him. Panufnik returned to Poland before the end of his planned year-long stay, leaving shortly after the Anschluss when the political situation caused Weingartner to be removed from the Academy.

Panufnik also lived for some months in Paris and London, where he studied privately and composed his first symphony. He met Weingartner again in London, and the older conductor urged him to stay in England to avoid the consequences of the worsening international situation. Panufnik was determined, however, to return to Poland.

=== Panufnik's war ===
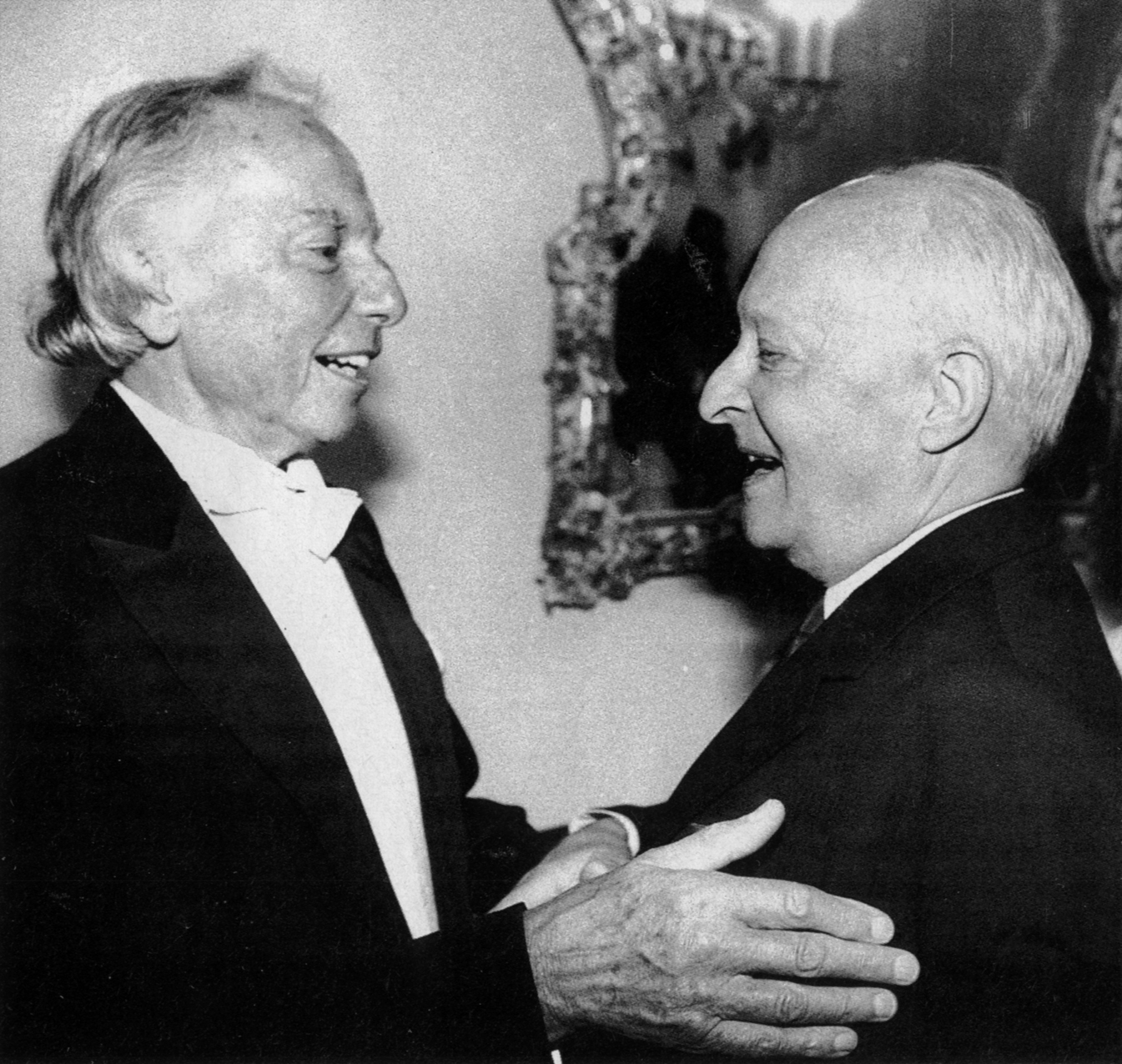
Witold Lutosławski (right) greets his old friend Panufnik in 1990

During the German occupation of Warsaw during World War II Panufnik formed a piano duo with his friend and fellow composer Witold Lutosławski, and they performed in cafés in Warsaw. This was the only way in which Poles could legitimately hear live music, as arranging concerts was impossible because the occupying forces had banned organised gatherings. Panufnik also composed some illegal Songs of Underground Resistance, especially "Warsaw Children" which became popular among the defiant Polish community. During this period he composed a Tragic Overture and a second symphony. Later, Panufnik was able to conduct a couple of charity concerts, at one of which his Tragic Overture was first performed. He fled from Warsaw with his ailing mother, leaving all his music behind in his apartment, just before the Warsaw Uprising in 1944. When Panufnik returned to the ruins of the city in the spring of 1945, to bury his brother's body and recover his own manuscripts, he discovered that despite having survived the widespread destruction, all of his scores had been discarded onto a bonfire by a stranger who had taken over his rooms.

=== Socialist realism ===
After World War II, Panufnik moved to Kraków where he found work composing film music for the Army Film Unit. Some of this inevitably was for propaganda films; Panufnik later recounted how for one film, The Electrification of the Villages, the director was unable to find a house without a supply of electricity, and had to demolish pylons and remove infrastructure to film it being built. Panufnik accepted the post of Principal Conductor with the Kraków Philharmonic Orchestra. He reconstructed some of his music that had been lost, starting with the Tragic Overture which was still fresh in his mind. Encouraged by this he also reconstructed his Piano Trio and Polish Peasant Songs. However, his first symphony did not prove so easy and, disappointed with the result, Panufnik decided that he would thereafter concentrate on composing new works.

Appointed Music Director of the defunct Warsaw Philharmonic Orchestra, traditionally Poland's leading orchestra, Panufnik set about engaging musicians and finding premises. When bureaucratic obstacles made the reconstitution of the orchestra difficult (for example, the lack of available living accommodation for the musicians) he resigned in protest. At this time he also fulfilled conducting engagements abroad, including guest conductor with the Berlin Philharmonic Orchestra. He was instructed to include his Tragic Overture as a reminder to Germany of their recent actions in Warsaw.

Around this time he started composing again, writing his Circle of Fifths for piano (later published as Twelve Miniature Studies). His Lullaby for string orchestra and two harps was inspired by the combination of the River Thames and the night sky, when he saw "dark clouds drifting across a brilliant full moon", as viewed from Waterloo Bridge, while he was visiting London. In its use of quarter tones and dense textures this broke new ground, both for Panufnik and for Polish music. Panufnik also composed a Sinfonia Rustica, deciding to give it a name rather than the designation "Symphony No. 1" out of feeling for his two lost works in the genre.

Panufnik became Vice-President of the newly constituted Union of Polish Composers (ZKP—Związek Kompozytorów Polskich), accepting the post after being urged to do so by his colleagues. However, in this capacity he found himself manoeuvred into positions which he did not support, at conferences whose nature was political rather than musical. At one of these conferences he met Zoltán Kodály who privately expressed a similar feeling of artistic helplessness to Panufnik's. He also encountered composers such as the English Alan Bush, who were sympathetic to the aims of Stalinist Socialism, and other composers on the political far-left such as Benjamin Frankel.

Adding to Panufnik's discomfiture, in the post-war period the government became increasingly interventionist in the arts. As a consequence of events in the Soviet Union, particularly the Zhdanov decree in 1948, it was dictated that composers should follow Soviet Realism, and that musical compositions, like all works of art, should reflect "the realities of Socialist Life". Panufnik later mused on the nebulous nature of Soviet Realism, quoting a Polish joke of the time that it was "like a mosquito: everyone knew it had a prick, but no-one had seen it". In this climate Panufnik, who was not a member of the Communist Party, attempted to tread an acceptable path by composing works based on historical Polish music; to this end he wrote his Old Polish Suite.

His Nocturne was singled out for criticism, and later General Włodzimierz Sokorski, Secretary of Culture, announced that Panufnik's Sinfonia Rustica had "ceased to exist". Panufnik later described the symphony as "a patently innocent work", and he found it particularly galling that one of the panel that decided on the work's proscription had earlier been on the panel that had awarded it first prize in the Chopin Composition Competition. The work was nevertheless published by the State Publishing House and, as Adrian Thomas has shown, performances of the work continued sporadically in Poland. While his compositions were branded at home as formalist, Panufnik was promoted abroad as a cultural export, both as composer and conductor. The authorities awarded him their highest accolade, Standard of Labour First Class.

In 1950, Panufnik visited the Soviet Union as part of a Polish delegation to study Soviet teaching methods. He met Dmitri Shostakovich, whom he had befriended at previous conferences, and Aram Khachaturian. During conversations with other composers, Panufnik was pressed to say what he was working on. Having to say something acceptable, he casually mentioned that he had an idea for a Symphony of Peace. This was seized upon, and on returning to Poland he was granted a stay in quiet surroundings so that he could finish the piece (Panufnik interpreted this as an order to complete it). He wrote a three movement work, ending with a setting of words by his friend, the poet Jarosław Iwaszkiewicz. Panufnik hoped to work his own conception of peace into the composition, rather than the official Soviet ideology. The piece was not a success with the authorities.

While he was writing the Symphony of Peace, he was struck by the beauty of an Irish woman he met, Marie Elizabeth O'Mahoney, who was known as "Scarlett" because of her likeness (both physical and temperamental) to Scarlett O'Hara from Margaret Mitchell's novel Gone with the Wind. Even though she was honeymooning with her third husband, she and Panufnik started an affair. Panufnik soon discovered she was epileptic, but in spite of his doubts the couple were married in 1951 and soon had a baby daughter, Oonagh. Panufnik now had a young family to support, and so threw himself into his lucrative work for the Film Unit. For one film he again turned to old Polish music, and he eventually adapted this score for the concert work Concerto in modo antico. In 1952 Panufnik composed a Heroic Overture, based on an idea he had conceived in 1939 inspired by the struggle of Poland against Nazi oppression. He submitted this work (without divulging its true meaning) for the 1952 pre-Olympic music competition in Helsinki, and it won. However, at home this overture was also branded "formalist".

In the spring of 1953, Panufnik was sent, with the Chamber Orchestra of the Warsaw Philharmonic Orchestra, on a tour of China, where he met prime-minister Zhou Enlai and, briefly, Chairman Mao. In his first days there, he heard devastating news that his adored Oonagh had been drowned while Scarlett had an epileptic attack while she was bathing her. After returning to Warsaw he was asked to write a letter that the government could send to western musicians, ostensibly from Panufnik, to sound them out as to their sympathies with the Polish "Peace Movement". Panufnik described this as effectively an order to spy for Moscow, and as the last in a "succession of final straws". Thus in 1954 Panufnik no longer felt able to reconcile his patriotic desire to remain a Polish composer in Poland with his contempt for the musical and political demands of the government. He decided to migrate to Britain to highlight the conditions in which Polish composers were being forced to work.

Bernard Jacobson described the events of Panufnik's escape from Poland as being straight out of a John le Carré novel. "Scarlett", whose father lived in Britain, easily obtained permission to travel to London, and while she was there she covertly asked Polish émigré friends to help. They contrived a conducting engagement in Switzerland as cover. Panufnik was anxious not to arouse suspicion by appearing too eager to accept the invitation when it arrived. While Panufnik was fulfilling the engagement, the Polish Legation in Switzerland became aware of his impending escape, and urgently recalled him to the Polish Embassy. Panufnik gave members of the Secret Police who were following him the slip during an alarming night-time taxi-ride through Zürich. He eventually boarded a flight for London, and was granted political asylum on arrival. His defection made international headlines. The Polish government branded him a traitor, immediately suppressing his music and any record of his conducting achievements, publicising numerous calumnies against him. Although a few subsequent Polish performances nevertheless did occur (as shown by the Panufnik scholar Adrian Thomas), with his defection Panufnik became a nonperson, and remained so until 1977.

=== Life in the West ===
Having left Poland without any money or possessions, income from occasional conducting engagements made it hard for Panufnik to make ends meet. He received financial support from fellow composers including Ralph Vaughan Williams and Arthur Benjamin; Panufnik was as heartened by the gesture of professional solidarity as by the money. His old friend the pianist Witold Małcużyński also helped by finding for Panufnik a wealthy patron. "Scarlett" Panufnik published a book about Panufnik's life in Poland and his escape, but its surmises and inaccuracies distressed Panufnik; Panufnik and Scarlett drifted apart, as she craved excitement and society while he wanted only peace and quiet for composing. They divorced in 1958.

In 1960, Panufnik visited the United States to visit Leopold Stokowski. Stokowski had given the American premiere of the Symphony of Peace in 1953, and in 1957 he conducted the world premiere of Panufnik's revised version of the symphony, entitled "Sinfonia Elegiaca", which is dedicated to all the victims of World War II. Stokowski gave American premieres also of Panufnik's "Katyń Epitaph", his "Universal Prayer" and "Sinfonia Sacra".

Panufnik continued to find it frustratingly difficult to get permission to travel to the States. In the wake of McCarthyism, the staff at the American Embassy in London were unhelpful, and treated him with suspicion: Panufnik was surprised to have to supply fingerprints, and he was pointedly asked more than once whether he had ever been a member of the Polish United Workers' Party. The irony of this difficulty, after his recent public defection to the west, was not lost on Panufnik.

Shortly after settling in Britain Panufnik was given an exclusive publishing contract with the prestigious firm of Boosey & Hawkes. They could get no answer from the Polish State publishers as to their long-term intentions for Panufnik's existing works, all of which had appeared under their imprint. Panufnik was therefore advised to introduce small revisions into all his existing works to avoid copyright problems when Boosey & Hawkes took these works into their catalogue. Just after he completed this task, he heard that the Polish State Publishers had finally confirmed that they had no further interest in their catalogue of Panufnik's music. Panufnik bemoaned the time wasted, and indeed the surviving original scores (copies of which had already been sent to some libraries in the West, including Harvard University) show that Panufnik's revisions excised some of the more radical passages in these works. Nevertheless, all the music he wrote before 1955 continues to be performed in the revised editions. For two years from 1957 to 1959 Panufnik's financial situation eased slightly when he was appointed Principal Conductor of the City of Birmingham Symphony Orchestra. The orchestra was keen to keep him, but preparing for fifty concerts a year prevented Panufnik from devoting enough time to composing.

In 1959, Panufnik became romantically involved with Winsome Ward, who was diagnosed with cancer the following year. During this time, Panufnik, who had been composing his "Autumn Music" with poetic intentions, changed it into a work with tragic connotations. He still had to complete his Piano Concerto for Birmingham and to fulfil his commission for his Sinfonia Sacra. In 1960 he met author and photographer Camilla Jessel, then aged twenty-two, who had worked as a personal assistant in the United States, and whose brother, Toby Jessel, was in politics. The British MP Neil Marten (who had been the person at the British Foreign Office responsible for looking after Panufnik's defection) suggested that Camilla Jessel could help him with his correspondence. Panufnik accepted, and she rapidly discovered that he had not replied to letters offering conducting engagements and enquiring about commissions. Accepting these engagements and commissions gave Panufnik the resources to allow him to devote more time to composition. In 1963, Panufnik entered his newly completed Sinfonia Sacra for a prestigious international competition in Monaco for the best orchestral work: it won first prize.

He became a British citizen in 1961. After Winsome Ward died in 1962, Panufnik and Jessel were drawn increasingly together, and they were married in November 1963. They moved into a house near the Thames in Twickenham, Greater London, where at last Panufnik had the peace to concentrate entirely on composition. His works were in demand by such major figures as Leopold Stokowski, Seiji Ozawa, André Previn and Sir Georg Solti, as well as Yehudi Menuhin who commissioned a violin concerto, and Mstislav Rostropovich who commissioned a cello concerto. He also received 3 commissions from the London Symphony Orchestra and commissions for Centenary symphonies from both Boston and Chicago. The Royal Philharmonic Society commissioned his Ninth Symphony, "Sinfonia di Speranza". Panufnik refused to return to Poland until democracy was restored in 1990. He was knighted by Queen Elizabeth II in 1991 New Year Honours List.

Panufnik's daughter by his second wife Camilla, Roxanna Panufnik (b. 1968), is also a composer.

=== Death ===
Panufnik died in Twickenham, aged 77, and was buried in Richmond Cemetery.

== Legacy ==
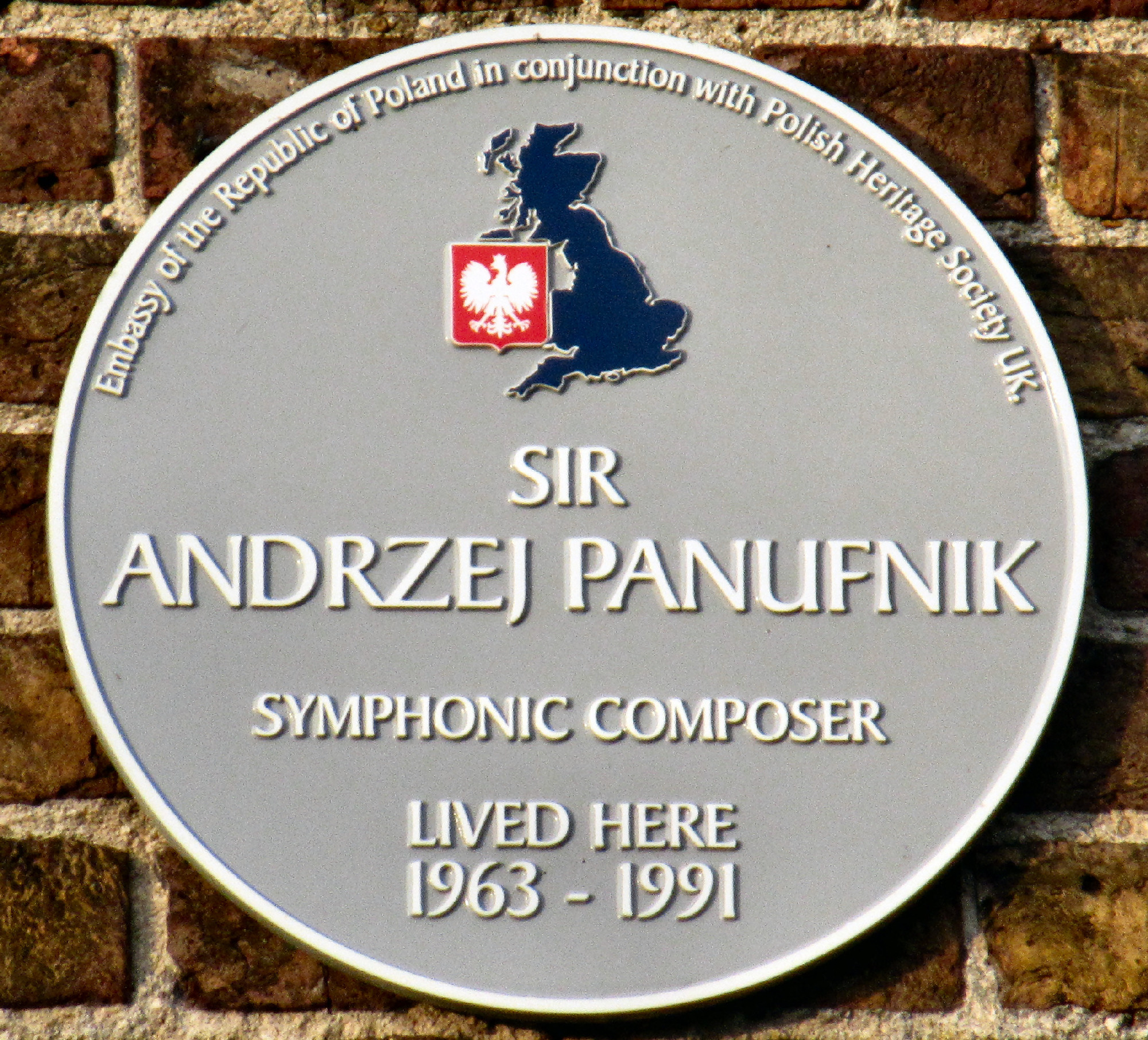
Plaque, Riverside House, Twickenham

Panufnik was posthumously awarded the Order of Polonia Restituta by Poland. Following his death Sir Georg Solti wrote that "he was an important composer and first-class conductor, the finest protagonist of the European tradition of music making."

In 2014, his centenary year, a number of celebratory concerts and events took place. Highlights included symphony performances, in February, by the London Symphony Orchestra and Warsaw Philharmonic Orchestra, two orchestras that had particularly close associations with Panufnik. A special concert on 24 September, his birthday, by the City of Birmingham Symphony Orchestra included performances of the Piano Concerto and Sinfonia Elegiaca. A Panufnik day, on 30 November, at Kings Place in London featured the Brodsky Quartet. In November, the São Paulo Symphony Orchestra gave two performances of the Tragic Overture with Stanislaw Skrowaczewski conducting. Also in 2014, the German record label Classic Produktion Osnabruck completed the publication of an eight-volume cycle of Panufnik's symphonic works, conducted by Łukasz Borowicz. In 2014 the Polish Heritage Society UK installed a plaque on his house in Twickenham.

== Works ==
The manuscripts and parts of a number of early compositions were lost as a consequence of the Warsaw Uprising in 1944. Panufnik reconstructed some of these in 1945.

=== Orchestral ===
- Symphonies
  - (First Symphony: 1939, lost 1944, reconstructed 1945, later withdrawn and destroyed by the composer)
  - (Second Symphony: 1941, lost 1944)
  - Sinfonia Rustica (Symphony No. 1) (1948, revised 1955)
  - Sinfonia Elegiaca (Symphony No. 2) (1957, revised 1966, incorporates material from the discarded Symphony of Peace)
  - Sinfonia Sacra (Symphony No. 3) (1963)
  - Sinfonia Concertante (Symphony No. 4), for flute, harp and small string orchestra (1973)
  - Sinfonia di Sfere (Symphony No. 5) (1974–75)
  - Sinfonia Mistica (Symphony No. 6) (1977)
  - Metasinfonia (Symphony No. 7), for solo organ, timpani and string orchestra (1978)
  - Sinfonia Votiva (Symphony No. 8) (1981, revised 1984)
  - Symphony No. 9, Sinfonia di Speranza (1986, revised 1990)
  - Symphony No. 10 (1988, revised 1990)
- Symphonic Variations (1935–36, lost 1944)
- Symphonic Allegro (1936, lost 1944)
- Symphonic Image (1936, lost 1944)
- Little Overture (c. 1937, lost 1944)
- Tragic Overture (1942, lost 1944, reconstructed 1945, revised 1955)
- Divertimento for Strings (adapted from music by Feliks Janiewicz, 1947, revised 1955)
- Lullaby (1947, revised 1955)
- Nocturne (1947, revised 1955)
- Old Polish Suite, based on 16th and 17th century Polish works (1950, revised 1955)
- Heroic Overture (1952, revised 1969)
- Rhapsody (1956)
- Polonia (1959)
- Autumn Music, for three flutes, three clarinets, percussion, celesta, piano, harp, violas, cellos, and double basses (1962, revised 1965)
- Landscape, for string orchestra (1962, revised 1965)
- Jagiellonian Triptych, for string orchestra (based on early Polish works, 1966)
- Katyń Epitaph (1967. revised 1969)
- Concerto Festivo, for orchestra [without conductor] (1979)
- Paean, for brass ensemble (1980)
- Arbor Cosmica, for twelve string soloists or string orchestra (1983)
- Harmony, for chamber orchestra (1989)

=== Concertante ===
- Concerto in modo antico, for solo trumpet, two harps, harpsichord and string orchestra [originally titled Koncert Gotycki, "Gothic Concerto"] (based on early Polish works, 1951, revised 1955)
- Piano Concerto (1962, revised 1970, re-composed 1972, first movement Intrada added 1982)
- Hommage à Chopin, for flute and small string orchestra (1966 arrangement of 1949 vocal work)
- Violin Concerto (1971)
- Concertino for timpani, percussion and string orchestra (1979–80)
- Bassoon Concerto (1985)
- Cello Concerto (1991)

=== Vocal ===
- Psalm, for soloist, chorus and orchestra (1936, Panufnik's diploma piece, lost 1944)
- Five Polish Peasant Songs, for sopranos or trebles, two flutes, two clarinets and bass clarinet (1940, lost 1944, reconstructed 1945, anonymous Polish text)
- Four Underground Resistance Songs, for voice or unison voices and piano (1943–44, Polish text by Stanisław Ryszard Dobrowolski)
- Hommage à Chopin, vocalises for soprano and piano, originally titled Suita Polska (1949, revised 1955)
- Symphony of Peace, for chorus and orchestra (1951, subsequently withdrawn and not included in the composer's symphonic canon, setting of Polish text by Jarosław Iwaszkiewicz)
- Song to the Virgin Mary, for unaccompanied chorus or six solo voices (1964, revised 1969, anonymous Latin text)
- Universal Prayer, for soprano, alto, tenor and bass soloists, chorus, three harps and organ (1968–69, setting of English text by Alexander Pope)
- Invocation for Peace, for trebles, two trumpets and two trombones (1972)
- Winter Solstice, for soprano and baritone soloists, chorus, three trumpets, three trombones, timpani and glockenspiel (1972, English text by Camilla Jessel)
- Love Song, for mezzo-soprano and harp or piano (1976, optional string orchestra part added in 1991, setting of English text by Sir Philip Sidney)
- Dreamscape, for mezzo-soprano and piano (1977, wordless)
- Prayer to the Virgin of Skempe, for solo voice or unison chorus, organ and instrumental ensemble (1990, setting of Polish text by Jerzy Peterkiewicz)

=== Ballets ===
While Panufnik's music has been used often for dance, two ballet scores were prepared by the composer using adaptations of existing works with new material.

- Cain and Abel (1968, a reworking of Sinfonia Sacra and Tragic Overture with new material)
- Miss Julie (1970, a reworking of Nocturne, Rhapsody, Autumn Music and Polonia with new material)

=== Chamber ===
- Classical Suite, for string quartet (1933, lost 1944)
- Piano Trio (1934, lost 1944, reconstructed 1945, revised 1977)
- Quintetto Accademico, for flute, oboe, clarinet, horn and bassoon (1953, revised 1956, lost, was rediscovered in 1994)
- Triangles, for three flutes and three cellos (1972)
- String Quartet No. 1 (1976)
- String Quartet No. 2 Messages (1980)
- Song to the Virgin Mary, for string sextet (1987 arrangement of 1964 vocal work)
- String Sextet Train of Thoughts (1987)
- String Quartet No. 3 Wycinanki ("Cutouts") (1990)

=== Instrumental ===
- Variations, for piano (1933, lost 1944)
- Twelve Miniature Studies, for piano, originally titled Circle of Fifths (1947, Book I revised 1955, Book II revised 1964)
- Reflections, for piano (1968)
- Pentasonata, for piano (1984)

=== Pieces for young players ===
- Two Lyric Pieces [1: woodwind and brass, 2: strings] (1963)
- Thames Pageant, cantata for young players and singers (1969, English text by Camilla Jessel)
- A Procession for Peace (1982–83)

== Notes ==
Cultural offices
Preceded by Olgierd Straszyński	Music directors, Warsaw Philharmonic Orchestra; 1946–1947	Succeeded by Jan Maklakiewicz
