= Kungsbacka Piano Trio =

Swedish chamber music ensemble

The Kungsbacka Piano Trio is a Swedish classical chamber music ensemble.

== Biography and career ==
The Kungsbacka Piano Trio was founded in 1997, and is named after the Swedish town where it first performed, and where has established an annual festival. Composed of Jesper Svedberg, cello, Simon Crawford-Phillips, piano, and Malin Broman, violin, the trio has performed in a number of festivals in Europe, North and South America and Australia. The trio notably won the first prize at the Melbourne International Chamber Music Competition in 1999, and has been awarded the Royal Swedish Academy of Music's Interpret Prize.

The Kungsbacka Piano Trio has recorded several discs for the Naxos and Bis labels, including works by Schubert, Schumann, Haydn, Mozart and Rehnqvist. The trio has commissioned works by a number of contemporary composers, including Karin Rehnqvist, Mark-Anthony Turnage and others.

The members of the Kungsbacka Piano Trio teach at Gothenburg University's School of Music where they give lectures, masterclasses and concerts throughout the year. The trio is also Associate Ensemble at the Guildhall School of Music and Drama.
