= Étude No. 11 (Villa-Lobos) =

Heitor Villa-Lobos's Étude No. 11, one of his Twelve Études for Guitar, was first published by Max Eschig, Paris, in 1953.

== Structure ==
The piece is in E minor and is marked Lent – Animé – Poco meno – Animé – Lent.

== Analysis ==
Étude No. 11 is a study in arpeggios and chords, involving difficult left-hand stretches and an unusual emphasis on the use of the right-hand thumb. Like the preceding and following studies (and unlike the earlier ones), it is in ternary (ABA) form, with bell-like effects marking the middle section.
