= Malin Broman =

Swedish violinist

Malin Broman (born 24 May 1975) is a Swedish violinist. She is concertmaster of the Swedish Radio Symphony Orchestra, a member of the Kungsbacka Piano Trio, the Nash Ensemble of London, and the Stockholm Syndrome Ensemble.

== Career ==
Broman is a frequently hired violinist, both as a soloist and as a chamber musician. She also teaches at the Guildhall School of Music and Drama in London. She previously taught at the College of Stage and Music at the University of Gothenburg.

Broman is the grand-niece of Sten Broman. She was a summer host in Sveriges Radio P1 on 23 July 2021.

In 2020, during COVID lockdowns, she recorded a performance of Mendelssohn's Octet, in which she played all eight parts.

She gave the first performance of Helen Grime's Violin Concerto.

Broman plays a Stradivarius violin and a viola by Luigi Bajoni, which are loaned to her by the Järnåker Foundation.

== Prizes ==
In 1994 Broman won third prize in the Eurovision competition for young musicians, and in the same year she won first prize and the audience prize in the Washington International Competition for Strings, Washington DC. In 1996 she won second prize in the Carl Nielsen International Music Competition in Odense, Denmark.

== Recordings ==
Broman has recorded on the Hyperion, Alba, Bis and Naxos labels.

== Awards ==
- Sten A Olsson's cultural grant (2000).
- Member of the Royal Academy of Music, Sweden (2008).
- HM The King's medal in gold of the 8th size (2019) for significant contributions to Swedish music life.
- The Medal for the Promotion of the Sound Arts, Sweden (2021).
