= National Philharmonic, Warsaw =

National Philharmonic in Warsaw
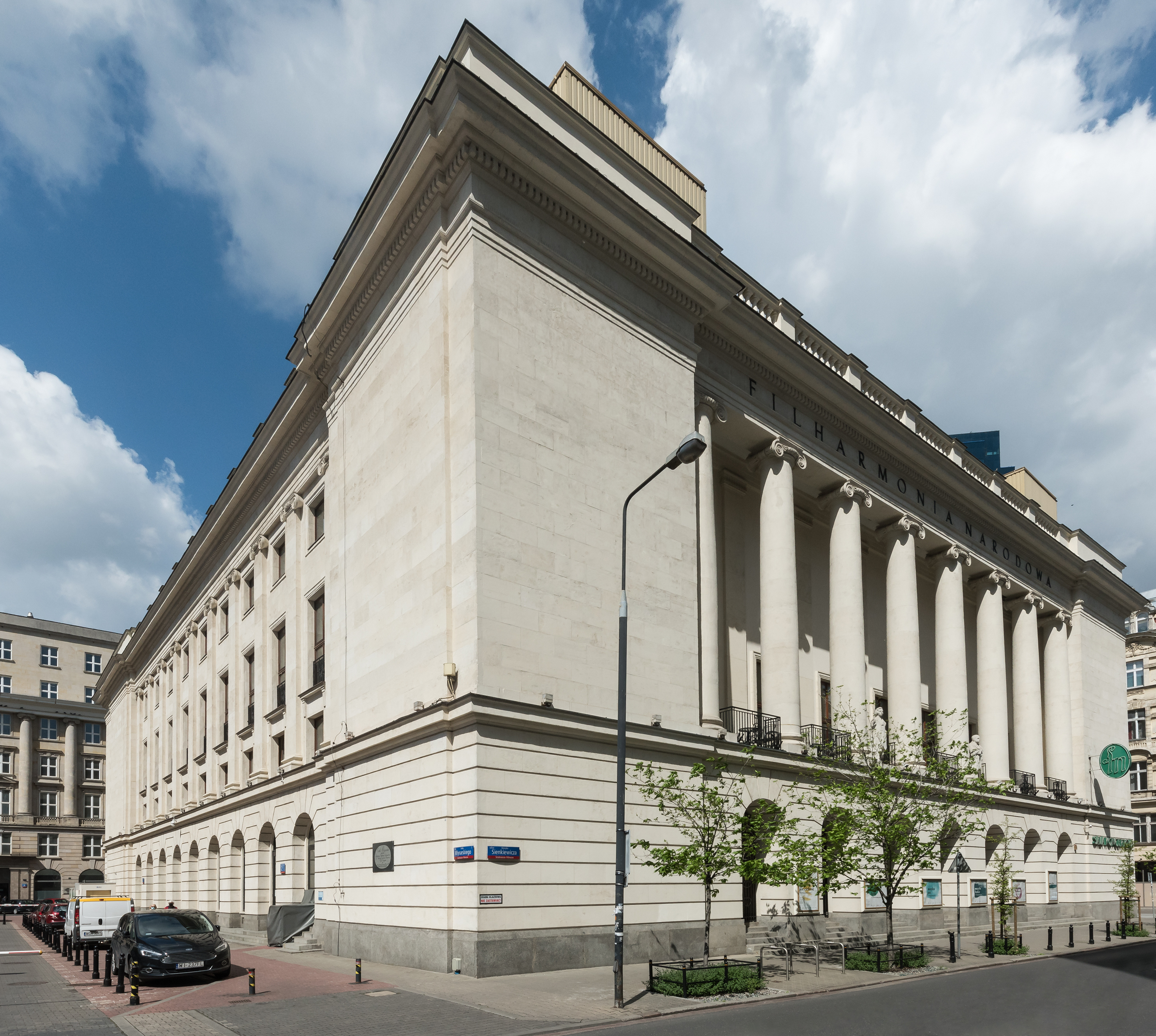

- Location in Poland

General information
- Type: Concert Hall
- Architectural style: Socialist realism, Eclecticist
- Location: Jasna 5, Warsaw, Poland
- Coordinates: 52°14′03″N 21°00′40″E
- Current tenants: Warsaw National Philharmonic Orchestra
- Construction started: 1900
- Completed: 1901; 125 years ago
- Inaugurated: 5 November 1901

Design and construction
- Architects: Karol Kozłowski (1901); Eugeniusz Szparkowski (1955)

Other information
- Public transit access: Świętokrzyska

Website
- filharmonia.pl

The National Philharmonic in Warsaw (Polish: Filharmonia Narodowa w Warszawie) is a Polish cultural institution, located at 5 Jasna Street in Warsaw. The building was built between 1900 and 1901, under the direction of Karol Kozłowski, to be reconstructed in 1955 by Eugeniusz Szparkowski. The director of the institution is Wojciech Nowak. It is the main venue of the Warsaw National Philharmonic Orchestra.

Since 1955, the institution hosts the International Chopin Piano Competition. The building also hosts the annual festival Warsaw Autumn.

== History ==
The first building of the Warsaw Philharmonic was designed by Karol Kozłowski. It was constructed in the years 1900-1901. The official inauguration took place on 5 November 1901. The orchestra was conducted by Emil Młynarski with Ignacy Jan Paderewski appearing as a solo artist, playing his own piano concerto as well as several pieces by Chopin. The bass singer Wiktor Grąbczewski performed a solo part in a cantata by Władysław Żeleński.

The original building was based on European philharmonics and operas of the nineteenth century, primarily on the Paris Opera. It had a rich Eclecticist design with elements of contemporarily interpreted Neo-romanticism and the Baroque Revival. The building had three floors. Originally, the main entrance was located from the Jasna Street. The sculptures on the facade were made by Stanisław R. Lewandowski and Władysław Mazur.

The construction was funded by banker Leopold Julian Kronenberg and pianist Ignacy Jan Paderewski among others.

The facade of the original building was decorated with sculptures portraying characters from the works of Wolfgang Amadeus Mozart, Ludwig van Beethoven, Fryderyk Chopin, and Stanisław Moniuszko. The main concert hall had an area of 730m^{2} and capacity for 2000 people.

The work of the Philharmonic was interrupted by the Invasion of Poland in September of 1939. The building was burned during the Siege of Warsaw and then bombed during the Warsaw Uprising in 1944, receiving severe damage.

The rebuilt Philharmonic was opened on 21 February 1955, on the day of inauguration of the V International Chopin Piano Competition. Built based on a design by Eugeniusz Szparkowski and Henryk Białobrzeski, the building lost its original rich decorations which were replaced by the esthetic of Socialist realism. The main entrance was moved to Sienkiewicz Street. The main concert hall has capacity for 1072 people and the hall for chamber music has capacity for 378 people.

== Gallery ==
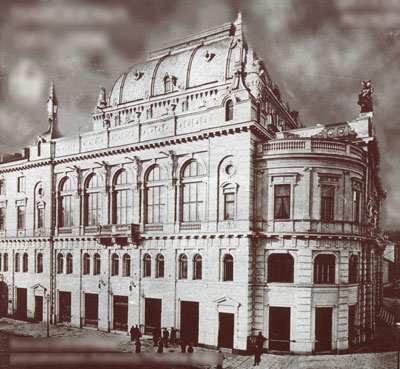
Warsaw Philharmonic, 1901

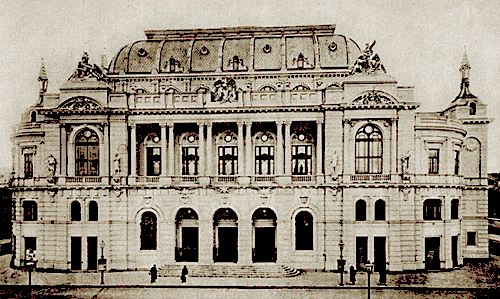
Warsaw Philharmonic, c.1901

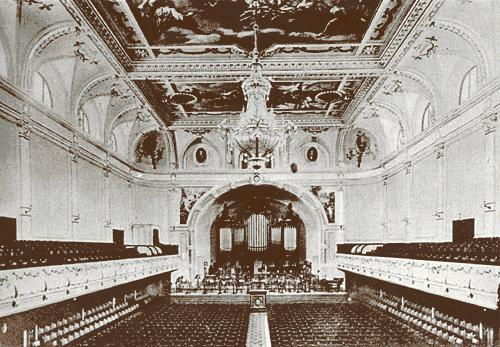
Interior of the Warsaw Philharmonic, c.1901

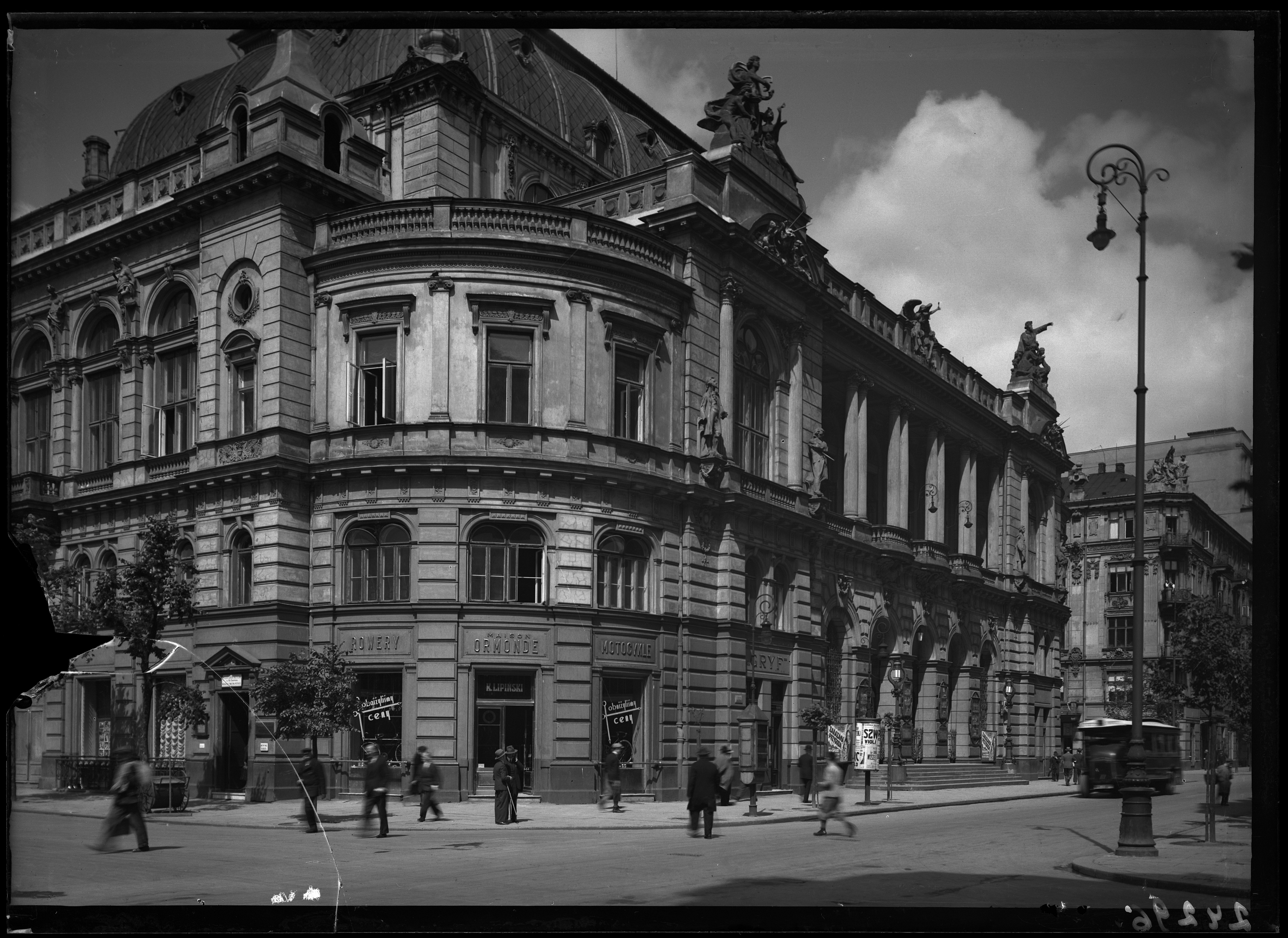
Warsaw Philharmonic, 1939
