= Veracini =

Veracini is a surname. Notable people with the surname include:

- Agostino Veracini (1689–1762), Italian painter and engraver, cousin of Francesco
- Antonio Veracini (1659–1733), Italian composer and violinist
- Francesco Maria Veracini (1690–1768), Italian composer and violinist
