= Józef Ozimiński =

Polish violinist and conductor

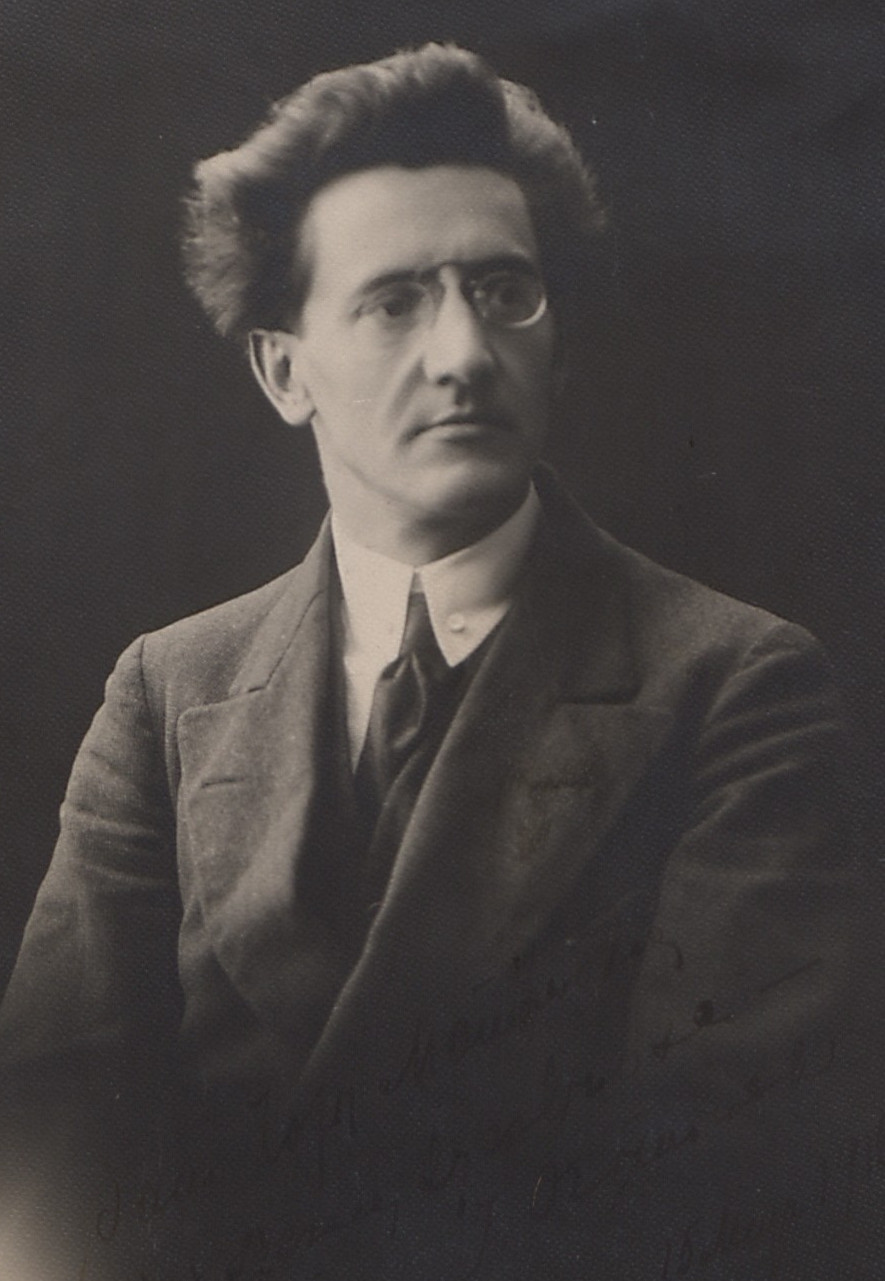
Ozimiński in 1918

Józef Ozimiński (6 December 1877, Warsaw – 8 July 1945, Warsaw) was a Polish violinist and conductor.

His teachers included Stanisław Barcewicz.

On 1 November 1922 in Warsaw, he was the soloist in the premiere performance of Karol Szymanowski's Violin Concerto No. 1.

Cultural offices
Preceded by Roman Chojnacki	Music directors, Warsaw Philharmonic Orchestra; 1938–1939	Succeeded by Olgierd Straszyński
