= Zdzisław Birnbaum =

Polish musician

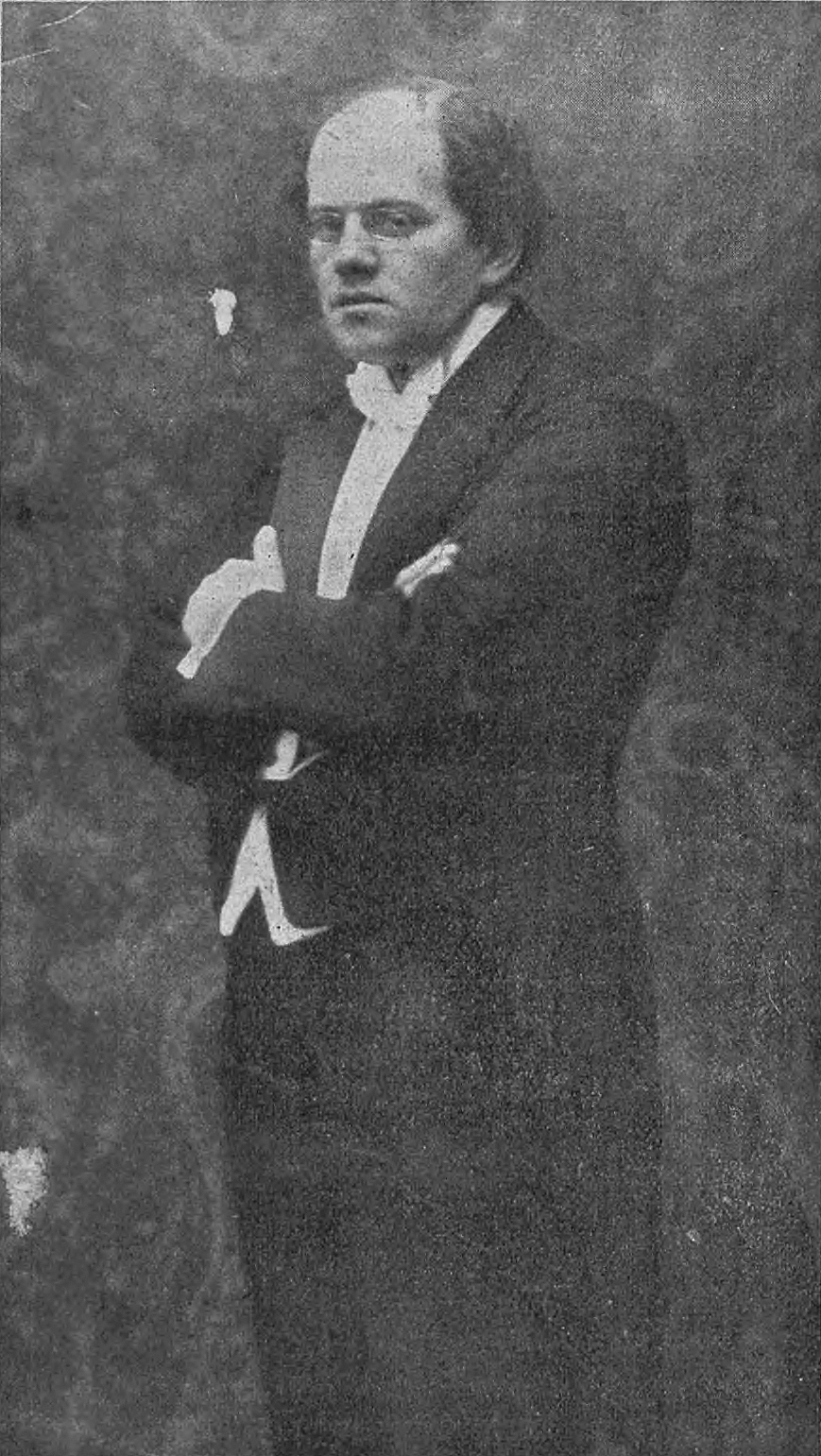
Zdzisław Birnbaum

Zdzisław Birnbaum (28 February 1878 in Warsaw – 27 [?] September 1921 in Berlin) was a Polish violinist and conductor.

Cultural offices
Preceded by Grzegorz Fitelberg	Music directors, Warsaw Philharmonic Orchestra; 1911–1914, 1916–1918	Succeeded by Roman Chojnacki
