= Violin Concerto (Panufnik) =

The Violin Concerto, composed by Andrzej Panufnik in 1971, is a concerto for violin and string orchestra. The work was written for and at the request of Yehudi Menuhin.

The work has three movements:

1. Rubato, which commences and concludes with cadenzas for the soloist
2. Adagio
3. Vivace

The work features long, singing melodic lines for the soloist. Panufnik wrote of the work: "When Yehudi Menuhin asked me to compose a violin concerto for him, I immediately had in mind his unique spiritual and poetic qualities and I felt I should provide a vehicle which would accentuate these rare gifts, and not obscure his deep inner musicianship by virtuoso pyrotechnics."

Menuhin premiered the work on 18 July 1972 at the Guildhall, London (City of London Festival), with the Menuhin Festival Orchestra under Panufnik's baton.
