= National Philharmonic Orchestra in Warsaw =

Polish orchestra

- Orchestra
- Official logo
- Founded: 1901; 125 years ago
- Location: Warsaw, Poland
- Concert hall: Warsaw Philharmonic
- Principal conductor: Krzysztof Urbański
- Website: filharmonia.pl

The National Philharmonic Orchestra in Warsaw (Polish: Orkiestra Filharmonii Narodowej w Warszawie), commonly known as the Warsaw Philharmonic (Polish: Filharmonia Warszawska) internationally and branded as the National Philharmonic (Polish: Filharmonia Narodowa) domestically, is a Polish orchestra based in Warsaw, Poland. Founded in 1901, its home is the Warsaw Philharmonic Hall.

== History ==
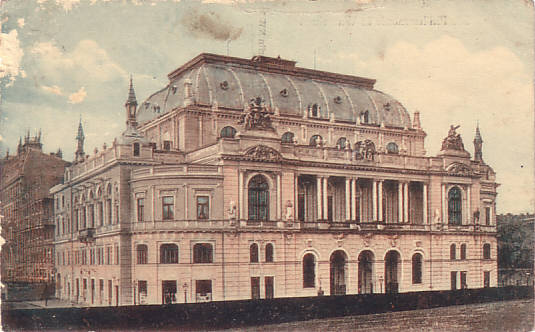
Warsaw Philharmonic Hall in 1918. The building was completely destroyed in a German air raid on Warsaw in 1939. A new concert hall was built after the war in a popular style.

The orchestra was conceived on initiative of an assembly of Polish aristocrats and financiers, as well as musicians. Between 1901 and the outbreak of World War II in 1939, several virtuoso- and conductor-composers regularly performed their works with the orchestra, including Edvard Grieg, Arthur Honegger, Ruggiero Leoncavallo, Sergei Prokofiev, Sergei Rachmaninoff, Maurice Ravel, Camille Saint-Saëns, Richard Strauss, and Igor Stravinsky. Among the other musicians who played with the Philharmonic were pianists Ignacy Jan Paderewski, Arthur Rubinstein, Vladimir Horowitz and Claudio Arrau, violinists Jascha Heifetz and Pablo de Sarasate, and cellist Pablo Casals. The Philharmonic has played host to the Chopin International Piano Competition since the contest began in 1927, and also appeared at the inaugural Wieniawski International Violin Competition (1935) and the Universal Festival of Polish Art (1937).

The orchestra underwent an eclipse during the Second World War, during which it lost half its members to the war, as well as its elegant building, which had been erected and modeled after the Paris Opera around the start of the 20th century by Karol Kozłowski. In 1947, the orchestra resumed its regular season, but had to wait until 1955 for its home to be finally rebuilt, albeit in a new style. When the building was dedicated on 21 February, the Philharmonic was proclaimed the National Orchestra of Poland.

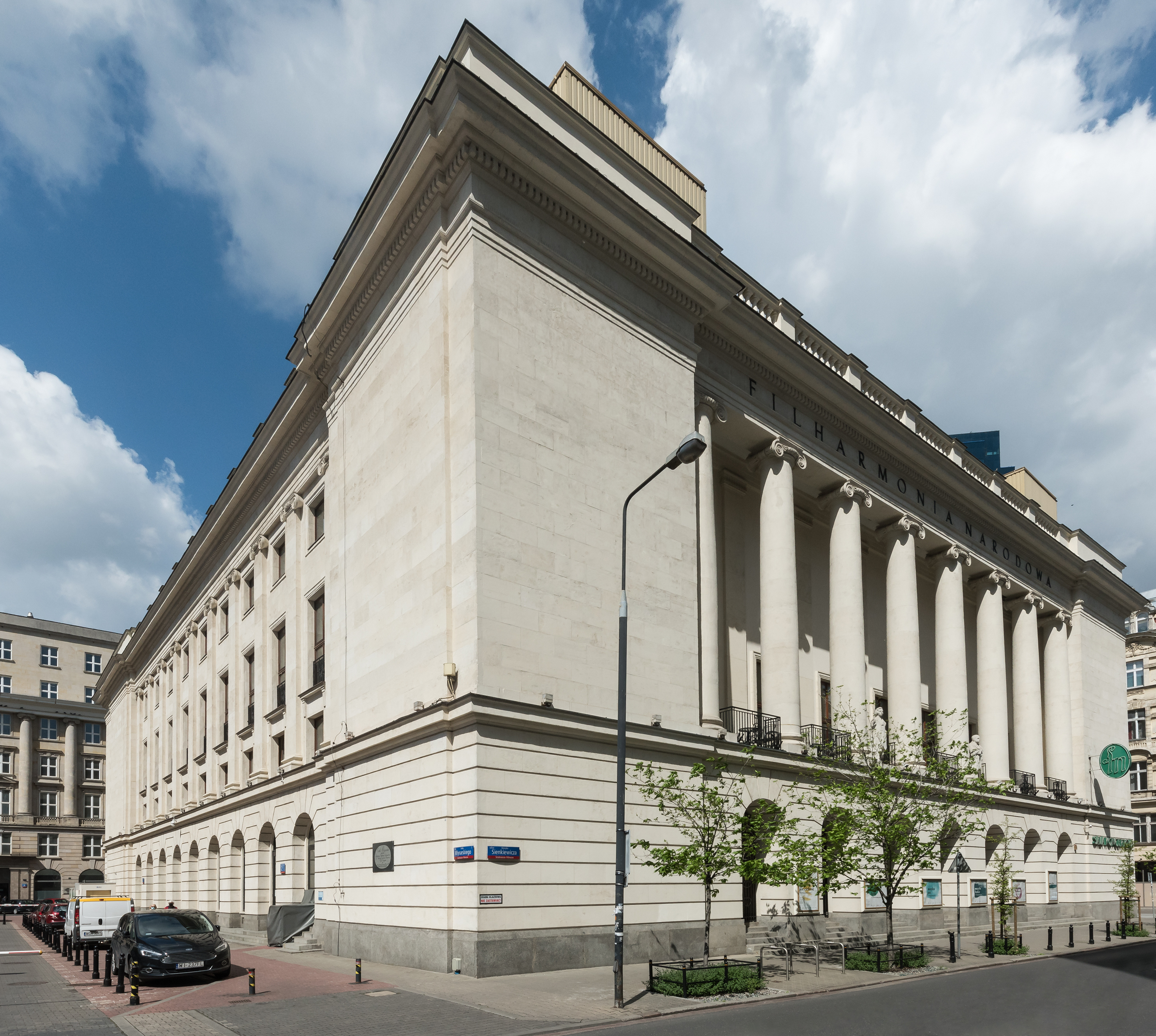
Warsaw Philharmonic Concert Hall today. The front elevation colonnade over arcade has been recreated.

The conductor Witold Rowicki was responsible for helping to modernize the ensemble and ensuring the orchestra cultivated Polish music both old and recent, as represented by the works of Frédéric Chopin, Witold Lutosławski and Henryk Górecki, without failing also to refine its mastery of the world repertoire. At home, the orchestra performs in the Warsaw Autumn International Festival of Contemporary Music besides accompanying the final rounds of the Chopin International Piano Competitions.

In June 2024, the orchestra announced the appointment of Krzysztof Urbański as its next artistic director, effective with the 2024–2025 season, with an initial contract of four years. This appointment was initially reported in January 2024, with a different contract duration, since revised.

=== Recordings ===
In the 1945 to 1989 period, the orchestra recorded for Polskie Nagrania Muza, the Polish state recording company, Eterna, Telefunken and Philips. After 1989 it recorded for Philips, Polygram, MMC Recordings, Accord and Naxos.

The Philharmonic has recorded music for several anime series. Notable shows include Gankutsuou: The Count of Monte Cristo, Cowboy Bebop, Soukyuu no Fafner, Giant Robo: The Animation, Ah! My Goddess: The Movie, Princess Nine, Vision of Escaflowne, Wolf's Rain, Hellsing Ultimate, Genesis of Aquarion, and Fullmetal Alchemist: Brotherhood. It has also recorded music for Konami's Suikoden II, Namco's Ace Combat 5: The Unsung War, and together with the Hollywood Session Orchestra, for the SEGA action-RPG Phantasy Star Universe. The orchestra was involved in a major performance for the film Avalon, composed by Kenji Kawai, and part of a performance is shown in the film. It also played the soundtrack for the film Battle Royale. Most recently, they have recorded music for the Square Enix role-playing video game Final Fantasy XIII.

== Music directors ==
- Emil Młynarski (1901–1905)
- Zygmunt Noskowski (1906–1908)
- Henryk Melcer-Szczawiński (1908–1909)
- Grzegorz Fitelberg (1909–1911)
- Zdzisław Birnbaum (1911–1914, 1916–1918)
- Roman Chojnacki (1918–1938)
- Józef Ozimiński (1938–1939)
- Olgierd Straszyński (1945–1946)
- Andrzej Panufnik (1946–1947)
- Jan Maklakiewicz (1947–1948)
- Witold Rudziński (1948–1949)
- Władysław Raczkowski (1949–1950)
- Witold Rowicki (1950–1955, 1958–1977)
- Bohdan Wodiczko (1955–1958)
- Kazimierz Kord (1977–2001)
- Antoni Wit (2002–2013)
- Jacek Kaspszyk (2013–2019)
- Andrey Boreyko (2019–2024)
- Krzysztof Urbański (2024–present)

== See also ==
- Sinfonia Varsovia (Warsaw)
- National Forum of Music (Wrocław)
- NOSPR (Katowice)
- Music of Poland
