= Nina Stemme =

Swedish opera singer (born 1963)

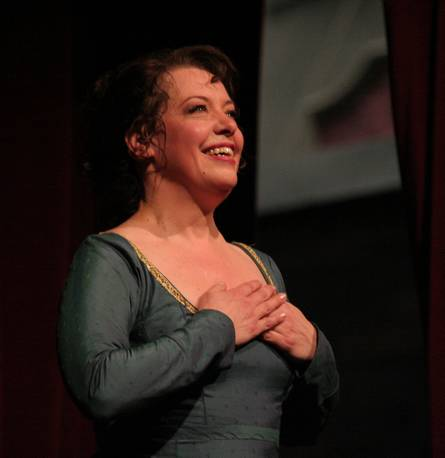
- Stemme as Tosca, Vienna, 2012
- Born: Nina Maria Thöldte; 11 May 1963; Stockholm, Sweden
- Occupation: Operatic soprano
- Title: Hovsångerska; Kammersängerin
- Awards: Gramophone Award; International Opera Awards

Nina Maria Stemme (born Thöldte, 11 May 1963) is a Swedish dramatic soprano opera singer.

Stemme "is regarded by today's opera fans as our era's greatest Wagnerian soprano". In 2010, Michael Kimmelman wrote of one of Stemme's performances in Richard Wagner's opera Die Walküre, "As for Brünnhilde, Nina Stemme sang gloriously. It's hard to recall anyone's sounding more commanding or at ease in the part, and that includes Kirsten Flagstad".

== Early life and education ==
Born in Stockholm as Nina Maria Thöldte, she played piano and viola in her youth. She attended Adolf Fredrik's Music School, a high-profile song-and-chorus school in Stockholm. During a year as an exchange student at Langley High School in McLean, Virginia, she joined the school chorus, sang solos and won awards. She changed her last name to her mother's last name Stemme.

Parallel to her studies of business administration and economics at the Stockholm University, Stemme followed a two-year course at the Stockholm Operastudio. Her debut as Cherubino in Cortona, Italy, in 1989 made Stemme decide to follow a professional singer's career; her studies at the University College of Opera in Stockholm were completed in 1994. In addition to two minor roles at the Royal Swedish Opera in Stockholm, she also sang Rosalinde (Die Fledermaus), Mimì (La bohème), Euridice in Gluck's Orfeo ed Euridice, and Diana (La fedeltà premiata by Haydn).

She sang in two singing competitions, Operalia, The World Opera Competition and Cardiff Singer of the World. As winner of Operalia in 1993, Stemme was invited by Plácido Domingo, founder of Operalia, to appear with him in a concert at La Bastille (1993); the same concert also took place on 1 January 1994 in Munich.

== Career ==
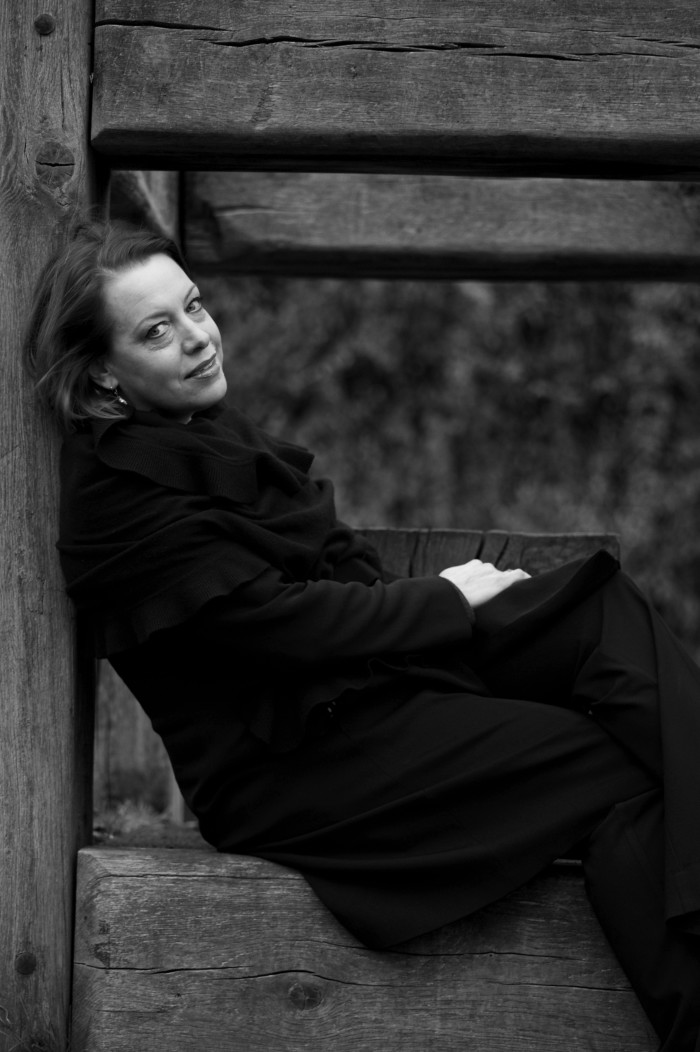
Nina Stemme, Notorious, GöteborgsOperan, 2015. Photographer – Neda Navaee

Since her 1989 operatic debut as Cherubino, Stemme has appeared with many opera companies, including the Royal Swedish Opera Stockholm, the Vienna State Opera, La Scala Milano, Semperoper Dresden, Grand Théâtre de Genève, the Zurich Opera, Teatro di San Carlo Naples, Gran Teatre del Liceu Barcelona, Opéra Bastille Paris, Bayerische Staatsoper Munich, Covent Garden London, Teatro Real Madrid, Teatro Colón Buenos Aires, the Metropolitan Opera New York, San Francisco Opera, as well as at the Bayreuth, Salzburg, Savonlinna, Glyndebourne and Bregenz festivals.

Her roles include Rosalinde, Mimì in La bohème, Cio-Cio San in Madama Butterfly, Turandot, Tosca, Manon Lescaut, Suor Angelica, Euridice, Katerina in Lady Macbeth of Mtsensk, the Countess in Le nozze di Figaro, Marguerite, Agathe, Marie, Nyssia (König Kandaules), Jenůfa, Marschallin, Eva, Elisabeth, Elsa, Senta, Sieglinde, Elisabeth in Tannhäuser and Isolde. This last brought her critical acclaim at Glyndebourne Festival Opera in 2003, on disc for EMI Classics with Plácido Domingo, Antonio Pappano and the chorus and orchestra of the Royal Opera, Covent Garden released in 2005 and most recently at the Bayreuth Festival in 2005 and again in 2006. In 2007 Stemme returned in the role of Isolde to Glyndebourne Festival Opera where she made her debut in the role.

In 2006, Stemme sang Maria in the premiere of Sven-David Sandström's Ordet – en passion, on 24 March in Stockholm. She also made her role debut in the title role of Aida in a new production at Zürich Opera and recorded her first album of Richard Strauss's Four Last Songs and final scenes. On the concert platform in 2006–07, she appeared in recital with Antonio Pappano (piano) in Barcelona and Dresden and in recital at the Zürich Opera.

In 2008, Stemme replaced Deborah Voigt in what would have been Voigt's role debut as Brünnhilde in the opera Siegfried, part of a new Vienna State Opera Ring cycle conducted by Franz Welser-Möst. Stemme also sang Brünnhilde in the 2010 season opening at La Scala and in San Francisco Opera's 2011 Ring cycle.

In 2015 Stemme performed at GöteborgsOperan in Gothenburg, Sweden, in a new opera by composer Hans Gefors with libretto by Kerstin Perski and directed by Keith Warner. The opera is based on Alfred Hitchcock's spy thriller Notorious from 1946. Other members of the cast included Katarina Karnéus, John Lundgren and Michael Weinius.

In September and October 2016, Stemme returned to the role of Isolde in the Metropolitan Opera's new production of "Tristan und Isolde". In 2017, Stemme was the soprano soloist at the Last Night of the Proms.

In February 2026 she appeared as Waltraute "providing a veritable masterclass in Wagnerian singing through her commanding vocal presence and stylistic authority" in Götterdämmerung at La Scala, Milan, directed by David McVicar and conducted by Alexander Soddy.

Stemme performs on average 40 times per year in various venues around the world.

== Personal life ==
Stemme lives in Stockholm. She is married to stage designer Bengt Gomér and has three children. She speaks five languages.

== Awards ==
- 1993: winner of Operalia, The World Opera Competition
- 2004: received Svenska Dagbladets Opera Award (Swedish: Svenska Dagbladets operapris)
- 2005: selected by a German expert 50-member jury through the Opernwelt magazine as the world's leading female opera singer
- 2006: appointed Member of the Royal Swedish Academy of Music
- 2006: appointed Hovsångerska by Carl XVI Gustaf of Sweden
- 2008: received the medal Litteris et Artibus by Carl XVI Gustaf of Sweden
- 2010: received the Laurence Olivier Award for Outstanding Achievement in Opera
- 2010: received the Italian award Premio Abbiati
- 2012: selected again by Opernwelt as "Female singer of the year"
- 2012: appointed Austrian Kammersängerin
- 2012: the Gramophone Award for best Opera Record was awarded to DECCA's recording of Beethoven's Fidelio with Stemme performing the role of Leonore with the Lucerne Festival Orchestra directed by Claudio Abbado
- 2013: selected as the world's leading female opera singer by International Opera Awards
- 2014: received the ninth annual Opera News Award "paying tribute to five superb artists who have made invaluable contributions to the art form: director Patrice Chéreau, tenor Juan Diego Flórez, mezzo-soprano Christa Ludwig, bass-baritone James Morris and soprano Nina Stemme"
- 2014: awarded Stockholms Stads Hederspris 2014 (City of Stockholm Honorary Prize 2014)
- 2016: awarded Honorary Doctor's Degree, Lund University, Sweden
- 2016: received the Swedish Jussi Björling Award (Swedish: Jussi Björlingstipendiet)
- 2018: awarded the Birgit Nilsson Prize
- 2022: appointed Bayerische Kammersängerin
- 2023: appointed Ehrenmitglied der Wiener Staatsoper – Honorary member of the Vienna State Opera
- 2023: awarded the San Francisco Opera Medal
- 2025: awarded Commander 1st Class of the Royal Order of Vasa

== Repertoire ==
Stemme's repertoire includes:

Year (debut)	Composer	Opera	Role(s)	Location
2011	Ludwig van Beethoven	Fidelio	Leonore	Royal Opera House
	Alban Berg	Wozzeck	Marie	
	Christoph Willibald Gluck	Orfeo ed Euridice	Euridice	
2015	Hans Gefors	Notorious	Alicia	GöteborgsOperan
	Charles Gounod	Faust	Marie	
	Joseph Haydn	La fedeltà premiata	Diana	
	Leoš Janáček	Jenůfa	Jenůfa	
2022	Leoš Janáček	Jenůfa	Kostelnicka	Theater an der Wien
1999	Bohuslav Martinů	The Greek Passion	Katerina	Bregenzer Festspiele
	Wolfgang Amadeus Mozart	Le nozze di Figaro	Contessa	
	Wolfgang Amadeus Mozart	Die Zauberflöte	Pamina	
1989	Wolfgang Amadeus Mozart	Le nozze di Figaro	Cherubino	Cortona
2011	Giacomo Puccini	La fanciulla del West	Minnie	Royal Swedish Opera
	Giacomo Puccini	La boheme	Mimi	Oper Köln
	Giacomo Puccini	Madama Butterfly	Cio-Cio San	Oper Köln
	Giacomo Puccini	Manon Lescaut	Manon	
1999	Giacomo Puccini	Suor Angelica	Angelica	Oper Köln
	Giacomo Puccini	Tosca	Tosca	
2013	Giacomo Puccini	Turandot	Turandot	Royal Swedish Opera
	Dmitri Shostakovich	Lady Macbeth of the Mtsensk District	Katerina Ismailowa	
	Johann Strauss II	Die Fledermaus	Rosalinde	
2006	Richard Strauss	Arabella	Arabella	GöteborgsOperan
	Richard Strauss	Ariadne auf Naxos	Ariadne	
2019	Richard Strauss	Die Frau ohne Schatten	Die Färberin	Vienna State Opera
2024	Richard Strauss	Die Frau ohne Schatten	Die Amme	Metropolitan Opera
	Richard Strauss	Der Rosenkavalier	Marschallin	
2015	Richard Strauss	Elektra	Elektra	Vienna State Opera
2009	Richard Strauss	Salome	Salome	Gran Teatre del Liceu
	Pyotr Ilyich Tchaikovsky	Eugene Onegin	Tatjana	
2006	Giuseppe Verdi	Aida	Aida	Zürich Opera
	Giuseppe Verdi	La forza del destino	Leonora	
	Giuseppe Verdi	Un ballo in maschera	Amelia	
1994	Richard Wagner	Das Rheingold	Freia	Bayreuth Festival
	Richard Wagner	Der fliegende Holländer	Senta	
	Richard Wagner	Die Meistersinger von Nürnberg	Eva	
1999	Richard Wagner	Lohengrin	Elsa	Theater Basel
2023	Richard Wagner	Lohengrin	Ortrud	Vienna State Opera
	Richard Wagner	Tannhäuser	Elisabeth	
2003	Richard Wagner	Tristan und Isolde	Isolde	Glyndebourne Festival
	Richard Wagner	Die Walküre	Sieglinde	
2008	Richard Wagner	Siegfried	Brünnhilde	Vienna State Opera
2010	Richard Wagner	Die Walküre	Brünnhilde	San Francisco Opera
2011	Richard Wagner	Götterdämmerung	Brünnhilde	San Francisco Opera
	Richard Wagner	Götterdämmerung	Gutrune	
	Carl Maria von Weber	Der Freischütz	Agathe	
	Carl Maria von Weber	Oberon	Rezia	
2017	Richard Wagner	Parsifal	Kundry	Vienna State Opera
2002	Alexander von Zemlinsky	Der König Kandaules	Nyssa	Salzburg Festival
2019	Béla Bartók	A kékszakállú herceg vára	Judith	Royal Stockholm Philharmonic Orchestra

== Discography ==
Stemme's recordings include:

- Isolde in Richard Wagners Tristan und Isolde. (3 CD + 1 DVD). EMI 7243 5 58006 2 6
- Strauss, Richard, Vier letzte Lieder. The final scene from Capriccio. The final scene from Salome. EMI Classics 0946 3 78797 2 6
- Isolde in Wagner's Tristan und Isolde. Glyndebourne festival. Dir. Jiri Belohlavek. Opus Arte DVD OA 0988 D
- Leonore in Beethoven's Fidelio. Dir. Claudio Abbado. Salzburger Festspiele. Decca 478 2551 (box), (478 2552, 478 2553)
- The title role in Janáček's Jenůfa. Dir. Peter Schneider. Live from the Gran Teatre del Liceu, Barcelona, 2005. DVD. Naxos
- Senta in Wagner's Der fliegende Holländer. Dir. David Parry. Chandos 3119 (2 CD). (Opera in English)
- Mortelmans' concert aria Mignon (Kennst du das Land). Zsolt Hamar, conductor; Flemish Radio Orchestra. In Flanders' Fields, vol. 33. Phaedra 92033
- The title role in Verdi's Aida. Züricher Opernhauses. Dir. Ádám Fischer. DVD. BelAir Classics
- The First Plácido Domingo International Voice Competition – Gala Concert. Dir. Eugene Kohn. Sony classical 01-046691-10
- The Marschallin in Strauss Der Rosenkavalier. Chor des Züricher Opernhauses. Nina Stemme, Malin Hartelius m.fl. Zürich. Dir. Franz Welser-Möst. EMI. DVD
- Leonora in Verdi's La forza del destino. Chor und Orchestra der Wiener Staatsoper, dir. Zubin Mehta. Unitel classics (PROFIL 708108). DVD.
- Victoria and She/soprano in Ingvar Lidholm, A Dream Play (Swedish: Ett drömspel) : opera with prelude and two acts. With Håkan Hagegård. Caprice CAP 22029:1–2. (2 CD)
- Isolde in Wagner's Tristan und Isolde. Rundfunk-Sinfonieorchester Berlin, live 2012-03-27. Dir. Marek Janowski. PentatoneClassics PTC 5186404.
- Elisabeth in Wagner's Tannhäuser. Dir. Marek Janowski. PentatoneClassics PTC 5186405
- Minnie in Puccini's La fanciulla del West. DVD. Dir. Pier Giorgio Morandi. Royal Swedish Opera. Euroarts Unitel Classica
- Brünnhilde in Wagner's Die Walküre. Jonas Kaufmann, Anja Kampe, René Pape. Mariinsky Orchestra, dir. Valery Gergiev. MARO527
- Sieglinde in Wagner's Die Walküre. Dir. Franz Welser-Möst. Wiener Staatsoper 2 December 2007. Orfeo C875 131B
- Wagner's Wesendonck Lieder. Swedish Chamber Orchestra. Dir. Thomas Dausgaard. BIS 2022
- Wagner's Wesendonck Lieder; Nystroem's Songs by the sea; De Boeck's Seven French songs. Jozef De Beenhouwer, piano. In Flanders' Fields, vol. 40. Phaedra 92040
- Wagner's Wesendonck Lieder. Salzburg Festival, dir Mariss Jansons. DVD Euroarts.
