= Jeppe: The Cruel Comedy =

Jeppe: The Cruel Comedy is a 2001 opera created and commissioned by librettist-director Claes Fellbom with composer Sven-David Sandström, based on Ludvig Holberg's play, Jeppe of the Hill (Jeppe paa Bjerget eller den forvandlede Bonde), updated to a contemporary setting, with television as a major theme. Its creation was to celebrate the 25th anniversary of Folkoperan, for which Fellbom is managing director. It ran there for more than forty performances. Fellbom translated his libretto into English and directed the first English language production at the Indiana University Bloomington School of Music in February 2003, where Sandström was on the faculty. This production ran four performances (7, 8, 14, 15), which is the standard run of all Indiana University opera productions.

== Cast ==
- Jeppe Verflucht...Michael Weinius

== American premiere ==
The American premiere, translated and directed by Fellbom, was conducted by David Effron and was the 370th production of the Indiana University Opera Theater. It was designed by C. David Higgins with lighting by Michael Schwandt. Original star Michael Weinius performed two of the four evenings, alternating with student Taylor Hightower.

=== Roles ===
- Jeppe Verflucht...Taylor Hightower, Michael Weinius
- Harry Schoenberg...Andrew Hendricks, Jonathan Stinson
- Erik...Nathan Baer
- Josh...Nathan Bick, Joshua Whitener
- La Diva...Teresa S. Herold, Angela Shadwick
- Dolly Verflucht...Lindsey Falduto, Kate Lindsey
- Luna...Sophie Louise Roland, Margaret Nilsson
- Beatrice Schoenberg...Reyna Carguill, Maija Lisa Currie
- Beatrice violin fantasy...Sarah Kapustin
- Chorus...Alison Bacich, Gregory Brookes, Chris Carducci, Grant Clarke, Ulises Dubon, Carelle Flores, Sara Flores, Michael Forbes, Rachel Fulton, Roger Henry, Rachel Olsen, Yoon-Kyung Park, Hanna Penn, Emily Ross-Johnson, Marc Schapman, Jacob Sentgeorge, Scott Six, Samuel Spade, Emily Solt, Maria Rebecca Stoehr

== Synopsis ==
The story deals with a writer named Jeppe Verflucht, whose surname means "cursed" in German, played by a baritone singing primarily in his upper register, who is found drunk on a hill by Erik and Josh, employees of media mogul Harry Schoenberg. Schoenberg had rejected Jeppe's manuscript some twenty years earlier, and now Schoenberg plans to place him in his own reality TV show in which Jeppe believes that he is in Heaven in the 1920s, in which he intends to abuse the writer by having him wake up in Schoenberg's bed next to his wife, Beatrice, a violinist whose relationship with her husband has soured since he forced her to get an abortion, after which she has never played. Beatrice is Fellbom's creation and has no equivalent in Holberg's original. To complicate things even further, Jeppe's wife, Dolly, a bus driver, who has accused Jeppe of being impotent, is having an affair with Erik, who, along with Josh (an accountant), is one of the camera operators on the show. The other principal characters include La Diva, the star of Shoenberg's American Civil War musical, and Luna, Jeppe's bartender, a neo-hippie who claims that her name was given to her by Jimi Hendrix touching her mother's abdomen at Woodstock.

Unlike many operas, the action and visuals often have a severe contrast to the text. In one scene, the text says that Schoenberg is physically hurting Jeppe when in fact, he is not.

Near the end of the opera, Erik dons a cowboy hat and demonically screams at Jeppe in a fashion more akin to rock music than opera. In the American premiere, the role was played by Nathan Baer, the only principal not doubled over the four performances, whose approach to the role in this scene suggested Oingo Boingo's Danny Elfman. Further, rock music is interpolated by Luna and the patrons of her tavern, quoting Janis Joplin's "Oh Lord, won't you buy me a Mercedes-Benz."

Jeppe initially meets Beatrice when she accidentally knocks him over with her bicycle, which she rides in a jogging suit, an unusual example of a woman wearing pants in an opera and still playing a woman. In the original production, the women wore dresses throughout with the exception of this scene.

The opera ultimately ends happily with Jeppe and Beatrice getting together, and Schoenberg publishing Jeppe's novel.
