= Aida (1987 film) =

1987 film

- Directed by: Claes Fellbom
- Written by: Claes Fellbom
- Produced by: Staffan Rydén
- Starring: Margareta Ridderstedt, Niklas Ek, Robert Grundin
- Music by: Giuseppe Verdi
- Release date: 1987
- Running time: 95 minutes
- Languages: Italian, Swedish

Aida is a 1987 Swedish movie, directed by Claes Fellbom. The film is based on Giuseppe Verdi's opera, Aida.

Robert Grundin sings the part of Radamès, and the role is played by dancer Niklas Ek. Marianne Myrsten sings the part of the high priestess, played by Françoise Drapier. Thomas Annmo is the voice of the Messenger, played by Lennart Håkansson. Kerstin Nerbe was responsible for reworking the music. The film is built on a performance at the Stockholm Folk Opera in 1985.

== Cast ==
- Margareta Ridderstedt - Aida
- Niklas Ek - Radames
- Robert Grundin - voice of Radames
- Ingrid Tobiasson - Amneris
- Jan van der Schaaf - Amonasro
- Alf Häggstam - Ramfis
- Staffan Rydén - the King's spokesman
- Françoise Drapier - High priestess
- Marianne Myrsten - voice of the high priestess
- Lennart Håkansson - Messenger
- Thomas Annmo - voice of Messenger
- Heléne Perback - dancer
- Kristin Kåge - dancer
- Ann Lee - dancer
- Annika Listén - dancer
- Saeed Hooshidar - dancer
- Björn Wikström - dancer
- Ross - moderator

== Music ==
- Aida, by composer Giuseppe Verdi
- Italian lyrics by Antonio Ghislanzoni and Swedish lyrics (1880) by Herbert Sundberg.
