= Notorious (opera) =

Notorious is an opera in five acts and 22 scenes by Hans Gefors based on a Swedish-language libretto from Kerstin Perski after Alfred Hitchcock's 1946 film Notorious. The opera premiered at Göteborg Opera in September 2015 with Nina Stemme in the leading role which had been played in the film by fellow Swede Ingrid Bergman. Gefors had previously composed full-length stage works for the Royal Swedish Opera (Christina, 1986), for Wiesbaden Opera (Der Park, 1992), and for the centenary of the Opéra-Comique at the Salle Favart in Paris (Clara, 1998).

== Background ==
The work was commissioned from Gefors in 2009 and permission was sought from Disney / Buena Vista who held the rights to the story. When these were obtained Kerstin Perski (who had worked with Gefors on Vargen kommer (The wolf is coming, for Malmö in 1997) began work on the libretto and Stemme was booked for the leading role.

The opera is set in Brazil and generally follows the scenario of the film faithfully although the script is of necessity much reduced. However the libretto respects traditions of opera with many ariosos, ensembles and choruses apt for singing. The music is characterized by "moments of lushness […], ear-catching polytonalities and extraordinary susurrating tonal clusters for the chorus", along with rhythms and suggestions of the samba woven into Gluckist memories which reflect the partly South American setting.

Among the musical highlights has been noted an aria for Alicia at the end of Act III in which she expresses her doubts about the intrigue before accepting the plan; another for the heroine where she vents her rage "worthy of Isolde" and a scene at a performance of Gluck's Orfeo ed Euridice at the opera house in Rio de Janeiro where Devlin and Alicia sing a duet with chorus.

The opera was broadcast on Sweden's classical radio station P2.

== Roles ==
Role	Voice type	Premiere cast, 19 September 2015 Conductor: Patrik Ringborg
Alicia Hauser	soprano	Nina Stemme
Devlin, a US agent	baritone	John Lundgren
Alex Sebastian	tenor	Michael Weinius
Madame Sebastian, his mother	mezzo-soprano	Katarina Karnéus
Prescott	tenor	Jón Ketilsson
Alicia's father	bass	Anders Lorentzson
Emil Hupka	tenor	Jonas Olofsson
Professor Rossner / Agent 1	tenor	Ingemar Anderson
Man at Alicia's party / Eric Mathis/Agent 2	tenor	Mattias Ermedahl
Dr Anderson / Agent 3	baritone	Mats Persson
Dr Knerr / Agent 4	bass	Mats Almgren
Chorus

== Synopsis ==
The story is an ill-fated love affair with a background of espionage. Set during the Second World War, Alicia Hauser, a free-living daughter of a Nazi, is engaged by American Secret Services to infiltrate a group of émigré German scientists in Brazil who are working on creating a powerful and destructive weapon. Recruited by Devlin with whom she is attracted, she ends up marrying one of the scientists, Alex.
