= Raphaëlle Farman =

French operatic soprano

Raphaëlle Farman (born Paris) is a French operatic soprano.

Farman completed a master's degree in law, and later studied singing at the Conservatoire de Musique in Paris and at the Lyric School of the Opéra Bastille. She graduated in 1992. Since then, she has undertaken various roles on stage or in the concert hall, developing her vocal and artistic personality in such roles as: Michaëla (Carmen), Esclarmonde (Esclarmonde), Violetta (La traviata), Mimi (La bohème), and also in Mozart operas (as Donna Anna, Fiordiligi, and the Countess). She has also sung Viennese Operetta (Rosalinde, The Merry Widow) and performed in many orchestral concerts and given recitals.

In 1998 she sang in the premiere of Clara by Hans Gefors at the Opéra-Comique in Paris (Irène).

More recently she is a co-creator of a comedy show ("Fantasie lyrique") titled: La diva et le Torreador (first presented in Saint-Étienne Esplanade opera house in December 2006).

== Films ==
She has appeared in such movies as La Traviata de Paris (2000) (as Flora Bervoix) and Comedy of Power (2006) (as a professional singer).
