= Carsten Bo Eriksen =

Danish composer and artist

- Born: Carsten Bo Eriksen; 2 October 1973 (age 52); Copenhagen, Denmark
- Genres: Neoclassical, Contemporary Classical, Electronic, Ambient, Experimental Rock, Post-Rock, Post-Punk, Alternative Pop, Darkwave, Shoegaze, Blackgaze
- Occupations: Musician, Composer, Songwriter Record Producer
- Instruments: Piano, Computer, Guitar, Vocal
- Years active: Early 2000s–present
- Labels: DaCapo Records, Naxos, Sony Music / Tame Records. Cosmopol Music Group
- Website: mbd73.com

Carsten Bo Eriksen (born 2 October 1973) is a Danish composer, pianist, guitarist, vocalist, and producer. He works both under his own name and under the artist monikers My Beautiful Decay 1973 and Secretly Dead. His music ranges from neoclassical and electroacoustic works to dark, experimental rock, and he is known for a personal and distinctive sonic signature that blends acoustic and electronic elements.

Eriksen’s music has been streamed many millions of times on streamingplatforms, and in 2025 he received his first gold record for streaming under the name My Beautiful Decay 1973.

== Education and Background ==
Eriksen holds a degree in composition from the Royal Academy of Music as a composer (1997–2003), pupil of Professor Ib Nørholm, Ivar Frounberg and Hans Abrahamsen and he has also studied at Berklee College of Music, Massachusetts, US. He works within contemporary music, electroacoustic music, neoclassical music, and experimental pop, and has distinguished himself with a style that combines melodic clarity, timbral depth, and both pulsating and atmospheric structures. Eriksen has additionally studied the Balinese gamelan music in Ubud, Bali, Indonesia, with the musician Pak Tama. In 2004 he was awarded a three-year working grant from the Danish Arts Foundation.

== Career ==
Eriksen has composed solo works, chamber music, vocal works, orchestral music, and pieces incorporating electronics. He has collaborated with a wide range of Danish and international ensembles and soloists, including cellist Josefine Opsahl, violinist Cæcilie Balling (Denmark), Rudersdal Chamber Players (Denmark), Messiaen Quartet Copenhagen (Denmark), Nordic String Quartet (Denmark), Trio Ismena (Denmark), JACK Quartet, NeoQuartet (Poland), the American Contemporary Music Ensemble (ACME), pianist Rikke Sandberg, and violinist Kirstine Schneider.

As My Beautiful Decay 1973, Eriksen works within a neoclassical and ambient sound aesthetic, focusing on piano, strings, and electronic textures. The project has gained significant international attention, and the music is often described as cinematic, melancholic, and spiritually oriented.

In 2024, Eriksen founded the dark-sounding side project Secretly Dead, where he appears as vocalist, guitarist, and producer. The music draws on melancholic and emotional post-rock, post-punk, shoegaze, darkwave, blackgaze, electronic experimental music, and alternative pop. The project serves as a contrast to My Beautiful Decay 1973 and represents a more raw, expressive facet of his artistic identity.

== Reception and Criticism ==
Eriksen’s music under the name My Beautiful Decay 1973 has been positively received by the music press. Critics have generally highlighted his ability to combine classical sensibilities with modern sound aesthetics, as well as his particular focus on timbral depth, texture, and atmosphere.

In a review in Passive/Aggressive, music critic Nils Bloch-Sørensen described the project as “neoclassical ambient music that beautifully sings of the inevitability of transience.” In 2021, he gained global traction on streaming platforms, something the Danish newspaper Politiken also noted in the article “How Streaming Services Are Changing Classical Music.”

== Musical Style ==
Eriksen’s musical style combines neoclassical structures with electroacoustic layers and atmospheric soundscapes. His works are often characterized by a clear melodic sensibility, transparent harmony, and a particular focus on space and resonance. The music moves between quiet, meditative immersion and more intense, rhythmically driven or texture-rich passages. Through his projects My Beautiful Decay 1973 and Secretly Dead, he works both within a lyrical, minimalist, ambient-oriented universe and within a darker, more experimental rock and electronic sound world.

== Selected Discography ==
=== My Beautiful Decay 1973 ===
- Conversations, Cosmopol Music Group (American Contemporary Music Ensemble) (2025)
- Everything is Lost, Cosmopol Music Group (Trio Ismena) (2024)
- String Quartet No 3, Cosmopol Music Group (Rudersdal Kammersolister) (2024)
- String Quartet No 4, Cosmopol Music Group (Rudersdal Kammersolister) (2023)
- Elements, Cosmopol Music Group (Rudersdal Kammersolister) (2023)
- The Flood, Cosmopol Music Group (Messiaen Quartet Copenhagen) (2022)
- Ulysses, Cosmopol Music Group (Trio Ismena) (2022)

=== Other ===
- Skin, Melonheads Sony music / Tame music (2002)
- Nordlys, DaCapo Records / Naxos (2002)
