= Ordet – en passion =

Ordet – en passion (The Word – a Passion) is a work for soloists, chorus and orchestra in three parts with words from the Bible and by Katarina Frostenson, and music by Sven-David Sandström.

Ordet was first performed on 24 March 2006 at the Berwald Hall in Stockholm, with the Swedish Radio Chorus, Eric Ericson Chamber Choir, and Swedish Radio Symphony Orchestra conducted by Manfred Honeck; the soloists were Nina Stemme, soprano (Marie), Anne Sofie von Otter, mezzo-soprano (Evangelist), Susanne Resmark, mezzo-soprano (Marie-Magdalen), Michael Weinius, tenor (Peter), Johan Reuter, baritone (Pilate), and Sara Andersson, soprano, Ivonne Fuchs, alto, Michael Axelsson, tenor and Linus Börjesson, bass. It was broadcast by the Swedish Radio 2 and relayed by the European Broadcasting Union.

The work lasts around two hours.

== Sources ==
- Broman PF. Ordet – en passion. Introduction to Swedish Radio performance, accessed 4 January 2010
