= Antonio Ghislanzoni =

Italian journalist, poet, and novelist

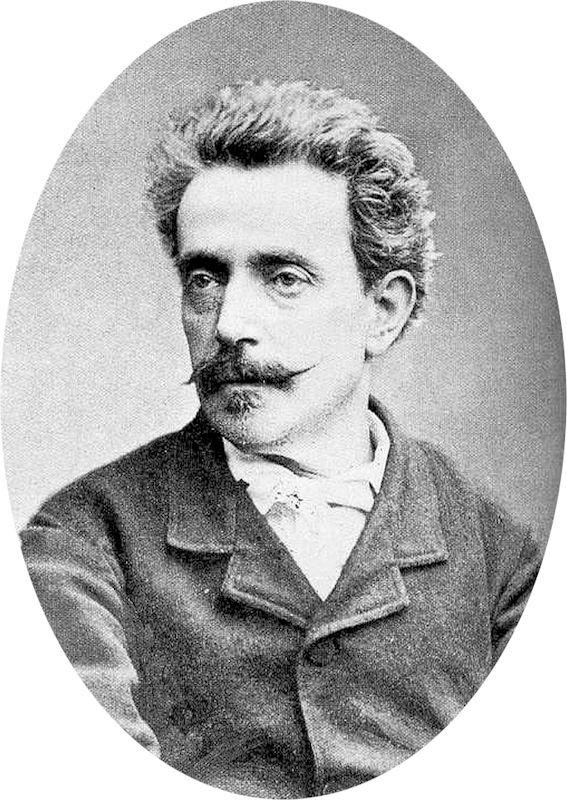
Antonio Ghislanzoni

Antonio Ghislanzoni (Italian pronunciation: [anˈtɔːnjo ɡizlanˈtsoːni]; 25 November 1824 – 16 July 1893) was an Italian journalist, poet, and novelist who wrote librettos for Verdi, among other composers, of which the best known are Aida and the revised version of La forza del destino.

== Life and career ==
Ghislanzoni was born in Lecco, Lombardy, and studied briefly in a seminary, but was expelled for bad conduct in 1841. He then decided to study medicine in Pavia, but abandoned this after a short time to pursue a singing career as a baritone and to cultivate his literary interests.

In 1848, stimulated by the nationalist ideas of Mazzini, Ghislanzoni founded several republican newspapers in Milan but eventually had to take refuge in Switzerland. While travelling to Rome, where he wanted to help defend the nascent republic, Ghislanzoni was arrested by the French and briefly detained in Corsica.

In the mid-1850s, having forsaken the stage, Ghislanzoni became active in journalism in the bohemian circles of Milan, serving as director of Italia musicale and editor of the Gazzetta musicale di Milano. He also founded L'uomo di pietra the magazine Rivista minima, collaborating with, among others, Arrigo Boito.

In 1869, Ghislanzoni retired from journalism and returned to his native Lombardy, where he dedicated himself to literature and writing libretti for operas. He wrote many short stories in verse and diverse novels including Un suicidio a fior d'acqua (1864), Angioli nelle tenebre (1865), La contessa di Karolystria (1883), Abracadabra: Storia dell'avvenire (1884). His novel of theatrical life Gli artisti da teatro, (1865), was republished into the 20th century. He also published musical essays, the most important being Reminiscenze artistiche.

Ghislanzoni wrote some eighty-five libretti, including Edmea for Catalani (1866), Aida (1870), Fosca (1873) and Salvator Rosa (1874) for Gomes, I Lituani for Ponchielli (1874) and the second version of La forza del destino (1869). He also contributed a few verses to the revised translation into Italian of Verdi's Don Carlos.

Ghislanzoni ran a hotel for artists called Il Barco in Caprino Bergamasco, Bergamo, where he died in 1893, at age 68. He was an atheist.

== Librettos by Antonio Ghislanzoni ==
The following table contains a list of opera librettos written by Antonio Ghislanzoni . Ghislanzoni has been attributed with 85 librettos, but the exact number is probably around 40.

Title	Genre	Subdivisions	Music	Première	Place, theatre
Le due fidanzate	Melodramma serio	3 (prologue, 2 acts)	Antonio Baur	25 February 1857	Milan, Teatro Carcano
Il conte di Leicester	Melodramma	4 acts	Antonio Baur	18 February 1858	Parma, Teatro Regio
Maria Tudor	Opera	4 acts	Vladimir Nikitich Kashperov	7 December 1859	Milan, Teatro Carcano
Marion Delorme	Opera seria	3 acts	Giovanni Bottesini	10 January 1862	Palermo, Real Teatro "Vincenzo Bellini"
Cola di Rienzi	Melodramma	4 acts	Vladimir Nikitich Kashperov	March 1863	Florence, Teatro della Pergola
La stella di Toledo	Melodramma	3 acts	Tomaso Benvenuti	23 April 1864	Milan, Teatro della Canobbiana
L'isola degli orsi	Opera buffa	3 acts	Costantino Dall'Argine	14 February 1867	Milan, Teatro di Santa Radegonda
Gli avventurieri	Melodramma	3 (prologue, 2 acts)	Gaetano Braga	30 October 1867	Milan, Teatro di Santa Radegonda
Gli artisti alla fiera	Melodramma buffo	3 acts	Lauro Rossi	7 November 1868	Turin, Teatro Carignano
Giovanna di Napoli (Giovanna II di Napoli)	Dramma lirico	4 (prologue, 3 acts)	Errico Petrella	27 February 1869	Naples, Teatro San Carlo
Valeria	Tragedia lirica	4 acts	Edoardo Vera	16 March 1869	Bologna, Teatro Comunale
I promessi sposi	Melodramma	4 acts	Errico Petrella	1 October 1869	Lecco, Teatro Sociale
Un capriccio di donna	Melodramma serio	4 (prologue, 3 acts)	Antonio Cagnoni	10 March 1870	Genoa, Teatro Carlo Felice
Papà Martin (La gerla di papà Martin)	Opera semiseria	3 acts	Antonio Cagnoni	4 March 1871	Genoa, Teatro Politeama Tivoli
Reginella	Melodramma	4 (prologue, 3 acts)	Gaetano Braga	16 September 1871	Lecco, Teatro Sociale
Aida	Opera	4 acts	Giuseppe Verdi	24 December 1871	Cairo, Khedivial Opera House
Adelinda	Dramma lirico	3 acts	Agostino Mercuri	18 Agust 1872	San Marino, Teatro Concordia
Caligola	Opera	4 (prologue, 3 acts)	Gaetano Braga	22 January 1873	Lisbon, Teatro Nacional de São Carlos
Fosca	Melodramma	4 acts	Antônio Carlos Gomes	16 February 1873	Milan, Teatro alla Scala
Il parlatore eterno	Scherzo comico	1 act	Amilcare Ponchielli	18 October 1873	Lecco, Teatro Sociale
I Lituani	Dramma lirico	4 (prologue, 3 acts)	Amilcare Ponchielli	7 March 1874	Milano, Teatro alla Scala
Salvator Rosa	Dramma lirico	4 acts	Antônio Carlos Gomes	21 March 1874	Genoa, Teatro Carlo Felice
Il duca di Tapigliano	Opera comica	3 (prologue, 2 acts)	Antonio Cagnoni	10 October 1874	Lecco, Teatro Sociale
Sara	Melodramma	4 (prologue, 3 acts)	Luigi Gibelli	27 May 1876	Milan, Teatro Castelli
Gli schiavi di Enna	Melodramma		Nicolò Teresio Ravera	January 1877	London, Queen's Theatre
Atahualpa	Dramma lirico	4 acts	Carlo Enrico Pasta	11 January 1877	Lima, Teatro Principal
Francesca da Rimini	Tragedia lirica	4 acts	Antonio Cagnoni	19 February 1878	Turin, Teatro Regio
Adelina	Melodramma serio	3 acts	Luigi Sozzi	30 September 1879	Lecco, Teatro Sociale
Don Riego	Dramma lirico	4 acts	Cesare Dall'Olio	29 November 1879	Rome, Teatro Argentina
Mora	Opera seria		Luigi Vicini	13 October 1880	Lecco, Teatro Sociale
Giovanna la pazza	Melodramma		Elidoro Ortiz de Zarate	1886	Milan, Conservatorio di Musica
Edmea	Dramma lirico	3 acts	Alfredo Catalani	27 February 1886	Milan, Teatro alla Scala
I Doria	Dramma lirico	4 acts	Augusto Machado	15 January 1887	Lisbon, Teatro de São Carlos
Edoardo Stuart	Melodramma	4 acts	Cipriano Pontoglio	21 May 1887	Milan, Teatro Manzoni
Carmosina	Dramma lirico	3 acts	Julio Gomes de Araújo	1 May 1888	Milan, Teatro Dal Verme
Fiamma	Opera ballo	4 acts	Nicolò Teresio Ravera	26 October 1890	Alessandria, Teatro Civico
Andrea del Sarto	Dramma lirico	3 acts	Vittorio Baravalle	20 November 1890	Turin, Teatro Carignano
Spartaco	Tragedia lirica	4 acts	Pietro Platania	29 March 1891	Naples, Teatro San Carlo
Cleopatra	Dramma lirico	4 acts	Melesio Morales	14 November 1891	Mexico City, Gran Teatro Nacional (Mexico)
Celeste	Idillio musicale	3 acts	Francesco Spetrino	3 December 1891	Bucharest, Teatrul National
Gualtiero Swarten	Opera	3 (prologue, 2 acts)	Andrea Gnaga	15 November 1892	Rome, Teatro Costanzi
Frine od Amore e capriccio	Opera seria	2 acts	Giovanni Carpaneto	7 February 1893	Genoa, Teatro Carlo Felice
Maestro Smania	Operetta	1 act	Cesare Clandestini	12 March 1894	Bergamo, Teatro Riccardi
Alda	Dramma lirico	4 acts	Luigi Romaniello	30 January 1896	Piacenza, Teatro Municipale
I Mori di Valenza (Les maures de Valence) (revised by Annibale Ponchielli and completed by Arturo Cadore)	Dramma lirico	4 acts	Amilcare Ponchielli	17 March 1914	Monte Carlo, Opéra de Monte-Carlo

== Filmography ==
- Aida, directed by Clemente Fracassi (1953)
- Aida, directed by Claes Fellbom (1987)

== See also ==
- Scapigliatura
