= Steven Gadd =

Steven, Stephen or Steve Gadd may refer to:

- Steve Gadd (born 1945), American session drummer
- Stephen Gadd (born 1964), English operatic baritone
- Steve Gadd (born 1952), vocalist of the band Stray
- Steve Gadd, drummer for the UK band Charlie
