= Ahrle =

Ahrle or Ahrlé is a surname. Notable people with the surname include:

- André Ahrlé (born 1961), German racing driver
- Elof Ahrle (1900–1965), Swedish actor
- Leif Ahrle, Swedish actor
