= John Lundgren (baritone) =

Swedish opera singer (born 1968)

- Born: John Otto Lundgren; 12 October 1968 (age 57)
- Occupation: Operatic baritone

John Otto Lundgren (born 12 October 1968) is a Swedish dramatic baritone opera singer.

== Life ==
Educated at Vadstena Academy and in The Opera Academy in Copenhagen. During his studies he joined the ensemble of the Royal Danish Theatre and debuted as Schaunard in Puccini's La Bohème. He appeared there also as Enrico Ashton in Donizetti's Lucia di Lammermoor, Verdi's Posa in Don Carlos and Amonasro in Aida, Wagner's Kurwenal in Tristan und Isolde, and the title role of Der fliegende Holländer, and Puccini's Scarpia in Tosca. He has performed many of these roles internationally and also added to them Carlo Gérard in Giordano's Andrea Chenier at the Bregenzer Festspiele and Jack Rance of La fanciulla del West in Stockholm in the 2011/12 season.

Lundgren has appeared in contemporary opera. In 2005, he performed as Prospero in The Tempest by Thomas Adès and four roles in Reine Jönsson's Cecilia and the Monkey King at Drottningholm Theatre. In 2016 he sang Devlin in the premiere of Notorious (opera based on the Hitchcock movie with the same name) together with Nina Stemme. In 2016 he also expanded his classical dramatic baritone repertoire by singing Wotan in Bayreuth, repeating that part in Stockholm in a single revival of the 2006 staging of Der Ring des Nibelungen directed by Staffan Valdemar Holm. In autumn 2017 John debuted at the Dutch National Opera as Simone in Eine florentinische Tragödie.

In 2018, John participated for the third consecutive year at Bayreuther Festspiele. This time in two roles, Wotan in Die Walküre and the title role of the Flying Dutchman, Der Holländer. Later 2018 he will take part in the production of Wagner's Ring at The Royal Opera House London.

== Awards ==
- In 2006, John Lundgren received the Birgit Nilsson Scholarship for being one of the few Scandinavian-born dramatic baritones of his generation.
- In 2010, Lundgren was honoured Knight of Dannebrog by HM The Queen of Denmark.
- In 2021, Lundgren was honoured Royal Court Singer by His Majesty King Carl XVI Gustaf. https://www.kungahuset.se/kungl.-hovstaterna/kungliga-hederstitlar
- In 2022, John received the Jussi Björling Scholarship.
- In 2023, Lundgren was awarded with the prestigious Lunds Studentsångares Solistpris.https://www.studentsangarna.nu/solistpriset
- In 2023, Lundgren received the Richard Brodin Scholarship. https://operavannerna.com/stipendier/mottagare-av-richard-brodins-stipendium/

== Recordings ==
- Puccini – La fanciulla del West (Royal Swedish Opera House, 2012)
- Handel – Giulio Cesare (Royal Danish Theater, 2007)

== Repertoire ==
Lundgren´s repertoire includes:

Year (debut)	Composer	Opera	Role	Location
	Thomas Adès	The Tempest	Prospero	
2007	Ludwig van Beethoven	Fidelio	Don Pizarro	Den Jyske Opera
	Alban Berg	Wozzeck	Wozzeck	
	Georges Bizet	Carmen	Escamillo	
	Benjamin Britten	Rape of Lucretia	Tarquinius	
	Claude Debussy	Pelléas et Mélisande	Golaud	
	Gaetano Donizetti	Don Pasquale	Malatesta	
	Gaetano Donizetti	Lucia di Lammermoor	Lord Enrico Ashton	
2012	Umberto Giordano	Andrea Chénier	Carlo Gérard	Bregenzer Festspiele
	George Frideric Handel	Giulio Cesare	Curio	
	Reine Jönsson	The Monkey King	Divers	
	Rued Langgaard	Antikrist	The hate	
	Wolfgang Amadeus Mozart	Don Giovanni	Leporello	
	Wolfgang Amadeus Mozart	Così fan tutte	Guglielmo / Don Alfonso	
	Wolfgang Amadeus Mozart	Die Zauberflöte	Sprecher	
	Wolfgang Amadeus Mozart	Le Nozze di Figaro	Conte Almaviva	
2018	Giacomo Puccini	Tosca	Baron Scarpia	Royal Swedish Opera
2011	Giacomo Puccini	La Fanciulla del West	Jack Rance	Royal Swedish Opera
	Gioachino Rossini	Il Signor Bruschino	Gaudenzi	
	Gioachino Rossini	Il Barbiere di Siviglia	Bartolo	
	Gioachino Rossini	Il Viaggio à Reims	Don Profondo	
	Richard Strauss	Capriccio	Haushofmeister	
	Richard Strauss	Elektra	Orest	
	Richard Strauss	Die Frau ohne Schatten	Barak	
2019	Peter Tchaikovsky	Pique Dame	Graf Tomski	Royal Opera House
	Giuseppe Verdi	Il Trovatore	Conte di Luna	
	Giuseppe Verdi	Nabucco	Nabucco	
	Giuseppe Verdi	La Traviata	Giorgio Germont	
	Giuseppe Verdi	Simon Boccanegra	Paolo Albiani	
	Giuseppe Verdi	Don Carlos	Posa	
	Giuseppe Verdi	Aida	Amonasro	
	Giuseppe Verdi	Otello	Jago	
	Giuseppe Verdi	Macbeth	Macbeth	
2016	Richard Wagner	Siegfried	Der Wanderer	Bayreuther Festspiele
2017	Richard Wagner	Siegfried	Wotan	Royal Swedish Opera
	Richard Wagner	Der Fliegende Holländer	Holländer	
	Richard Wagner	Lohengrin	Telramund	
	Richard Wagner	Tristan und Isolde	Kurwenal	
	Richard Wagner	Parsifal	Amfortas	
2018	Richard Wagner	Das Rheingold	Alberich	Bayerischer Staatsoper München
2018	Richard Wagner	Siegfried	Alberich	Bayerischer Staatsoper München
2018	Richard Wagner	Die Walküre	Wotan	Bayreuther Festspiele
2018	Richard Wagner	Der Fliegende Holländer	Der Holländer	Bayreuther Festspiele
2018	Richard Wagner	Das Rheingold	Wotan	Royal Opera House
2018	Richard Wagner	Die Walküre	Wotan	Royal Opera House
2018	Richard Wagner	Siegfried	Der Wanderer	Royal Opera House
2016, 2017	Richard Wagner	Die Walküre	Wotan	Bayreuther Festspiele
	Richard Wagner	Ring des Nibelungen	Alberich	
2017	Alexander von Zemlinsky	Eine florentinische Tragödie	Simone	Dutch National Opera
