= The Shot (film) =

1969 film

- Directed by: Claes Fellbom
- Starring: Peter Schildt
- Release date: 22 September 1969
- Running time: 99 minutes
- Country: Sweden
- Language: Swedish

The Shot (Swedish: Skottet) is a 1969 Swedish thriller film directed by Claes Fellbom.

== Cast ==
- Peter Schildt as Ronny
- Cia Löwgren as Len
- Kent-Arne Dahlgren as Bertil 'Kompis' Johansson
- Solveig Ternström as Len's Mother
- Halvar Björk as Len's Father
- Tord Peterson as Driver (as Tord Pettersson)
- Leif Ahrle as Fixaren
- Harry Ahlin as Old Man
- Hans Strååt as Ronny's Father
