= Staatstheater Kassel =

Theater in Kassel, Germany

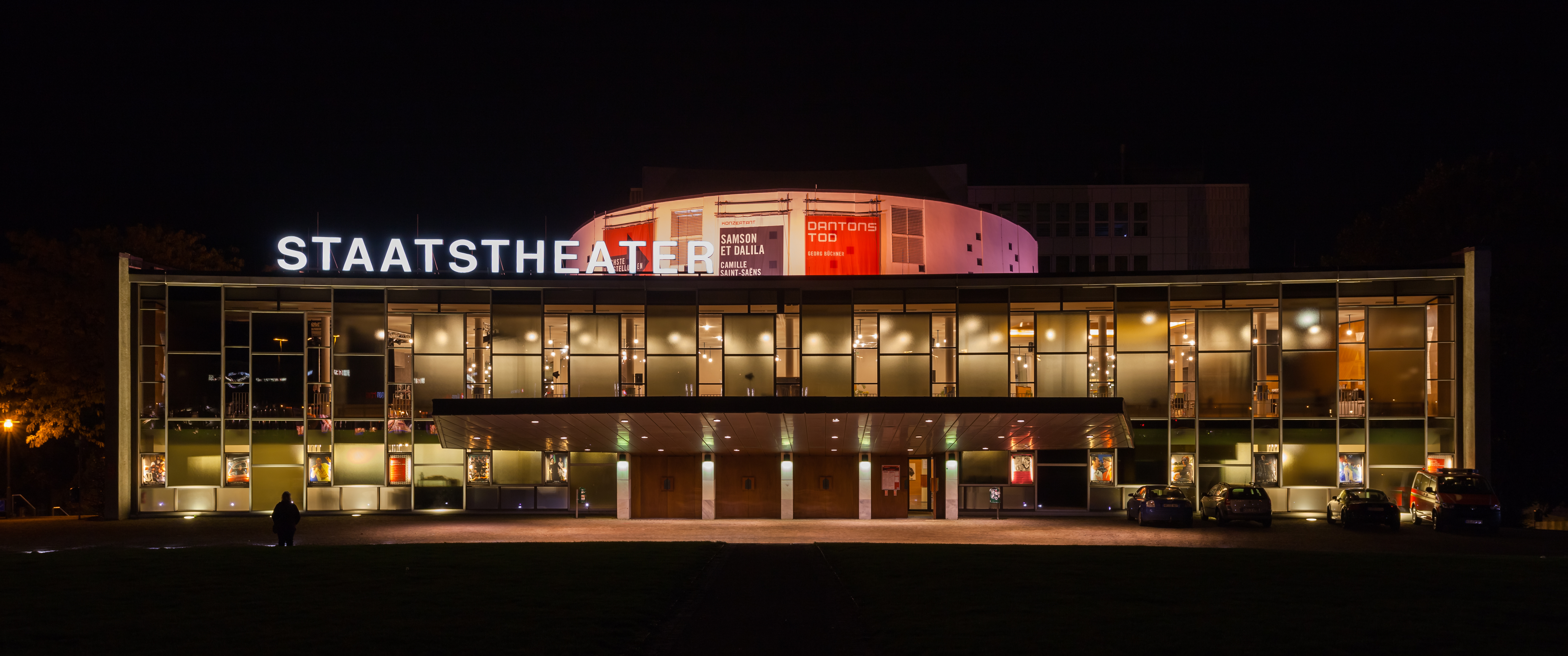
Staatstheater Kassel

The Staatstheater Kassel is a state-owned and operated German theater in Kassel, Germany. The theatre employs around 500 people. The opera house has 953 seats, the Playhouse Theatre 540 seats and the Fridericianum 99 seats. With its total number of 1,592 seats, the theater recorded around 227,000 attendances in the 2008/09 season.

== History ==
A permanent theatre house existed in Kassel during the first decade of the 17th century. It stood immediately next to the Ottoneum near the State Theatre, which is now used as a Natural History Museum and is considered one of the oldest of its kind north of the Alps. Further buildings were constructed for use as public theatre venues, and in the 18th century the opera house was erected on Königsstraße, in which the singer Elisabeth Mara staged her first success and which was conducted by Louis Spohr.

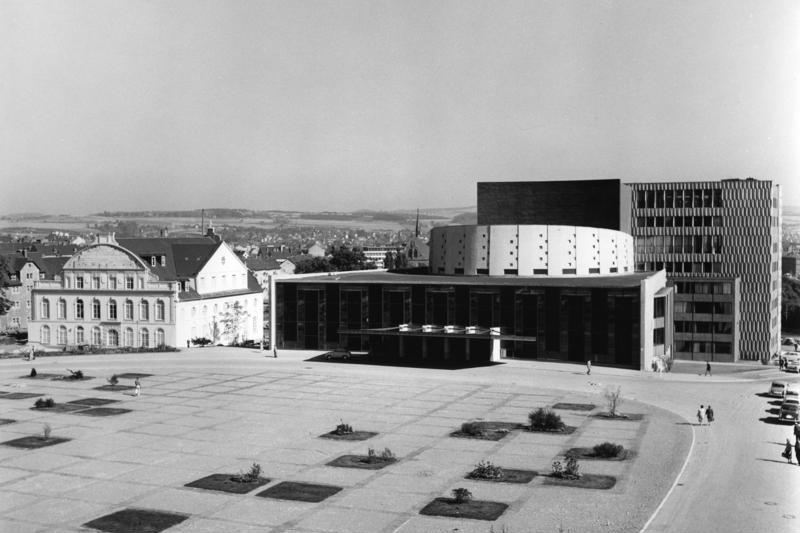

On the orders of Kaiser Wilhelm II, a theatre was built in 1909 possessing one of the largest stages in the country and seating for an audience of over 1,450. The building was heavily damaged during World War II. The architectural competition for a replacement was won by Hans Scharoun but his ideas were not implemented. Instead, the plans of architects Paul Bode and Ernst Brunding were realized. Construction finished in 1959 (the competition models are on display at the Kassel City Museum). In 1989, an additional auditorium with 99 seats, the studio stage TIF – Theater im Fridericianum (Kassel), was erected.

The state theatre's orchestra has one of Germany's longest traditions, having been mentioned as Court Orchestra as early as 1502.

The current Intendant (managing director) of the company is Florian Lutz, since 2021. The current Generalmusikdirektor (General Music Director, GMD) of the company is Francesco Angelico, since 2017. Angelico is scheduled to stand down from the post at the close of the 2024–2025 season. In July 2024, the company announced the appointment of Ainārs Rubiķis as its next GMD, effective with the 2025–2026 season, with an initial contract of three seasons.

== Intendanten (Managing Directors; partial list) ==
- Paul Bekker (1925–1927)
- Franz Ulbrich (1935–1945)
- Manfred Schaffner (1953–1961)
- Günter Skopnik (1962–1966)
- Ulrich Brecht (1966–1972)
- Peter Löffler (1972–1975)
- Peter Mertz (1975–1980)
- Giancarlo del Monaco (1980–1982)
- Manfred Beilharz (1983–1991)
- Michael Leinert (1991–1999)
- Christoph Nix (1999–2004)
- Thomas Bockelmann (2004–2021)
- Florian Lutz (2021–present)

== Hofkapellmeister (Court Conductors) and Generalmusikdirektoren (General Music Directors) (partial list) ==
- Jorg Senger (~1539)
- Johann Heugel (~1570)
- Georg Otto (~1613)
- Michael Hartmann (1651)
- Ruggiero Fedeli (1711)
- Ignatio Fiorillo (1764)
- Jean Baptiste Rochefort (1785)
- Carl Guhr (1814–1821)
- Siegfried Benzon (1821)
- Louis Spohr (1822–1857)
- Karl Reiss (1857–1880)
- Wilhelm Treiber (1880–1899)
- Franz Beier (1899–1914)
- Robert Laugs (1914–1935)
- Robert Heger (1935–1944)
- Richard Holz (1945–1948)
- Karl Elmendorff (1948–1951)
- Paul Schmitz (1951–1963)
- Christoph von Dohnányi (1963–1966)
- Gerd Albrecht (1966–1972)
- James Lockhart (1972–1980)
- Woldemar Nelsson (1980–1987)
- Ádám Fischer (1987–1992)
- Georg Schmöhe (1992–1997)
- Roberto Paternostro (1997–2007)
- Patrik Ringborg (2007–2017)
- Francesco Angelico (2017–present)
