= Sian Edwards =

English conductor

Sian Edwards (born 27 August 1959) is an English conductor, best known as music director of English National Opera in the 1990s.

== Early life ==
Sian Edwards was born in West Chiltington, West Sussex. She studied at Oxford High School, England (and is still remembered by alumnae for her daring streak through her last school assembly) and then the Royal Northern College of Music and later with the conductors Sir Charles Groves, Ilya Musin and Neeme Järvi. She won first prize in the 1984 Leeds International Conducting Competition, on the strength of which she was engaged for concerts with a number of British orchestras.

== Career ==
In 1986, Sian conducted opera for the first time, with Kurt Weill's Mahagonny for Scottish Opera. The following year, she conducted La traviata at Glyndebourne. In 1988 she conducted the world premiere of Mark-Anthony Turnage's opera Greek at the Munich Festival, and followed it with further performances at the 1988 Edinburgh Festival. In the same year she was the first female conductor engaged by the Royal Opera House, Covent Garden, with Tippett's The Knot Garden. She was invited back to conduct Rigoletto, the opening opera of the 1989–90 season

Edwards first appeared at the English National Opera conducting Prokofiev's The Gambler in 1990. In 1993 she succeeded Mark Elder as ENO's music director. She resigned from the post in December 1995, and has since freelanced. Sian Edwards returned to English National Opera for a new production of Orpheus in the Underworld in October 2019. The Grove Dictionary of Music and Musicians lists the orchestras she has conducted: the Los Angeles Philharmonic, the Cleveland Orchestra, the Orchestre de Paris, the St Petersburg Philharmonic and the City of Birmingham Symphony Orchestra. She appeared in the BBC 4 production of 'In the Bleak Midwinter' about the composer Gustav Holst, conducting the Royal College of Music Orchestra. Sian Edwards is performing as guest conductor with the Palestine Youth Orchestra (PYO).

As part of its centenary season, she conducted the world premiere at the Opéra-Comique at the Salle Favart in Paris of Hans Gefors's opera Clara.

Sian Edwards is frequently involved with new music projects; as well as regular performances with the Ensemble Modern, she also appears with the London Sinfonietta, Ensemble Resonanz and Klangforum Wien among others. Sian was appointed Head of Conducting at the Royal Academy of Music (RAM) in London in 2013, where she directs the Masters course and the Sorrell Women's Conducting Programme. In July 2018 the RAM awarded her an Honorary Fellowship. Previously she taught conducting at the Guildhall School, and also gives masterclasses for the Dirigentenforum, Germany, and St Andrews University, Scotland.

== Sources ==
- Flitner, Bettina: Frauen mit Visionen – 48 Europäerinnen (Women with visions – 48 Europeans). With texts by Alice Schwarzer. Munich: Knesebeck, 2004. ISBN 3-89660-211-X, 76–79 p.

== Notes ==
Cultural offices
Preceded by Mark Elder	Music Director, English National Opera; 1993-1995	Succeeded by Paul Daniel
