= Patrik Ringborg =

Swedish conductor

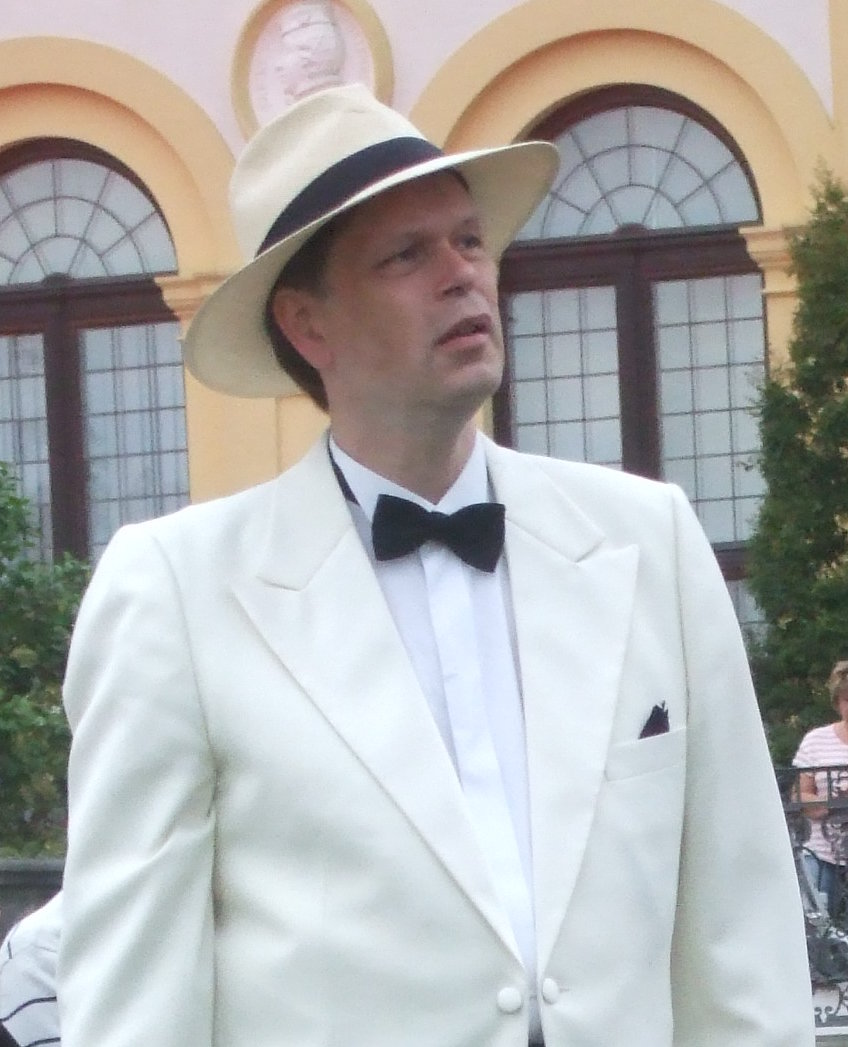

Patrik Ringborg (born 1 November 1965) is a Swedish conductor, member of the Royal Swedish Academy of Music.

== Career ==
Born in Stockholm, as a student Ringborg attended the Adolf Fredrik's Music School in Stockholm. After studies at the Royal College of Music in Stockholm and with Kurt Bendix, Ringborg was a répétiteur at the Royal Swedish Opera in Stockholm from 1989 to 1993, also assisting the music director and conducting performances in the Royal Opera House. He also assisted the music directors at the Semperoper in Dresden (1988) and at the Canadian Opera Company (1992).

From 1993 to 1999, Ringborg worked as staff conductor with the Freiburg Opera, where his position in 1997 was elevated to deputy music director. From 1997 to 2003, he conducted at the Aalto Theatre in Essen, where in 1999 he was appointed principal conductor. After Ringborg's first year in Essen, critics named him the "season's best conductor" together with John Fiore and Essen's music director Stefan Soltesz. Ringborg made his debut at the Gothenburg Opera in 1998 with Tannhäuser, and later was named its principal guest conductor. There he also conducted the much acclaimed world premiere of Notorious by Hans Gefors in 2015. He also was the artistic director of the German Kurt Weill Festival 2000.

Until July 2007, Ringborg was chief conductor with the Freiburg Opera. With the 2007/2008 season, Ringborg became music director at the Staatstheater Kassel, where he also was the artistic director of the "Mahler-Festtage" (celebrated every second year in honour of the late music director in Kassel, Gustav Mahler) until 2017.

Ringborg led the Royal Stockholm Philharmonic Orchestra at the Nobel Prize Award Ceremony 2008, the last opera performances of Dame Kiri Te Kanawa in Cologne (Der Rosenkavalier, 2010), and conducted Elektra with the Stockholm Royal Opera at the Savonlinna Opera Festival in 2010.

As first conductor ever, Patrik Ringborg was awarded the Opera Prize, founded by renowned Swedish newspaper Svenska Dagbladet for the Swedish productions of Das Rheingold and Parsifal.

== Selected opera productions ==
- Salome: Freiburg Theatre (concert), 1997
- Cavalleria rusticana/Pagliacci: Gothenburg Opera, 1999
- Faust: Aalto Theatre, Essen, 2000
- Hänsel und Gretel: Aalto Theatre, Essen, 2000
- Orpheus by Hans Werner Henze: Aalto Theatre, Essen, 2001
- Manon Lescaut: Gothenburg Opera, 2002
- Andrea Chénier: Aalto Theatre, Essen, 2003
- Tristan und Isolde: Gothenburg Opera, 2003
- Die Walküre: Gothenburg Opera, 2004
- Lady Macbeth of the Mtsensk District: Deutsches Nationaltheater Weimar, 2006
- Das Rheingold: Freiburg Theatre, 2006
- Elektra: Freiburg Theatre, 2007
- Peter Grimes: Kassel State Theatre
- Tosca: Deutsches Nationaltheater Weimar, 2008
- Salome: Kassel State Theatre, 2008
- Dialogues des Carmélites: Kassel State Theatre, 2009
- Elektra: Oslo Opera, 2009
- Die Meistersinger von Nürnberg: Kassel State Theatre, 2010
- Der Rosenkavalier: Cologne Opera, 2010
- Lear: Kassel State Theatre, 2010
- Lohengrin: Kassel State Theatre, 2011
- Salome: Gothenburg Opera, 2011
- Lady Macbeth of the Mtsensk District: Kassel State Theatre, 2011
- The Magic Flute: Kassel State Theatre, 2011
- Parsifal: Kassel State Theatre, 2012
- Così fan tutte: Kassel State Theatre, 2012
- Tannhäuser: Kassel State Theatre, 2013
- Parsifal: Royal Opera Stockholm, 2013
- Die Frau ohne Schatten: Kassel State Theatre, 2014
- Der Rosenkavalier: Kassel State Theatre, 2014
- Turandot: Kassel State Theatre, 2015
- Notorious: Gothenburg Opera, World Première 2015
- Die tote Stadt: Kassel State Theatre, 2016
- Elektra: Kassel State Theatre, 2017
- Ariadna auf Naxos: Gothenburg Opera, 2018
- Autumnsonata: Malmö Opera, 2019

== Selected recordings ==
- "Växlar". Stockholms Läns Blåsarsymfoniker. Conductor: Patrik Ringborg. Oeuvres for wind orchester from the 20th century by e.g. Hugo Alfvén, Anders Hillborg and Erland von Koch, Twin Music TMCD-18, 1993.
- "Höga Visan". Sveriges Radios Symfoniorkester, Radiokören. Conductors: Patrik Ringborg, Mats Rondin and Manfred Honeck. Works by Natanael Berg, Phono Suecia PSCD 721, 2003.

== Sources ==
- wagnerspectrum. Werktreue bei Wagner. Der Dirigent Patrik Ringborg im Gespräch mit Egon Voss. Koenigshausen + Neumann Verlag 2005. ISBN 3-8260-3285-3
- Nationalencyklopedin, Supplementband 3. Article "Patrik Ringborg". NE Förlag 1999. ISBN 91-7133-740-7
- Die Walküre by Richard Wagner. Act II, Schott Music 2004. ISMN M-001-12529-1
- Die Walküre by Richard Wagner. Act III, Schott Music 2005. ISMN M-001-12974-9
- A Gallery Carol av Patrik Ringborg. SK Förlag 1985. ISMN M-070-01675-9
- Europa Publications: International Who's Who in Classical Music 2003, 19th edition, Routledge, 2003. 980 p., ISBN 978-1-85743-174-2
- Ruth Renée Reif: Die Stuttgarter Philharmoniker, ein historisches Porträt, Tübingen: Silberburg-Verlag, 1999. ISBN 3-87407-319-X
- Swedish choral music, a selective catalogue, Stockholm: Svensk Musik, 1988, 60 p. ISBN 978-91-85470-49-5

Preceded by Roberto Paternostro	Generalmusikdirektor, Staatstheater Kassel; 2007–present	Succeeded by incumbent
