= Stephen Gadd =

English opera singer

Stephen Gadd

Stephen Gadd (born 1964 in Berkshire, South East England) is an English operatic baritone.

He graduated in Engineering from St. John's College, Cambridge and then studied at the Royal Northern College of Music, under Patrick McGuigan. He was a finalist in Operalia, (Plácido Domingo's international singing competition), and among other numerous awards he won the 1990 Kathleen Ferrier Memorial Scholarship. He has performed the title role in Macbeth at the Glyndebourne Festival, and Conte Almaviva in Le nozze di Figaro for the Salzburger Festspiele.

In 1998 he sang in the premiere of Clara by Hans Gefors at the Opéra-Comique in Paris (Lucio).

== Selected discography ==
- Mozart: Messe C-dur KV 317 »Krönungsmesse«; Exsultate, jubilate KV 165; Vesperae solennes de confessore -The English Concert, Trevor Pinnock (conductor). ARCHIV Produktion.
- Vaughan Williams: Hodie; Fantasia on Christmas Carols -Royal Philharmonic Orchestra, Guildford Choral Society, Hilary Davan Wetton (conductor). Naxos 8.570439.
- Hamish MacCunn: Land of the Mountain & the Flood; The Lay of the Last Minstrel -BBC Scottish Symphony Orchestra, Martyn Brabbins (conductor). Hyperion CDA66815.
- Paul Hindemith: Cardillac -Paris National Opera Orchestra, Kent Nagano (conductor). Bel Air Classiques (DVD) No.23.
- Gustav Mahler: Das Lied von der Erde -Bamberger Symphoniker, Jonathan Nott (conductor). Tudor 7202.
