= Josefine Opsahl =

Classical composer and cellist

- Born: 18 January 1992 (age 34)
- Occupations: Composer, Cellist
- Instrument: Cello
- Years active: 2005-present
- Labels: Dacapo Records, Neue Meister
- Website: josefineopsahl.dk

Josefine Opsahl (born 18 January 1992) is a Danish composer and cellist based in Copenhagen and Berlin.

She writes classical music as a composer and also performs as solo artist with cello and live electronics and live sound design.

== Biography ==
Born in Denmark on 18 January 1992. She studied both classical and contemporary music at the Royal Danish Conservatory and Northwestern University (IL, US) where she completed a Master's degree in cello and later she received a degree as a composer in Contemporary Creative Art at South Danish Conservatory.

As a cellist and performer she has played and released classical music with the groups Kottos and We Like We and as a solo artist the album, Atrium, in 2022.

As a composer she has written three full length operas, ballet music, and numerous symphonic works, among others a cello concerto and symphonic works premiered at the Elbphilharmonie.

== Awards and nominations ==
Josefine has received the 2022 Crown Prince Couple's Stardust Award The 2021 Léonie Sonning Music Prize and the Wilhelm Hansen Foundation's Prize of Honor 2020. In 2024, her opera "Hjem" was nominated for "Opera of the year 2023" by the Reumert Award.

== Selected works ==
- Hands2 (2026) cello concerto commissioned and performed by Copenhagen Phil, Opsahl cello soloist, January 2026,
- Ekko (2025) opera commissioned by Copenhagen Opera Festival, august 2025,
- A Mass of Stars Block the View commissioned by Berlin Academy of American Music, world premiere in Elbphilharmonie, June 2024,
- Passengers of Passing Moments(Koreorama) ballet commissioned by The Royal Danish Ballet, The Royal Danish Theatre, March-April 2024,
- Hjem (2023) opera commissioned by Copenhagen Opera Festival premiere a former prison, Vridsløselille Fængsel, August-September 2023,
- Hands (2023) cello concerto large symphonic orchestra commissioned by Aarhus Sinfonietta for Spot Festival 2023
- DrømmeDøden(2021) opera commissioned by Nordic Opera premiered at The New Opera, Esbjerg Denmark, The Royal Danish Playhouse and Folkoperan in Stockholm (SE), May-June 2022,
- I Walk I Bleed (2020-21) concert and performance for 10 celli commissioned by Click Festival 2020, re-premiere at Theater Black/White (Sort/Hvid),

== Discography ==
- Atrium (2022, Dacapo Records)
- Cytropia (2025, Neue Meister/Berlin Classics)
