= Ingrid Tobiasson =

Swedish mezzo-soprano opera singer (born 1951)

Ingrid Margareta Tobiasson (born February 2, 1951, in Stockholm) is a Swedish mezzo-soprano opera singer. Her principal roles in an extremely versatile career include the title role in Bizet's Carmen and Elisabetta in Donizetti's Maria Stuarda.

== Career ==
Tobiasson attended Adolf Fredrik's Music School (Swedish: Adolf Fredriks Musikklasser), a school in Stockholm known for its song and choral curriculum. She received the Jussi Björling stipend in 2001 and was appointed Hovsångerska by Carl XVI Gustaf of Sweden in 2000.

Tobiasson was employed at the Royal Swedish Opera in 1988, where she has sung numerous roles, including Carmen, a critically acclaimed Elisabetta in Donizetti's Maria Stuarda with guest appearances at the Teatro de la Maestranza in Seville, Omega in The Bacchae by Börtz, Gatekeeper in A Dream Play by Lidholm, Santuzza in Cavalleria rusticana, Ortrud in Lohengrin, Amneris in Aida, Kundry in Parsifal, Azucena in Il trovatore, Mistress Quickly in Falstaff, Klytemnestra in Elektra, Eboli in Don Carlos, and the Countess in The Queen of Spades.

The operatic repertoire also includes roles such as Brigitta in Die tote Stadt, the Hostess in Boris Godunov, Adalgisa in Norma and Fricka in Das Rheingold. In January 1998, she sang Adalgisa at the Deutsche Oper Berlin. Tobiasson has appeared at Malmö Opera and Music Theatre as Amneris in a series of performances of Aida that was also performed in France during the summer of 2001. She has sung Klytemnestra at the Theatre de la Monnaie, the Oper Frankfurt and at the Opéra de Rouen. She is a frequent guest with the leading orchestras in Scandinavia and Finland, and she sings alto and mezzo-soprano parts ranging from Händel's Messiah to Mahler's Symphony of a Thousand and contemporary music.

In 2010 Tobiasson appeared as Magdalena in The Göteborg Opera's Die Meistersinger von Nürnberg and Countess Coigny in Andrea Chénier at the Royal Swedish Opera. In 2011 she sang Filipjevna in Eugene Onegin at Göteborg Opera and Starenka Buryjovka in Janáček's Jenůfa at Malmö Opera. Other commitments at this time were Countess in The Queen of Spades at the Royal Swedish Opera, Mahler's Symphony of a Thousand at the Katarina Church in Stockholm, Beethoven's Symphony No. 9 in the Stockholm Concert Hall, Bianca in Britten's opera The Rape of Lucretia in Vattnäs Concert Barn and La Frugola in a concert performance of Puccini's Il Tabarro in the Berwaldhallen in Stockholm. In the summer of 2013 she returned to Vattnäs Concert Barn for Bianca in The Rape of Lucretia. In 2014 she sang Klytemnästr in Elektra for NorrlandsOperan in Umeå under Rumon Gamba, later released on DVD.

== Discography ==
- Wagner, Wesendonck Lieder; Mahler: Kindertotenlieder; Weinberger: Chestnut Tree, Sixten Ehrling, dir., Royal Swedish Opera Orchestra, 2001, Caprice : CAP 21661.
- The most beloved opera choruses, 1996, Caprice : CAP 21520
- Opera gala, 1996, Bluebell : ABCD 065
- Embrio, 2003, Phono Suecia : PSCD 141
- En galakväll på operan, 1999, Klassiska musikstunder : KM 036; SEP 6201 20 036
- A dream play : opera in a prelude and two acts / Ingvar Lidholm, Kjell Ingebretsen, dir., Stockholm Royal Choir, Stockholm Royal Orchestra, Hillevi Martinpelto, et al., 1993, Caprice : CAP 22029:1-2
- Die tote Stadt / Erich Wolfgang Korngold, Thomas Sunnegård, Katarina Dalayman. (Live recording from the Royal Swedish Opera 1996), 1997, Naxos : 8.660060-1
- Tirfing / Wilhelm Stenhammar, 1999, extract, Sterling : CDO-1033-2
- Ur Mässa i h-moll / J S Bach, 1995, Nosag : CD 012
- Juloratorium. del 1-3 / J.S. Bach, 1999, NKMC 1
- Vandring / music: Jan Wallgren
- Don Carlos / Verdi, Peter Mattei, Bengt Rundgren, Martti Wallén, Jaakko Ryhänen, 2003, Naxos : 8.660096, 8.660097, 8.660098
- Operakörer / Wagner, 2003, Naxos : 8.557326-27 S
- Börtz, Backanterna, Kjell Ingebretsen, dir., Stockholm Royal Opera Chorus, Stockholm Royal Orchestra, Sylvia Lindenstrand, Berit Lindholm, et al., sound tracks from the movie, Caprice CAP 22028:1-2

== Filmography ==
- Encounters in the Twilight (1957)
- Aida (1987)
- Backanterna (1993)
