= Leif Ahrle =

Swedish actor

- Born: 10 June 1943 (age 82); Stockholm, Sweden
- Occupation: Actor
- Years active: 1965-present

Leif Ahrle (born 10 June 1943) is a Swedish actor. He has appeared in more than 35 films and television shows since 1965.

== Selected filmography ==
- The Shot (1969)
- The White Wall (1975)
- Sally and Freedom (1981)
