= Jonathan Stinson =

American singer and composer of opera

Jonathan Stinson is an American singer and composer of opera. Stinson is currently a voice professor and the Director of Opera at the University of Arkansas.

== Education ==
Stinson is a graduate of the Oberlin Conservatory of Music (2001), and Indiana University School of Music (2004), and University of Cincinnati - College-Conservatory of Music (2016).

== Singing career ==
Stinson has performed with opera companies and festivals throughout the United States, including Cincinnati Opera, Lyric Opera of Kansas City, Opera Omaha, Dayton Opera, Delaware Valley Opera, Kentucky Opera, Opera Memphis, Opera New Jersey, Cleveland Opera, Central City Opera, Ohio Light Opera, and the Carmel Bach Festival. Stinson was previously a professor of voice at the Crane School of Music at State University of New York at Potsdam. He now teaches at the University of Arkansas as the Director of Opera.

== Composing career ==
Stinson's song cycles have been performed in Indiana, Ohio, Massachusetts, Tennessee, Missouri, and Wisconsin. His first children's opera, The Three Bears, was commissioned by Opera Memphis and premiered in 2007. In 2011, Stinson's second children's opera, Knightly News, premiered in Chicago by the Chicago Opera Playhouse. During the 2012–2013 season, Atlanta Opera toured Knightly News throughout northern Georgia for 11 weeks. In 2023, Stinson debuted his monodramatic song cycle Uncivil Relief in Virginia.
