= Clara (opera) =

Opera by Hans Gefors

Clara is an opera in two acts and 18 tableaux by Hans Gefors based on a French-language libretto by Jean-Claude Carrière. The opera premiered at the Opéra-Comique at the Salle Favart in Paris on 7 December 1998. This was Gefors' fifth opera; he had previously composed full-length stage works for the Royal Swedish Opera (Christina, 1986) and for Wiesbaden Opera (Der Park, 1992).

== Background ==
The work was commissioned from Gefors in 1995 and the composer and librettist met in Paris that year. Having received the first drafts of the text the following year, Gefors began composition in April 1997. The opera is written for traditional acoustic orchestral forces plus some electronic instruments. For the premiere production, the director was Günter Krämer with sets and costumes by Gottfried Pilz; lighting was designed by Fabrice Kebour.

The opera was later performed in the same production at the Stadt Theater in Bern on 3 November 2000. It was mounted at the Royal Swedish Opera on 12 May 2001 (in Swedish) with Susann Végh in the title role and Werner Seitzer conducting. The production was recommended to be viewed by adults only. Two performances took place in Gothenburg the following May.

== Roles ==
Role	Voice type	Premiere cast, 7 December 1998 Conductor: Sian Edwards
Clara	mezzo-soprano	Marie-Ange Todorovitch
Irène	soprano	Raphaëlle Farman
Amélia (mother of Clara)	soprano	Ghyslaine Raphanel
Adriana	mezzo-soprano	Alexandra Papadjiakou
Pascal (brother of Clara)	tenor	Nikolai Schukoff
Lucio	baritone	Stephen Gadd
L'Inspecteur	baritone	François Harismendy
Faustin (father of Clara)	bass-baritone	Christophe Fel
Le Docteur	tenor	Ivan Matiakh
Voice off-stage	tenor	Scott Emerson
Le Chauffeur	baritone	Olivier Heyte
Le Prêtre	bass	Emidio Guidotti
La Domestique	mezzo-soprano	Karine Ohanyan
Le Journaliste	bass	Wilfried Bosch-Alfonsi
Le Double de Faustin	bass	Pascal Sogny
Chorus

== Synopsis ==
The first scene, set in a big coastal house on the Côte d'Azur, ends with the murder of Clara's father. At the funeral a police inspector implies that the family's wealth came from her father's connection to organized crime. Clara is determined to discover why her father was murdered, and leaves the family home in search of information.

Her travel brings her to red-light areas, where, as well as the doctor and Pascal, she meets a client, Lucio. At a gambling den she sees a ghostly apparition of Faustin, while Irène and Adriana warn her that Lucio is dangerous; however she goes off with Lucio. Amélia arrives at the den hallucinating and not recognizing her daughter.

Back at the family house the contents are being sold by Pascal. Lucio arrives and is recognized by Amélia. Lucio tells Clara how her childhood comforts were paid for – by death and narcotics. Pascal threatens his sister, but the confrontation ends with his death and that of Lucio.

By the end of the opera Clara has discovered who the person was she must accept as her father, but learns more about herself as she leaves to restart her life.
