= Folkoperan =

Opera house in Stockholm, Sweden

Coordinates: 59°19′07″N 18°03′30″E

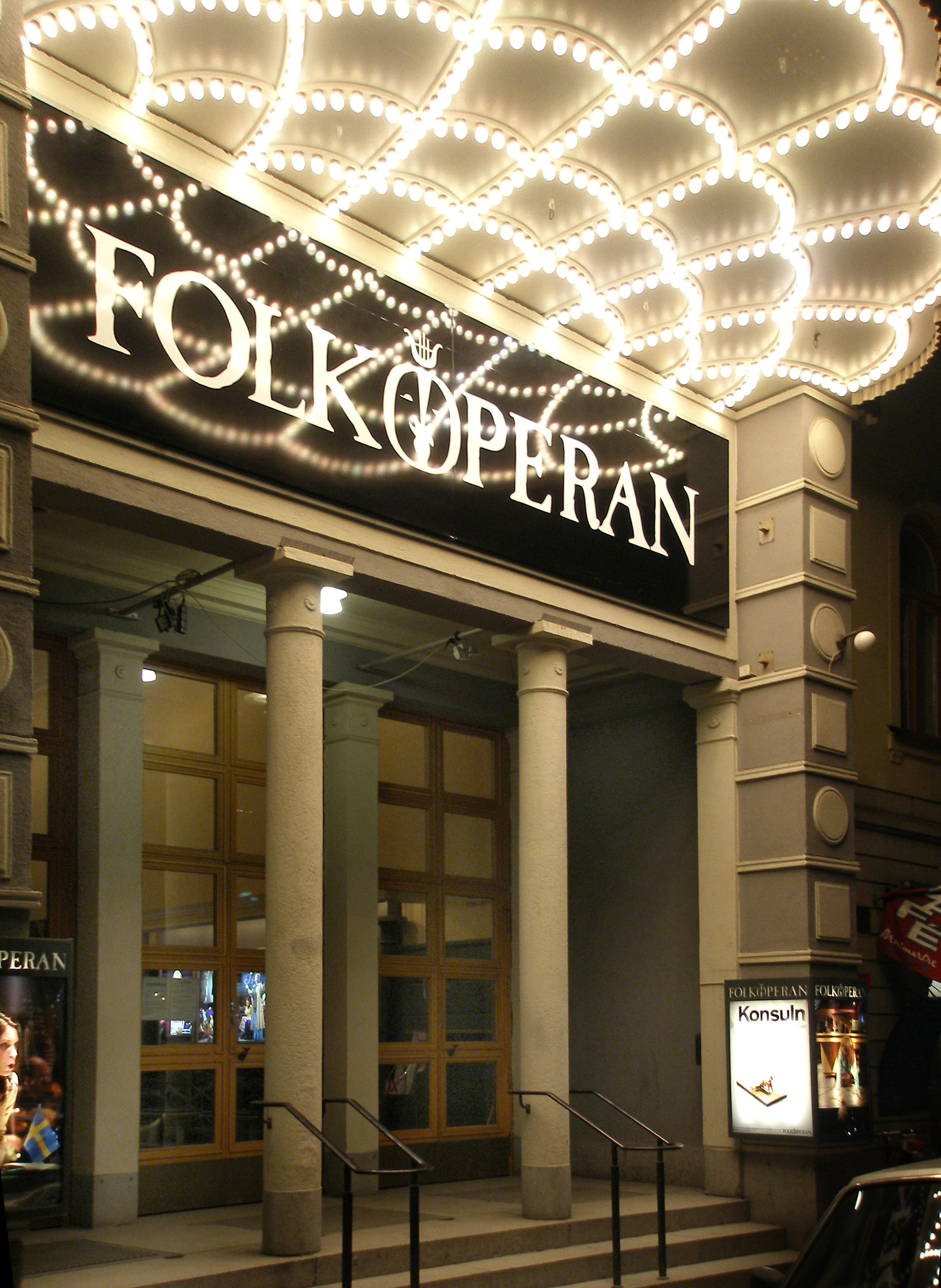
Folkoperan

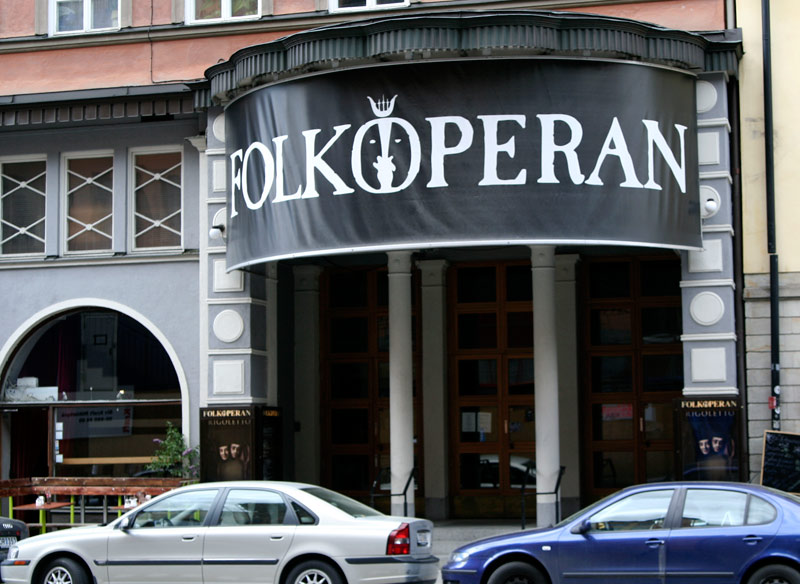
Folkoperan

Folkoperan is an opera house in Stockholm, Sweden, at Hornsgatan 72 in the southern district of Södermalm. It is one of Stockholm's most successful opera houses in terms of audience attendance, and is considered Sweden's most important stage for freelance opera singers and musicians.

== History ==
Folkoperan was founded in 1976 by Claes Fellbom, Kerstin Nerbe, and Krister Fagerströmin. The opera house is located in a building which was designed by architect Höög & Morssing in elegant 1920s Nordic Classicism. It was first erected by the cinema owner and builder John A. Bergendahl (1872–1958) at the site of the former Maria saluhall. At that time it was one of Stockholm's largest cinemas with 1,002 seats.

As a theatre institute, Folkoperan receives annual funding from the Swedish Arts Council, the Stockholm County Council, and the City of Stockholm. Over the years, Folkoperan has functioned as an antithesis to the Royal Swedish Opera in Stockholm. It has become much appreciated by the Swedish opera audience due to its unconventional productions and smaller, more intimate stage. Folkoperan celebrated its 25th anniversary with the new opera, Jeppe: The Cruel Comedy, written and directed by Claes Fellbom and composed by Sven-David Sandström (1942–2019).

== Other sources ==
- Fellbom, Claes (2012) Född ur passion: Folkoperan, som jag såg den (Stockholm: Carlsson) ISBN 978-91-7331-523-4
- Berglund, Kurt (1993) Stockholms alla biografer: ett stycke Stockholmshistoria från 90-tal till 90-tal (Stockholm: Svenska turistföreningen) ISBN 91-7156-113-7
