= Claes Fellbom =

Swedish film director (1943–2024)

Claes Fellbom (29 January 1943 – 19 April 2024) was a Swedish film director, screenwriter, and composer, and a librettist and opera stage director. He was the founder and managing director of the company Folkoperan, which he led for 36 years.

In 1989, he started his international career and after that he had at least one premiere per year. He also wrote libretti to nine operas, including Marie Antoinette, Zarah and JEPPE, as well as penning several books.

Fellbom collaborated with composer Sven-David Sandström on Jeppe: The Cruel Comedy (2001), and made a notorious film of Giuseppe Verdi's Aida, with Folkoperan in 1987, which was performed topless. He also wrote the libretti for Daniel Börtz's Marie Antoinette (1998) and Svall (2005) and Qu Xiaosong's Oedipus.

== Death ==
Fellbom died on 19 April 2024, at the age of 81.

== Filmography ==
- Aida (1987) (director, screen adaptation)
- Carmen (1983) (director, Swedish translation)
- Skottet (The Shot) (1969) (director, co-writer, co-composer)
- Agent 0,5 och Kvarten - fattaruväl! (1968) (director only)
- Carmilla (1969) (director, screenwriter, composer)
- Ska' ru' me' på fest? (1966) (director, screenwriter, composer)
