= Michael Weinius =

Swedish operatic tenor (born 1971)

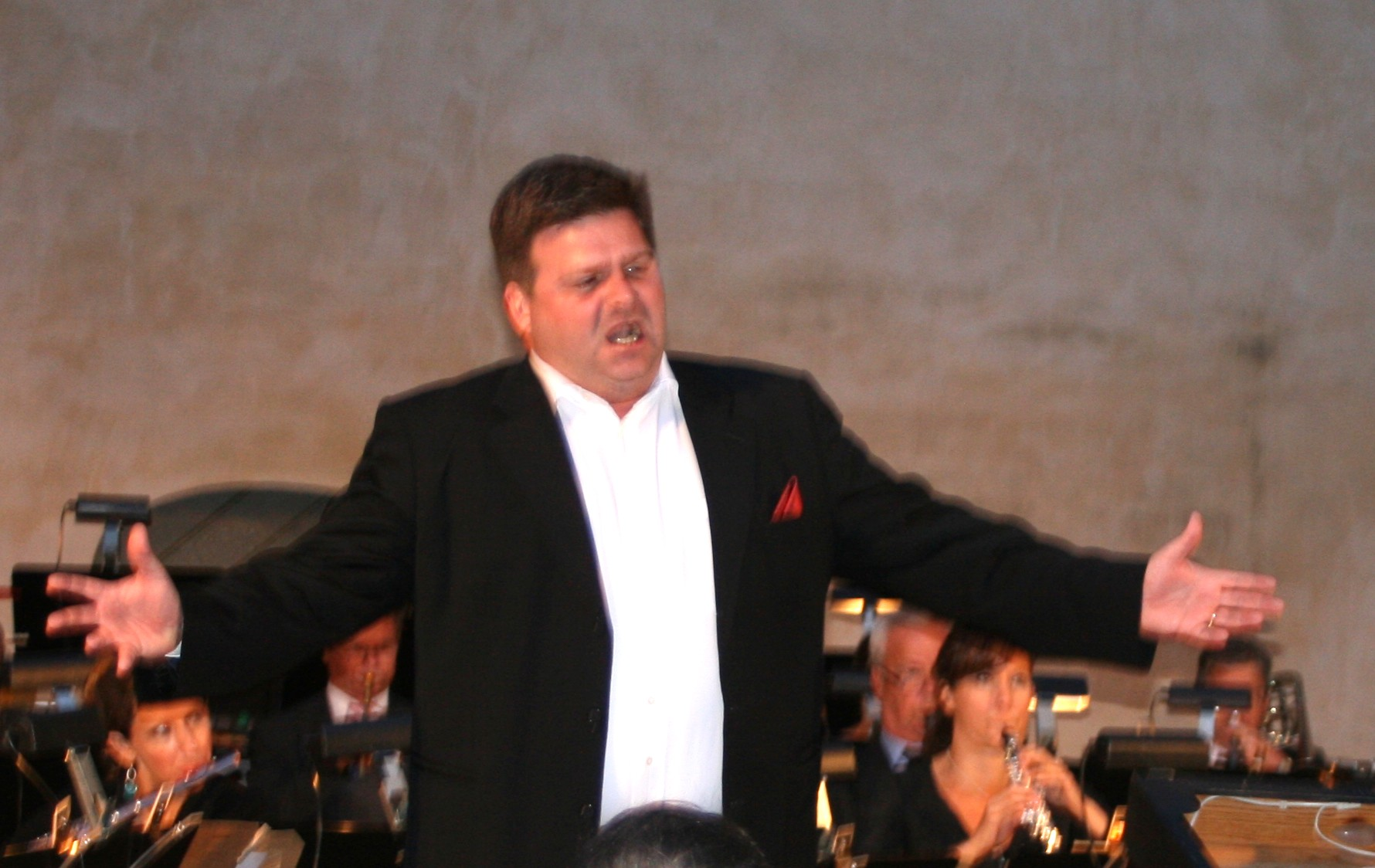
Weinius at the Östergötland music days in 2009

Michael Weinius (born 1 March 1971 in Stockholm) is a Swedish operatic tenor. After winning first prize at the 2008 international Wagner competition in Seattle, Weinius has quickly established himself as one of Europe's most sought after tenors.

== Education and early years ==
Weinius received his first musical training at the Adolf Fredrik's Music School in Stockholm and then studied at the University College of Opera in Stockholm, receiving his exam in 1995. He made his international debut as a baritone in the role of Guglielmo in Così fan tutte and quickly became a regular guest at the Swedish opera houses in roles such as Renato/Greve Holberg in Un ballo in maschera, Posa in Don Carlos and Marcello in La bohème.

== Swedish career ==
In 2004 Weinius switched his fach to tenor and made his debut in the role of Laca (Jenůfa) at NorrlandsOperan in Umeå. During his first year as a tenor he was engaged to sing Don José (Carmen) in concert with the Royal Stockholm Philharmonic Orchestra under Marc Soustrot, Loge (Das Rheingold) in concert with the Gothenburg Symphony Orchestra and Kent Nagano, and Sergej (Lady Macbeth of the Mtsensk District) at the Värmland Opera in Karlstad, Sweden. These initial triumphs as a tenor led to a row of role debuts, such as Riccardo/Gustav III (Un ballo in maschera), Dick Johnson (La fanciulla del West) and Herod (Salome), Turiddu (Cavalleria rusticana) and Siegmund (Die Walküre), Cavaradossi (Tosca), Don José again and the title role in Otello.

In early 2007 Weinius sang his first Parsifal in Karlstad Cathedral when the Värmland Opera presented its acclaimed production. Thereafter Weinius established himself as a sought after interpreter of this role. He sang Parsifal in Mannheim in the spring of 2008, secured his victory in the international Wagner competition in Seattle in 2008 by singing excerpts from Parsifal, and has since performed it on a number of international stages including Deutsche Oper am Rhein in Düsseldorf and the Finnish National Opera in Helsinki.

In December 2008 Weinius participated in the first performance of Batseba by Sven-David Sandström, commissioned by the Royal Swedish Opera in Stockholm, in the role of King David written especially with Weinius in mind. Other recent performances in Sweden include the title role in Peter Grimes, Alfred (Die Fledermaus), the kings Charles IV and Ferdinand VII in Daniel Börtz' opera Goya, the title role in Verdi's Otello and Siegmund in Die Walküre.

In autumn 2010 Weinius made his debut at the Opéra Bastille in Paris in the role of Hans Schwalb in Hindemith's Mathis der Maler under the conductor Christoph Eschenbach. In the spring of 2012 he sang for the first time the title role in Wagner's Lohengrin at the Royal Swedish Opera in Stockholm. In September 2015 he sang in the premiere of Notorious at the Göteborg Opera.

== International career ==
In 2013 Weinius has made his debut at i.a. the Deutsche Oper Berlin in the title role in Lohengrin and at the Bavarian State Opera in the title role in Parsifal. He participate in a Wagner gala with the Staatskapelle Dresden under director Christian Thielemann. Weinius is also heavily engaged as concert singer and has performed under directors such as Gustavo Dudamel, Alan Gilbert, Leif Segerstam, Jukka-Pekka Saraste, Kent Nagano, Pinchas Steinberg, Pier Giorgio Morandi and Marc Soustrot.

== Awards ==
- 2004: received the Gösta Winbergh Award
- 2006: received the Birgit Nilsson stipend (Swedish: Birgit Nilsson's stipendium)
- 2009: received the Svenska Dagbladet Opera Prize (Swedish: Svenska Dagbladets Operapris)
- 2009: received the Opera Magazine Prize (Swedish: Tidskriften Operas pris)
- 2012: received the Jussi Björling stipend (Swedish: Jussi Björling-stipendiet)
- 2013: received the soloist prize conferred by Lunds Studentsångförening
- 2013: appointed Hovsångare by H.M. the King of Sweden
