= Sven-David Sandström =

Swedish composer (1942–2019)

- Born: 30 October 1942; Motala, Sweden
- Died: 10 June 2019 (aged 76); Högalids district in Stockholm
- Era: 20th–21st centuries

Sven-David Sandström (30 October 1942 – 10 June 2019) was a Swedish classical composer of operas, oratorios, ballets, and choral works, as well as orchestral works.

== Life and career ==
Sandström was born in Motala and studied art history and musicology at Stockholm University. He also studied musical composition at the Royal College of Music, Stockholm.

He was a faculty member at the Royal College of Music, Stockholm, and Indiana University Bloomington's Jacobs School of Music, where he taught for fifteen years. He died in the Högalids district of Stockholm.

Among his works are The High Mass, a Requiem, concertos for flute, guitar, piano, and cello, and the 2001 opera, Jeppe: The Cruel Comedy on a libretto and originally directed by Claes Fellbom, who commissioned the work for the centennial of the Swedish opera company. Fellbom translated the opera into English and directed its first production in that language at Indiana University in February 2003. In 2006, Sandström's Ordet - en passion was performed on 24 March in Stockholm. A number of his works were inspired by significant choral works by Bach and other composers, but reinterpreted in Sandström's very personal style. These include a set of the six Bach cantata texts in Bach's structure (double choir plus four-part chorale), a reinterpretation of the text of Handel's Messiah commissioned and premiered by the Oregon Bach Festival in 2009 and also performed at the Rheingau Musik Festival that year, and works by Purcell.

His work draws on ideas from modernist music, minimalist music, jazz, and popular music. Indeed, in Act II of Jeppe, the chorus sings the line "O Lord, Won't You Buy Me a Mercedes-Benz" in harmony based on the original Janis Joplin melody. He also incorporated elements of Tejano music in his work.

Sandström wrote film scores for Äntligen! (1984), and for the television films Facklorna (1991), Lars Norén's Ett Sorts Hades (1996), and Gertrud (1999).

== Featured students ==
- Marie Samuelsson
