= Hans Gefors =

Swedish composer

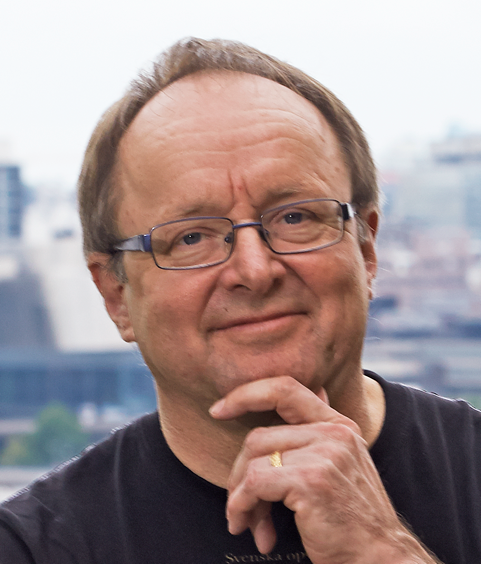

Hans Gefors (born 8 December 1952) is a Swedish composer. He was born in Stockholm and has lived in Lund since the mid-1990s.

== Selected works ==
- La boîte chinoise, for guitar (1975)
- Poeten och glasmästaren, chamber opera (1979, libretto: Lars Forssell after Baudelaire)
- Slits for orchestra (1981)
- Christina, opera in two acts (1982–86, libretto: Lars Forssell och Hans Gefors)
- Whales weep not!, a cappella chorus (1987, D. H. Lawrence)
- Twine (Music no 3) for orchestra (1988)
- En obol, song-cycle (1989, Lars Forssell)
- Der Park, opera in three acts (1986–91, libretto: Botho Strauss och Hans Gefors)
- Vargen kommer, opera in three acts (1994–96, libretto: Kerstin Perski
- Lydias sånger, song-cycle for mezzo-soprano and orchestra (1995-96 from the poem of Hjalmar Söderberg Den allvarsamma leken)
- Clara, opera in two acts (1997–98, libretto: Jean-Claude Carrière)
- Kabaretsånger (2001, Jonas Gardell)
- Njutningen (La Jouissance) (Music no 7), song-cycle in five parts (2002)
- Skuggspel, opera in one act (2003–04, libretto: Maria Sundqvist)
- Själens rening genom lek och skoj, car-radio opera (2005–09, libretto: Hans Gefors after Erlend Loe)
- Umi sono mono for choir, electric guitar and percussion (2011, Yukio Mishima)
- Notorious, opera in five acts (2012–14, libretto: Kerstin Perski)
- Modstand mod renhed, three songs to poems by Inger Christensen (2015–16)
- Det store andletet, five songs to poems of Jon Fosse (2015–16)
