= Edsviks konsthall =

Coordinates: 59°26′26″N 17°57′32″E

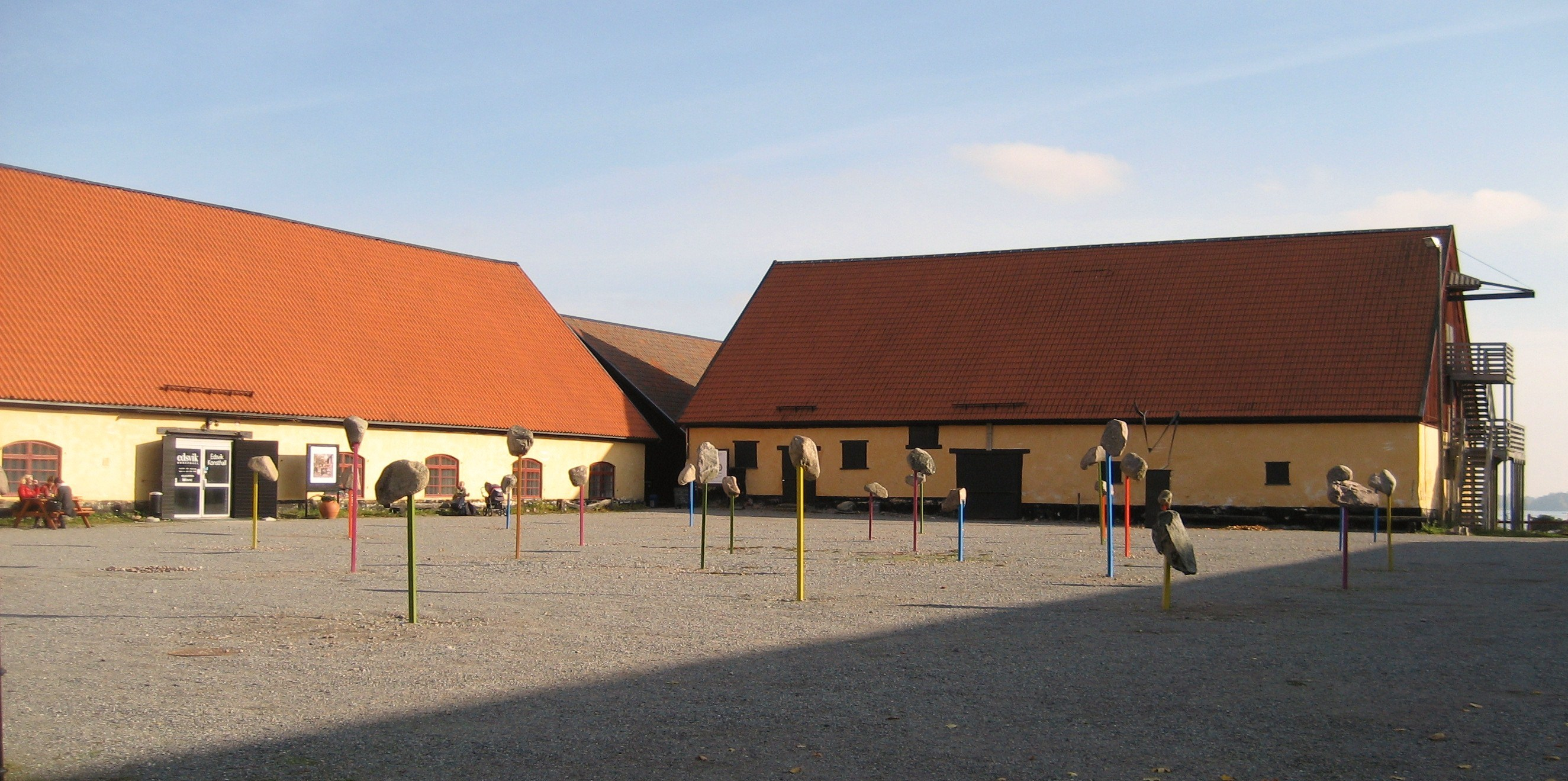
Edsvik Konsthall

Edsviks konsthall (Edsvik Art Gallery) was a Swedish art gallery situated at Edsberg, an 18th-century estate at Edsviken in the north of Stockholm, Sweden. The gallery focused on Swedish and international contemporary art. Some 15–20 exhibitions of Swedish and international artists were held at the gallery each year. Edsviks konsthall was the second largest art gallery in Sweden. The art gallery consisted of two main buildings; gallery east and gallery west. The director, Ricardo Donoso, was hired by Sollentuna Municipality in 2004.

== History ==
The ambition of running an art gallery started with the artist group Konstnärsgruppen which was established 1985 by a group of artists living in Sollentuna. In 1986 the society Friends of Stallbacken (Stallbackens vänner) was established for the purpose of building a community center in Sollentuna which was named Duvslaget. In 1994 the group presented an outline to Sollentuna municipality for their project Konsthall Stallbacken. The ambition was to create a meeting place for artists, trade and industry as well as the public, both for the municipality of Sollentuna and the rest of Stockholm. Edsvik Konsthall was founded in May 1996 and is located at Stallbacken next to Edsberg in Sollentuna municipality. The buildings at Stallbacken consist of stable and barn buildings which originally belonged to Edsbergs. The castle and stallbacken have been owned by Sollentuna municipality since the 1970s.

In 2019, it closed.

== Directors ==
- Maria Fridh 1996-2002
- Stefie Goudaki 2002-2003
- Ricardo Donoso 2004-

== Gallery ==
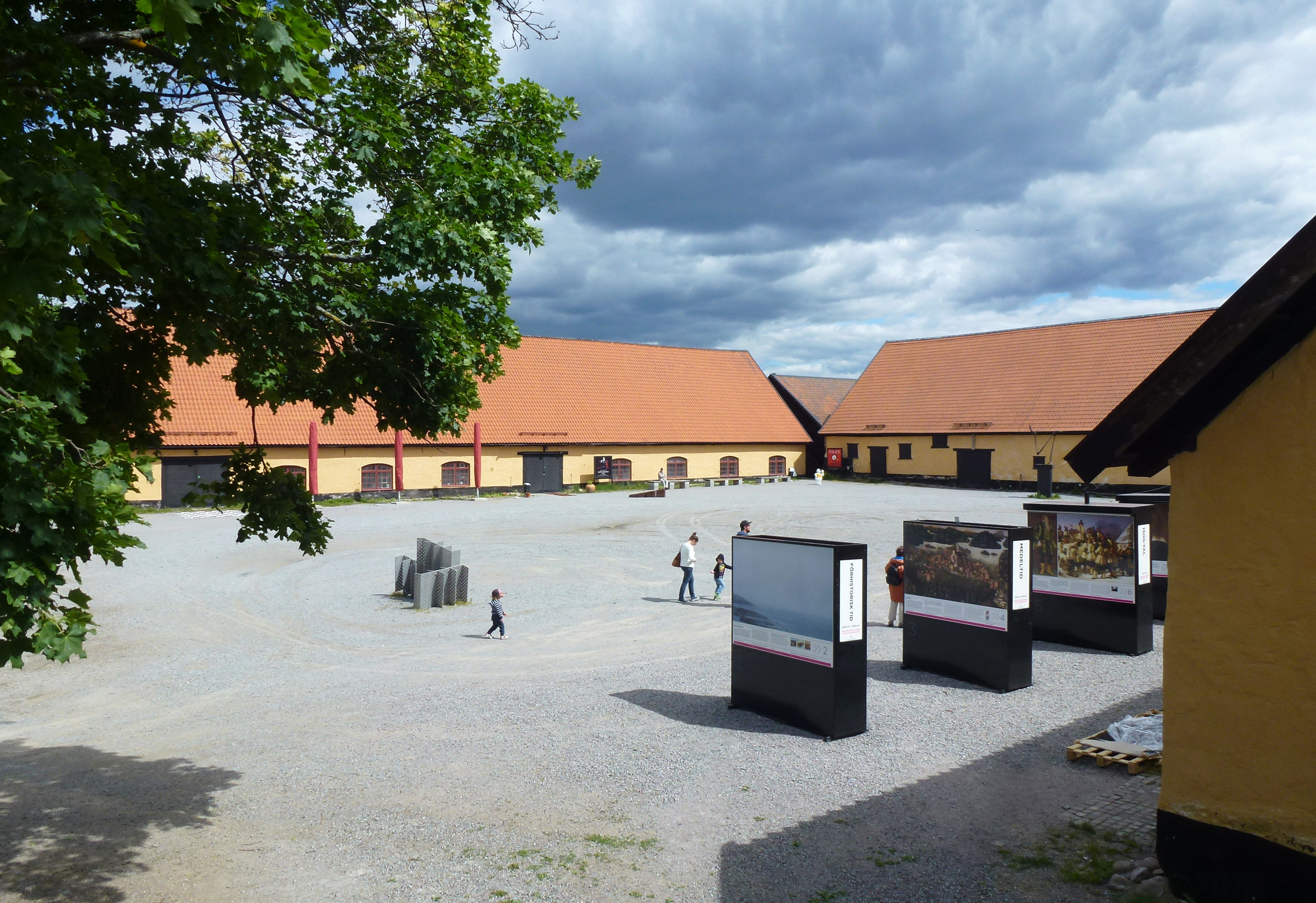
Stallbacken

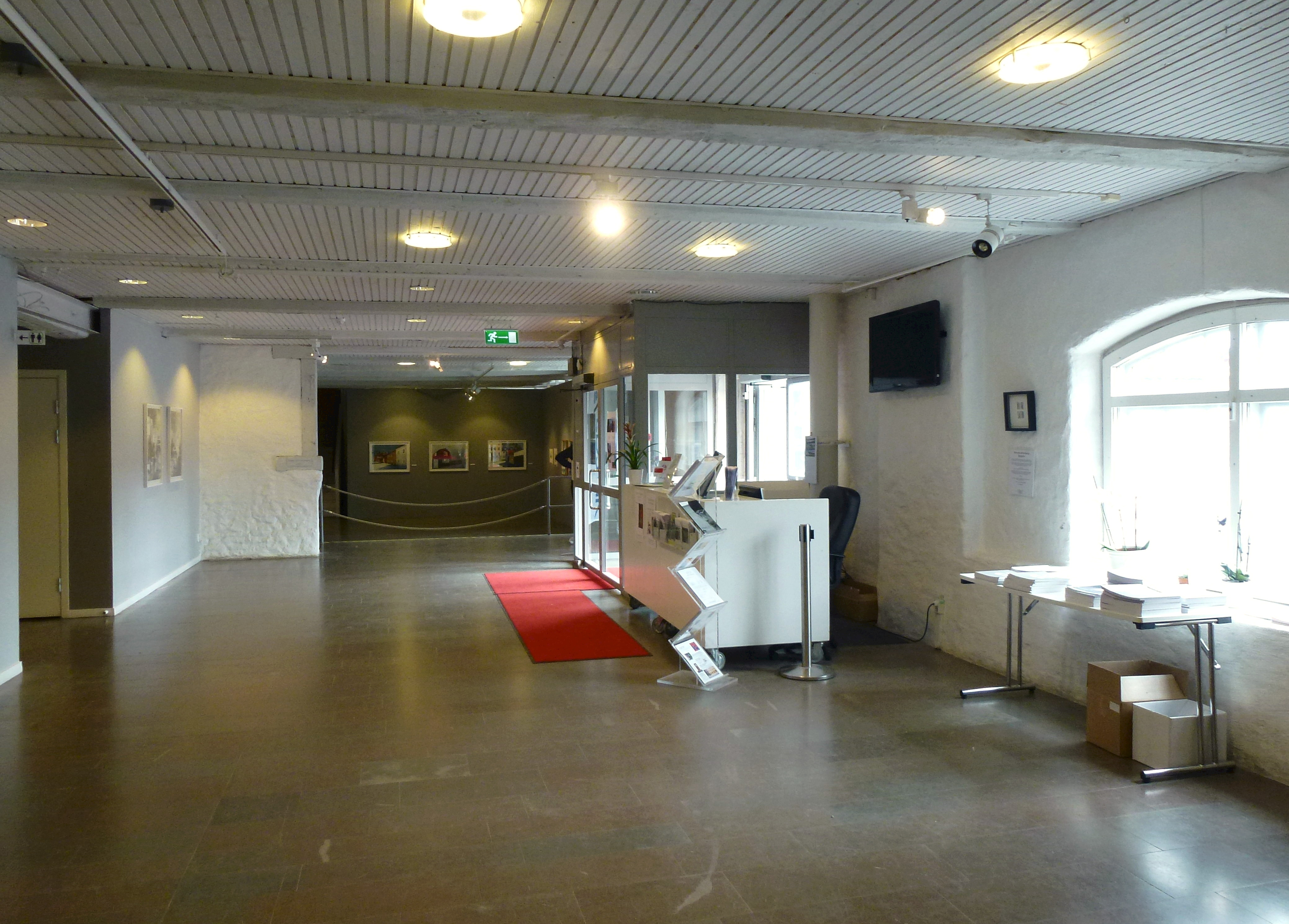
Ground floor, entrance

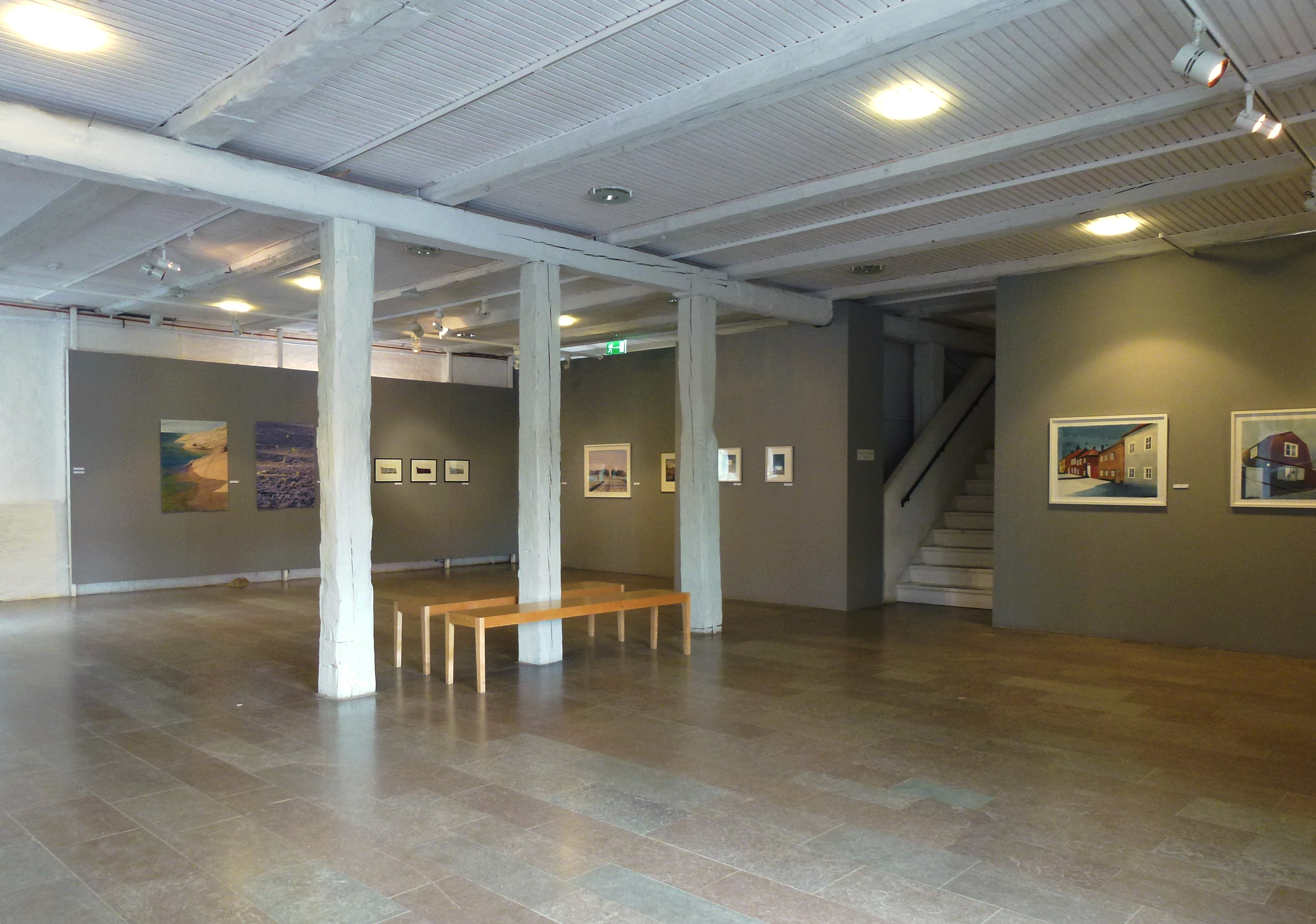
Ground floor, exhibition

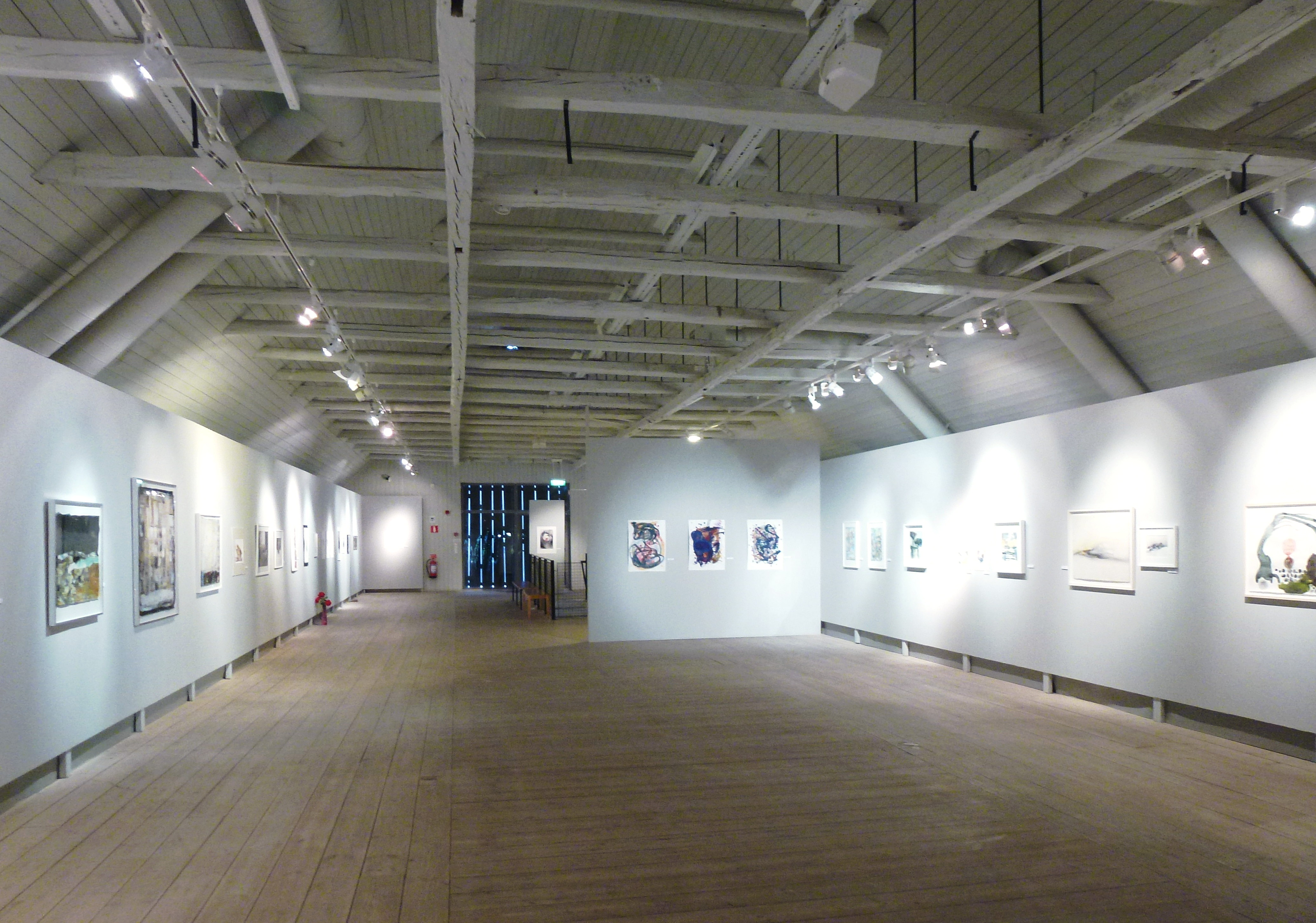
Attic, exhibition
