= Edsberg Castle =

Manor house and estate in Sollentuna Municipality, Sweden

Edsberg Manor
- Sweden
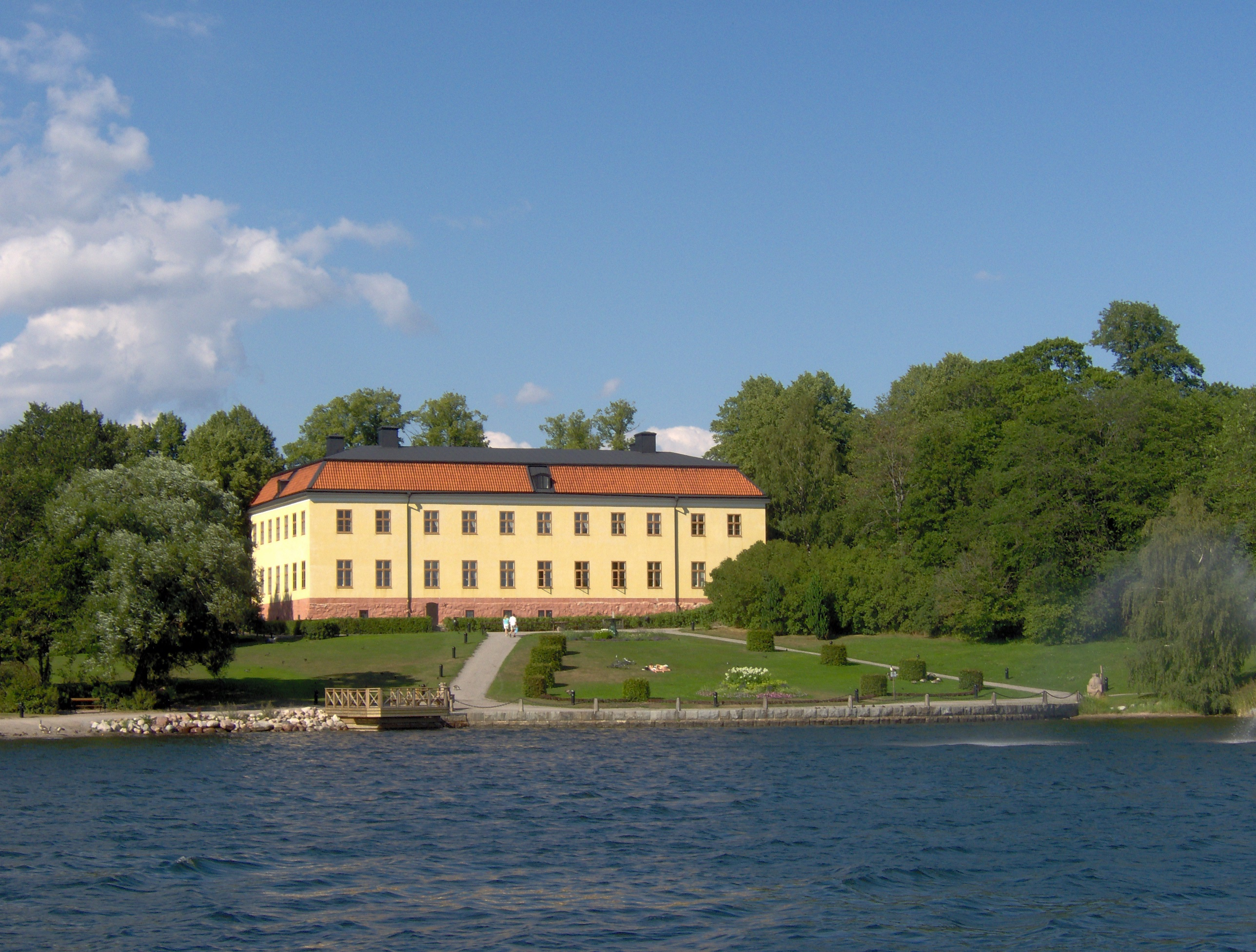

Site information
- Type: Manor House

Location
- Coordinates: 59°26′28″N 17°57′20″E

Edsbergs slott (Edsberg Manor) is a manor house and estate located by the bay of Edsviken in Sollentuna Municipality, north of Stockholm, Sweden.

== History ==
The building was constructed around 1630 as an estate for Henrik Olofsson. It was very soon after completion signed over to count Gabriel Bengtsson Oxenstierna (1586–1656) who changed it into a manor in 1647. Queen Christina of Sweden visited and stayed in the house in 1645. In 1670, when the manor had been inherited by the son Gabriel Gabrielsson Oxenstierna, King Charles XI of Sweden and the Queen Dowager Hedvig Eleonora of Holstein-Gottorp came for a visit.

The manor later belonged to the Rudbeck family, the first of which was the Governor of Stockholm, Thure Gustaf Rudbeck (1714-1786). In 1760 he replaced the old wooden construction with the stone building still in standing and in use today. The main building was most likely designed by architect Carl Wijnblad in simplified French rococo style and had two floors, plastered façade and two wings. Malla Silfverstolpe (1782-1861), the grand daughter of Thure Gustaf Rudbeck, grew up in the estate. Her diary gives a vivid and fascinating account of life at Edsberg during this time.

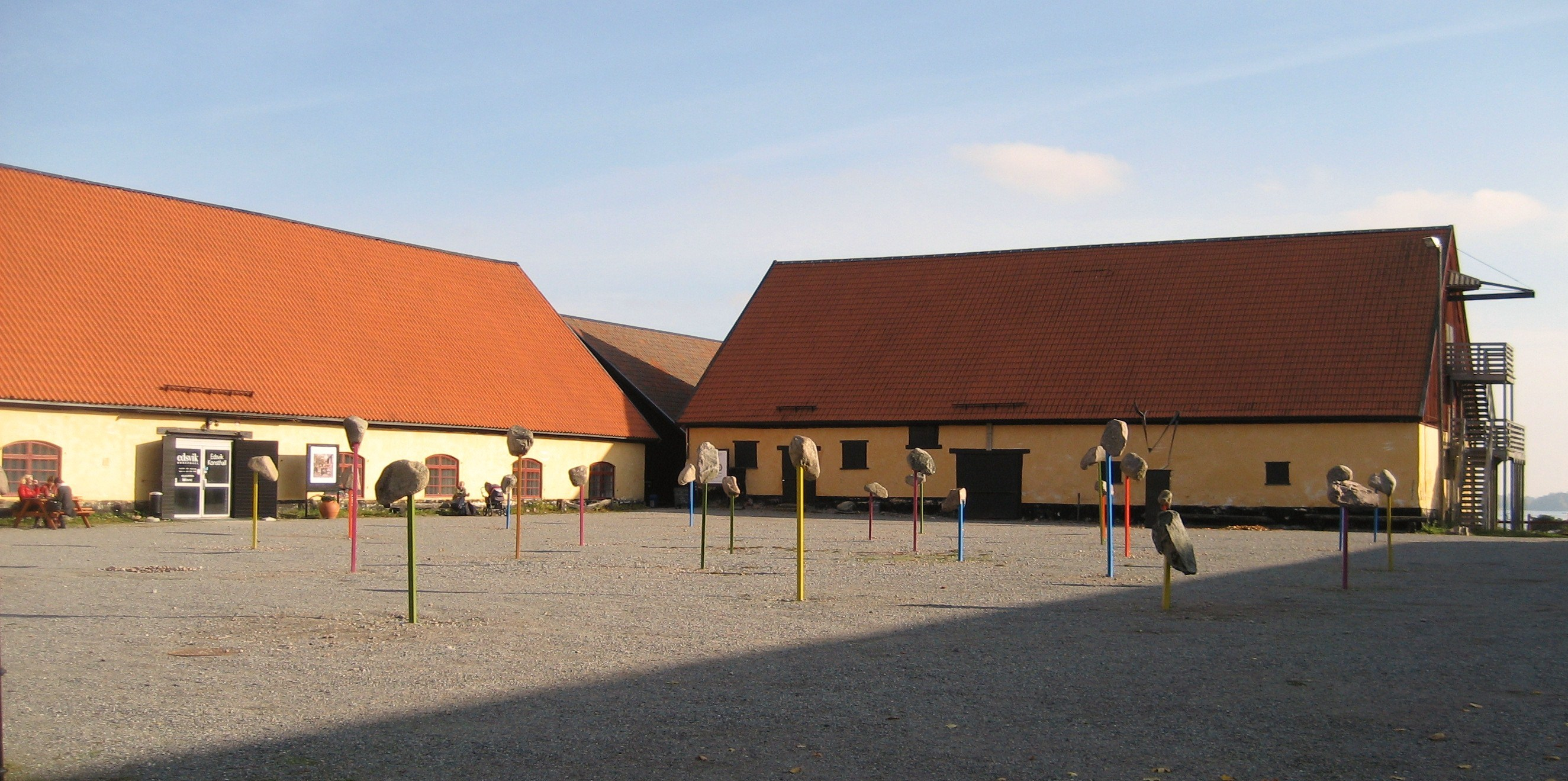
Edsvik Konsthall

== Present time ==
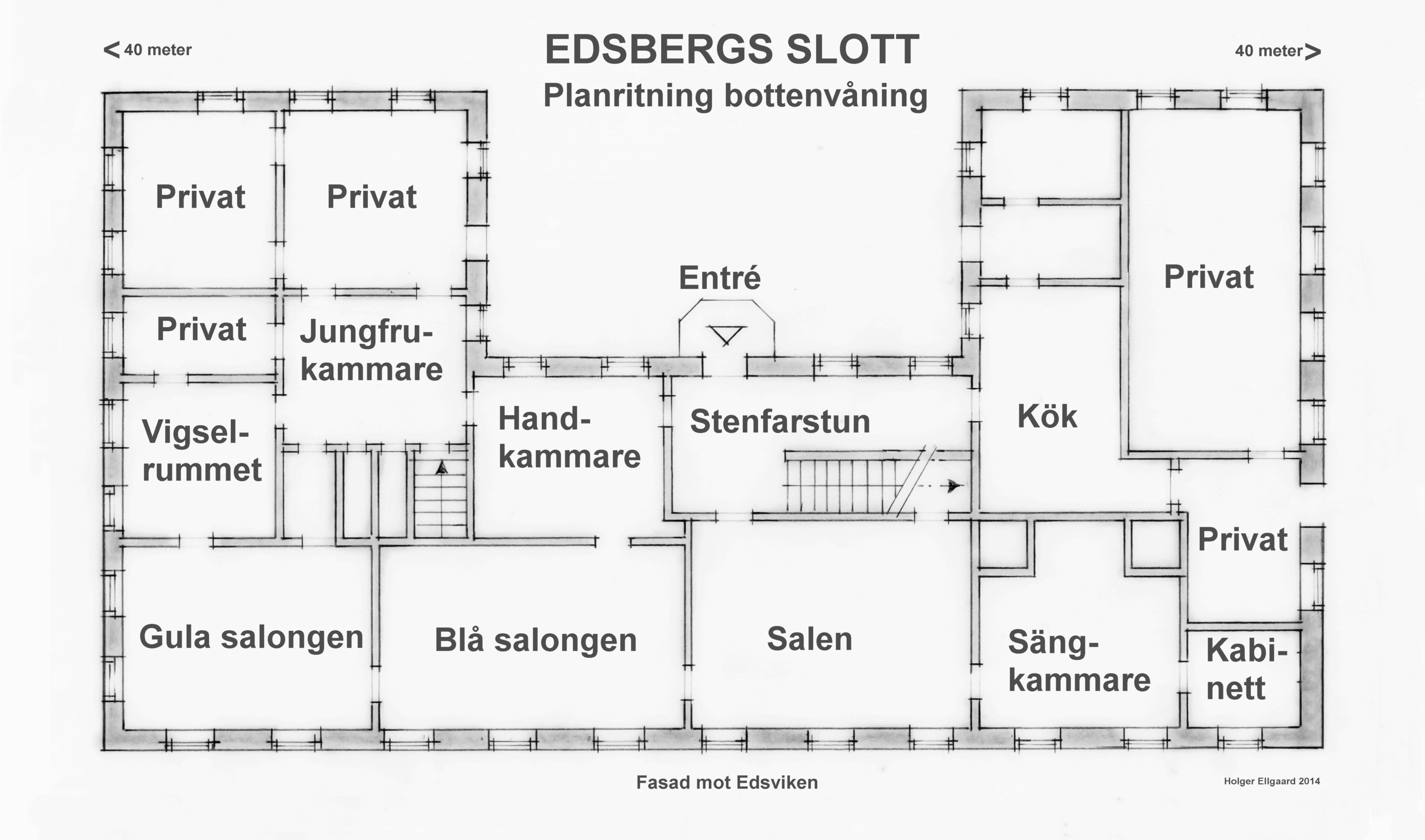
Edsberg Castle floor plan

Members of the Rudbeck family were owners of the estate for about 200 years, upon which the county of Sollentuna assumed ownership in 1959. Edsberg has undergone extensive renovation in the 1990s and 2006, and some parts are open to the public today. The manor housed Sveriges Radios Musikskola (music school of the Swedish National Radio). It now houses Edsbergs Musikinstitut; the independent chamber music division of the Royal College of Music. Students from the Royal College of Music spend full semesters at the estate for specialized classes in piano, violin, viola and cello, with emphasis on chamber music.

Edsvik Konsthall, an art gallery, is also located on the premises.

The grounds of Edsbergs Castle have also housed several outdoor festivals in the summer. Sollentuna Rock & Blues Festival and Schools Out Festival have both been held several times on the estate.

== Pictures of castle ==
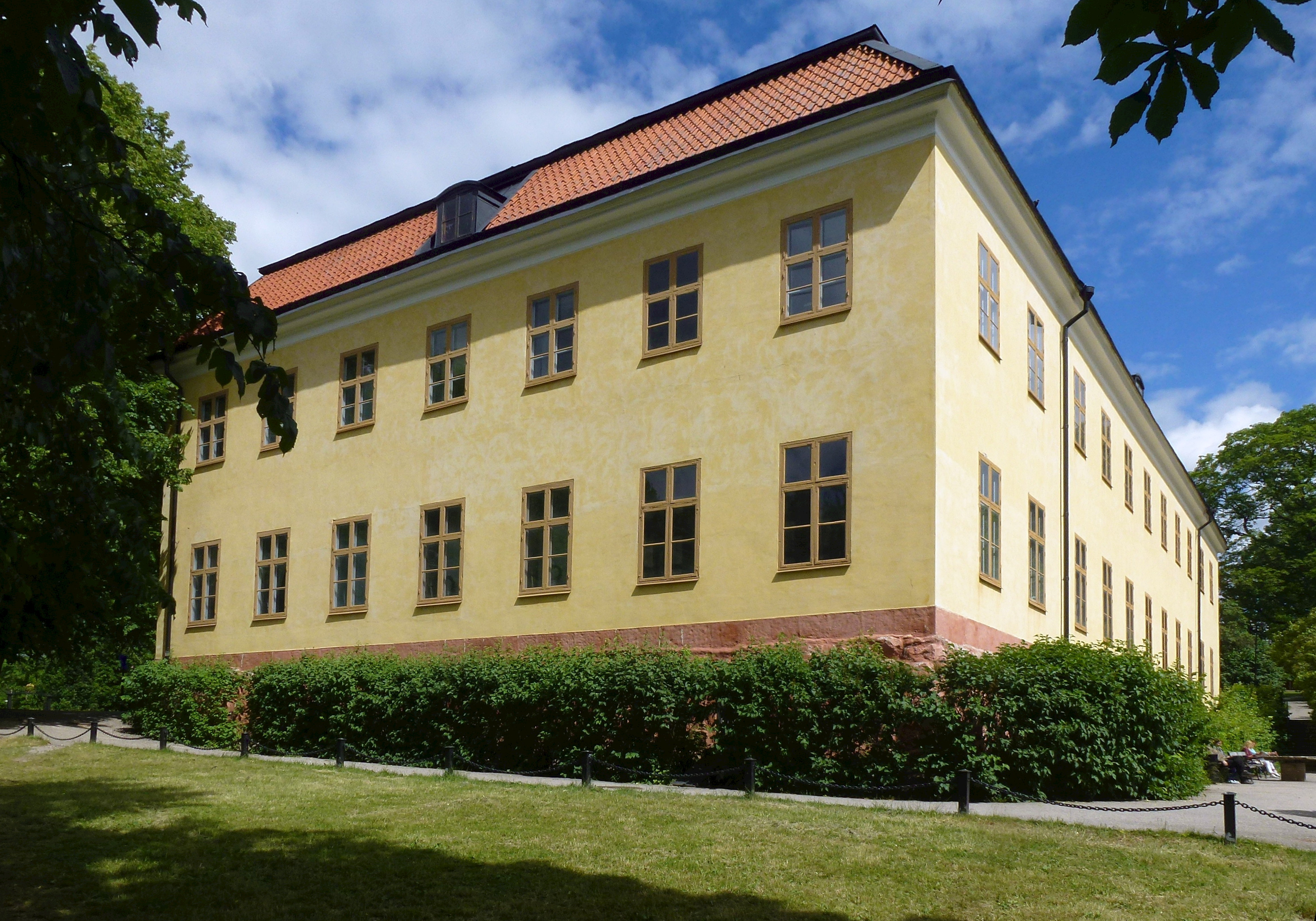
Facade to the west.

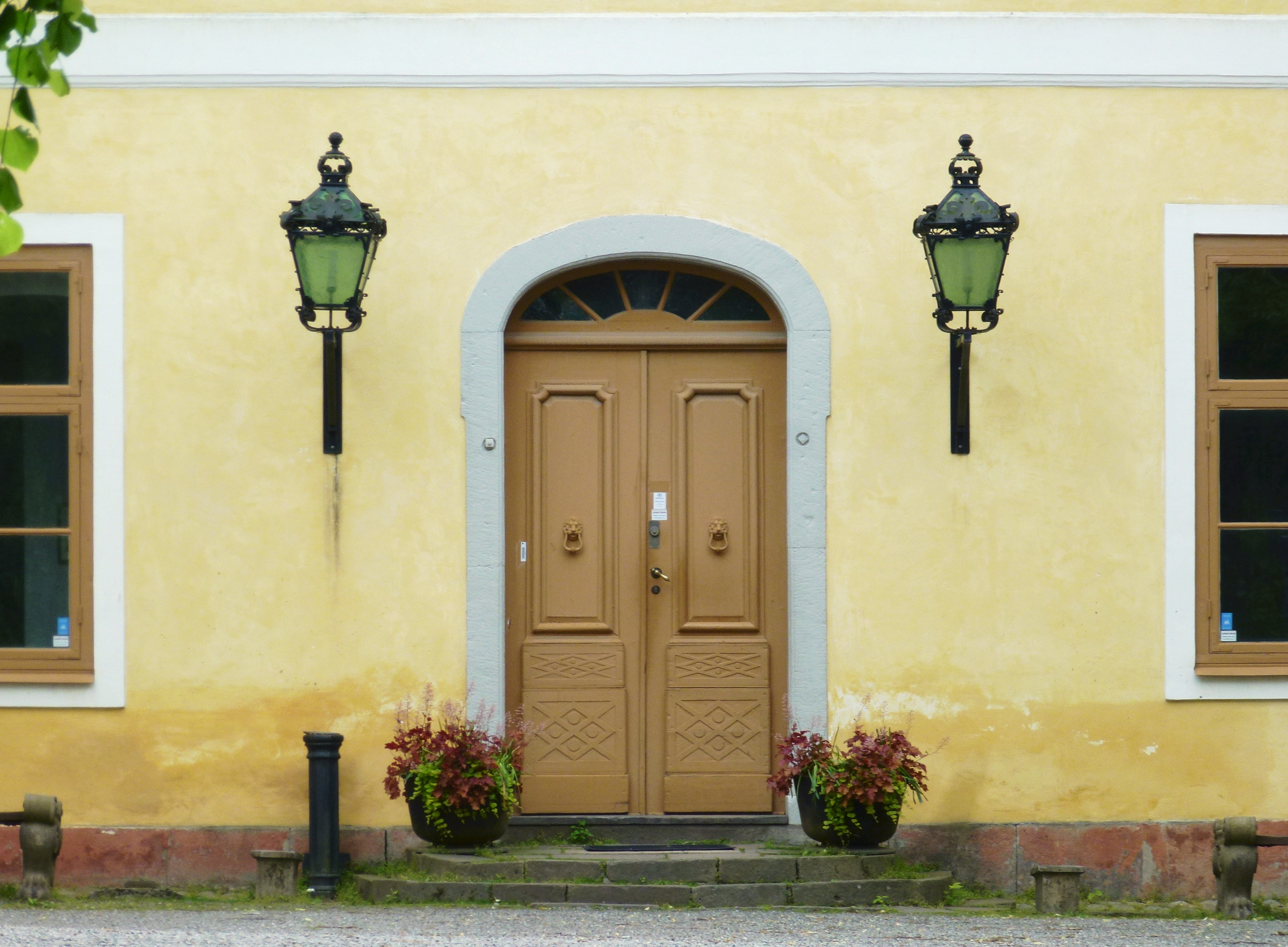
The main entrance.

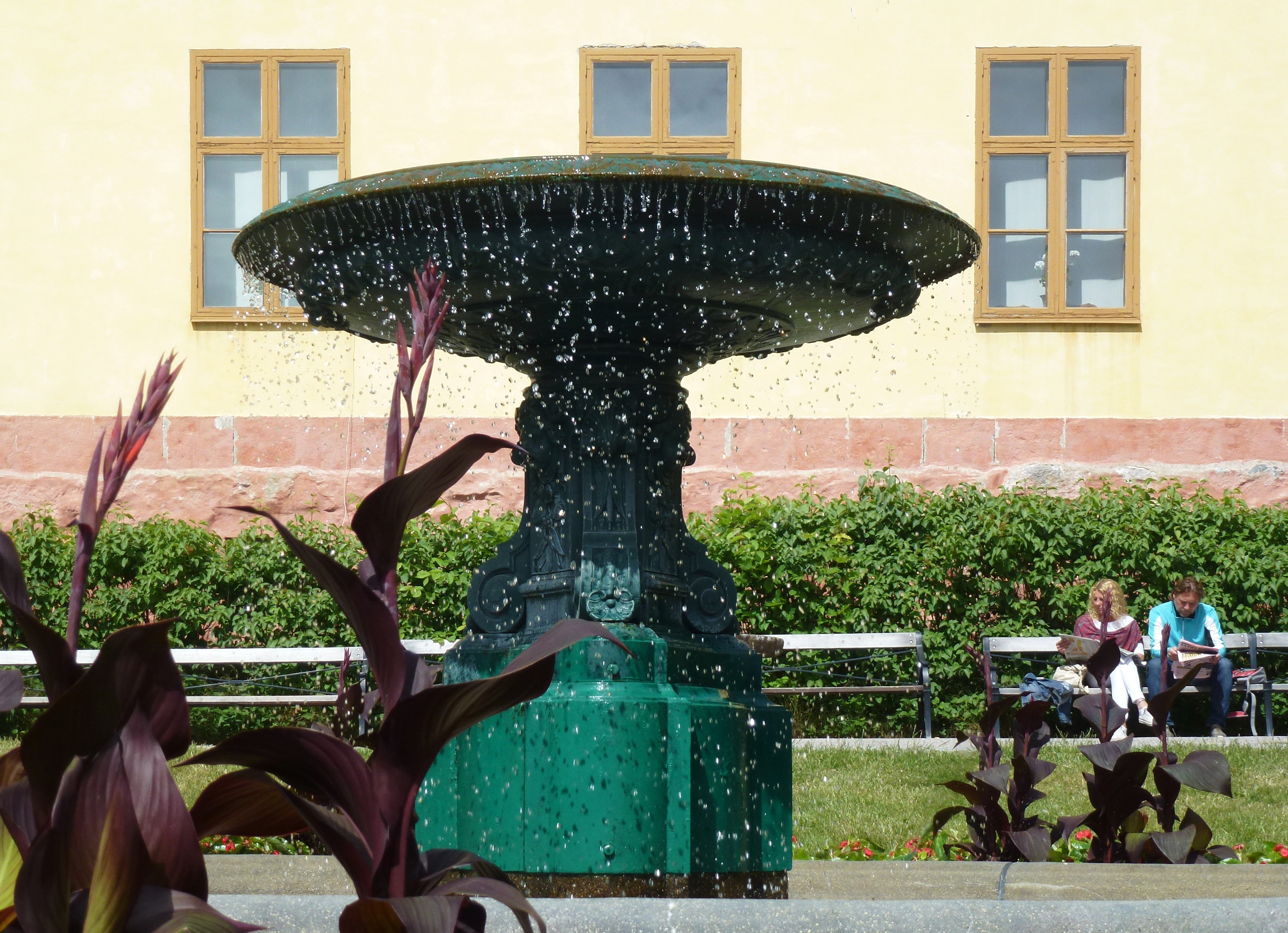
The fountain.

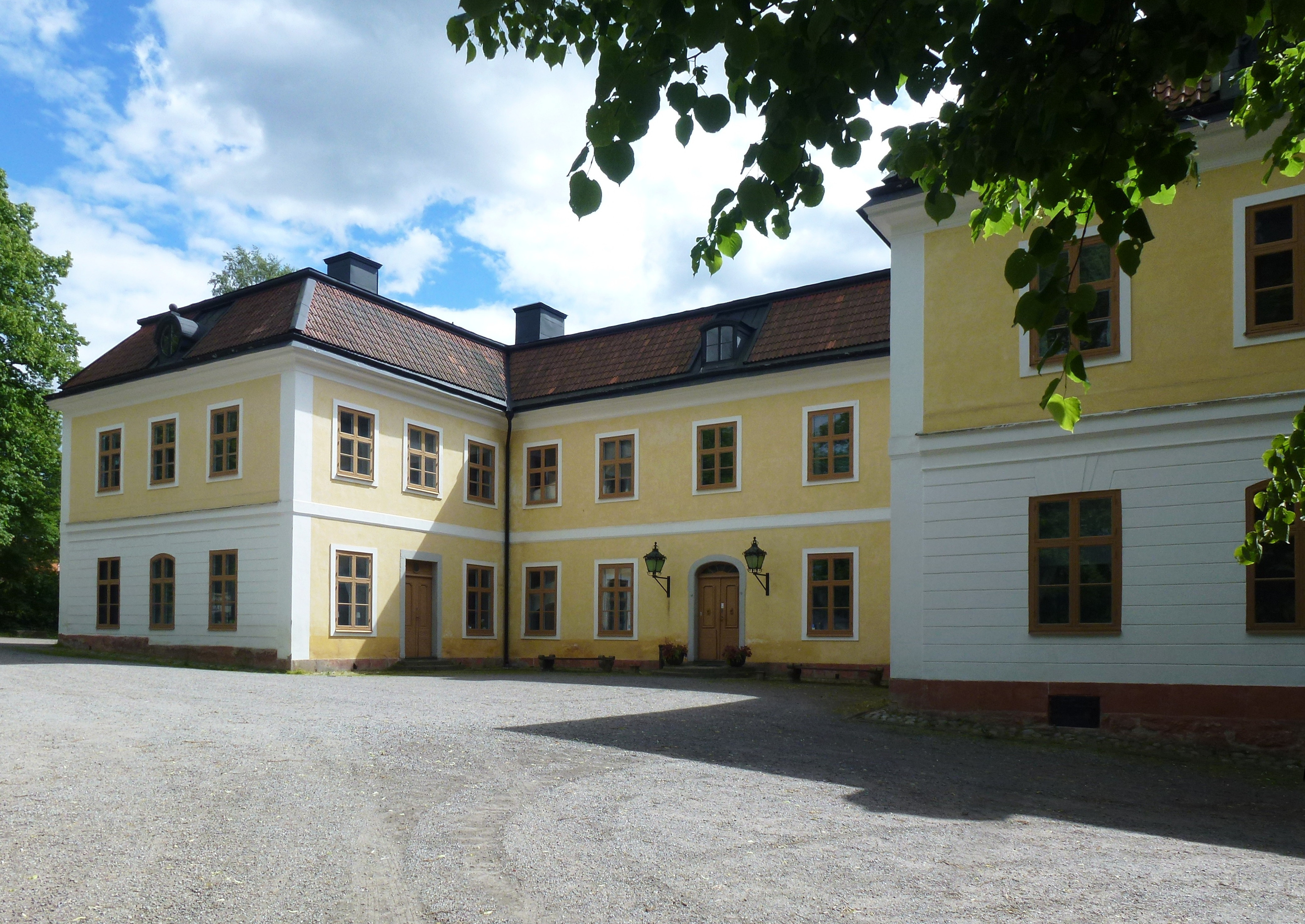
Facade to the north.

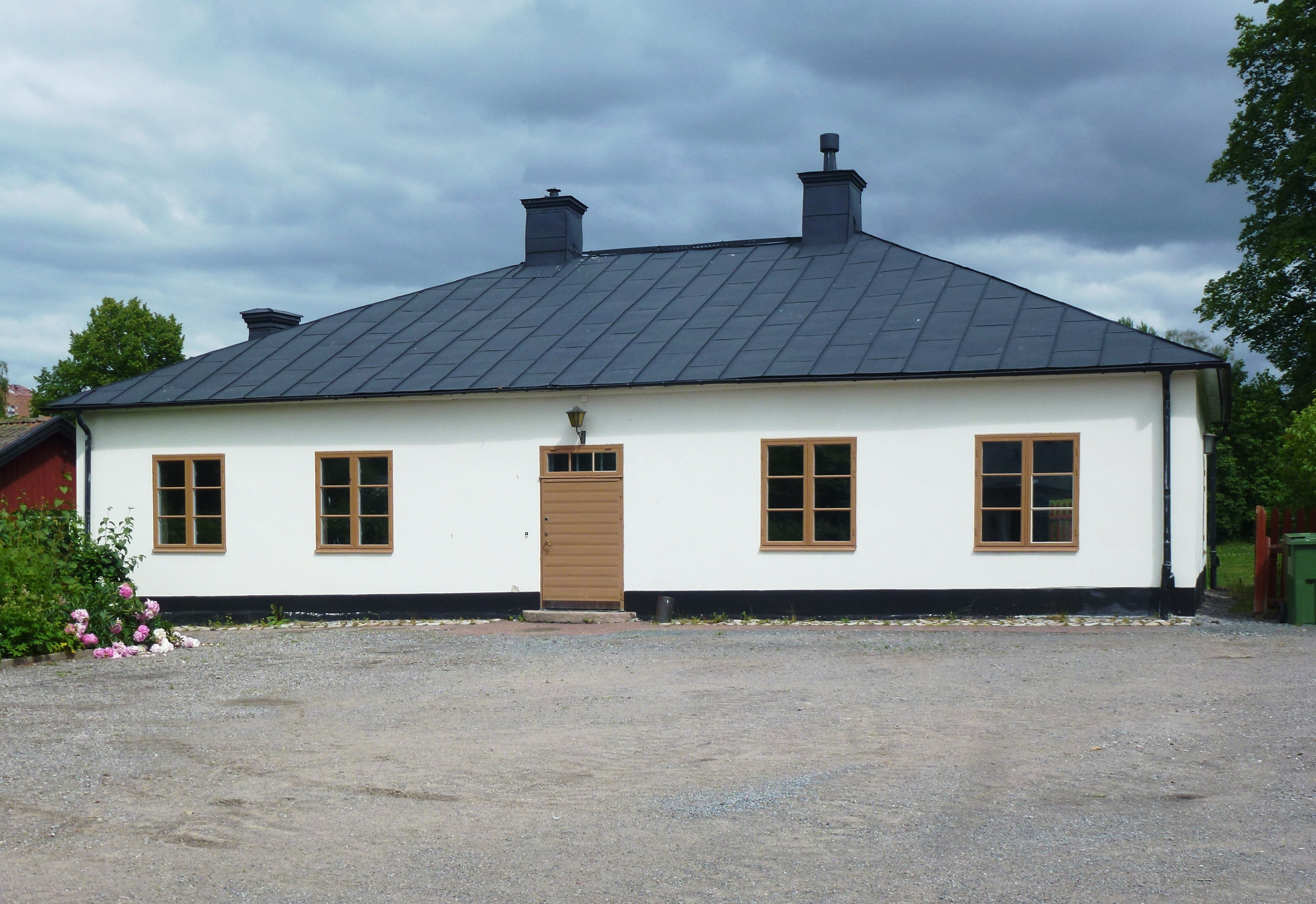
East wing.

== Pictures of other buildings ==
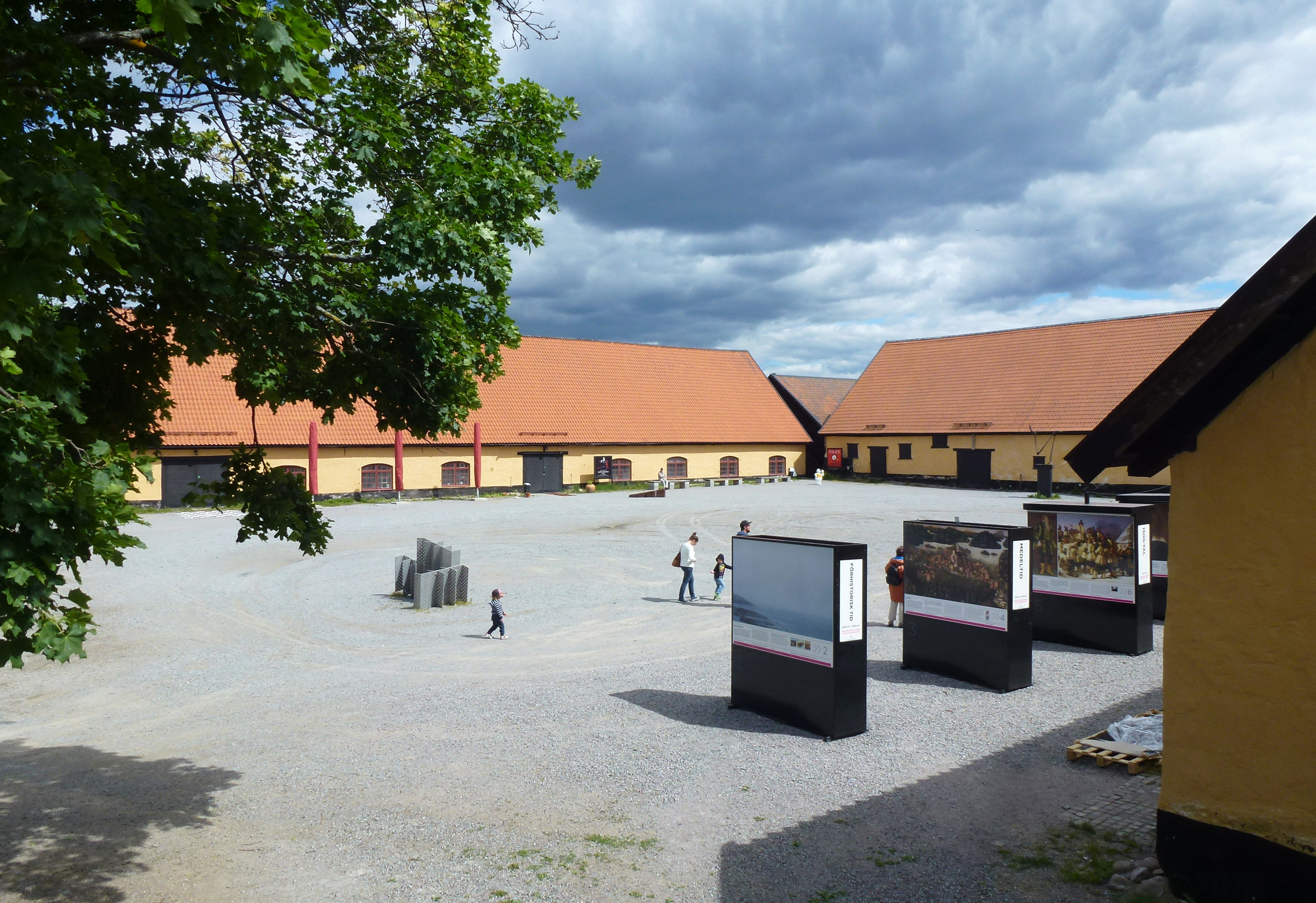
Stables.

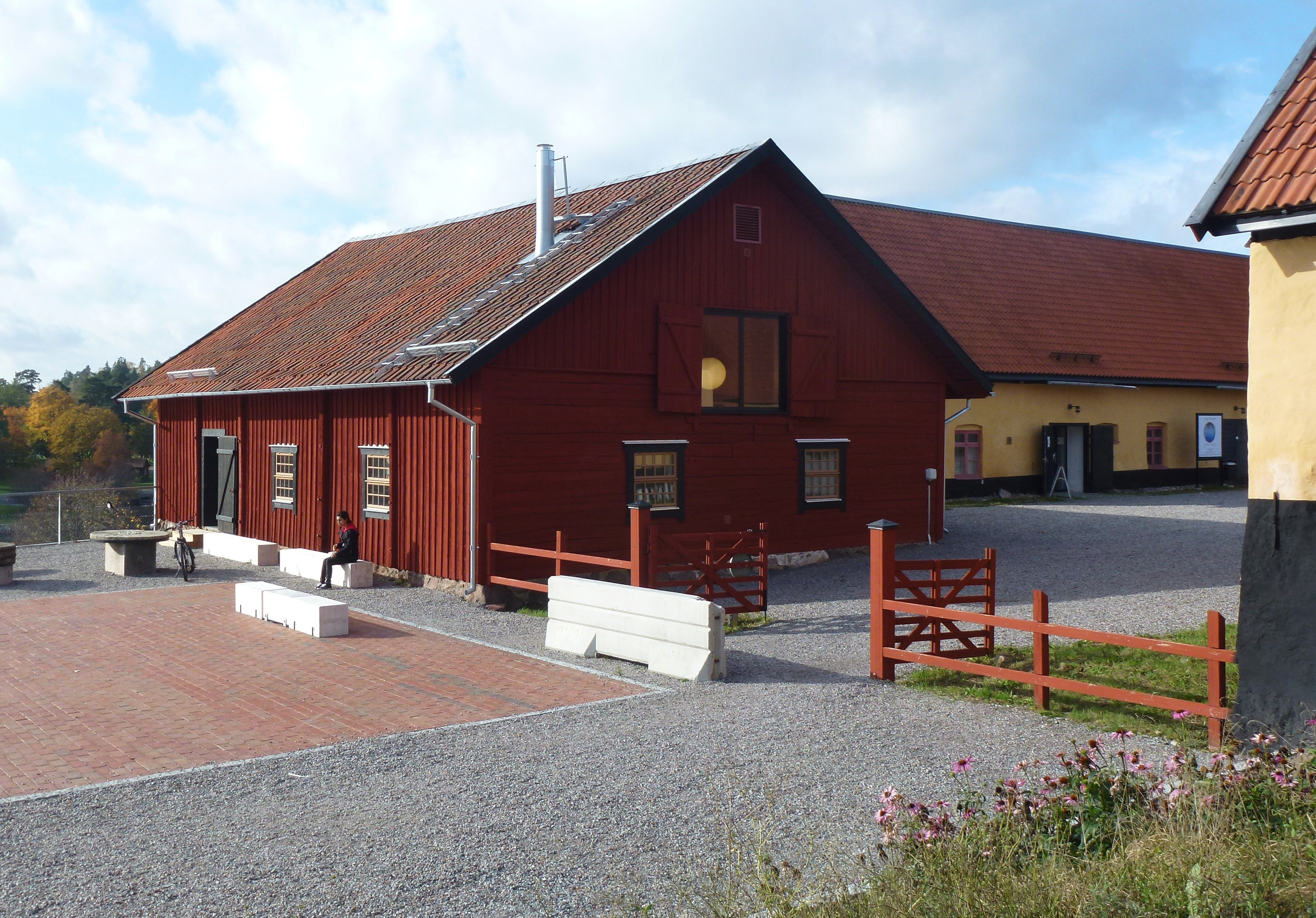
Bullpen

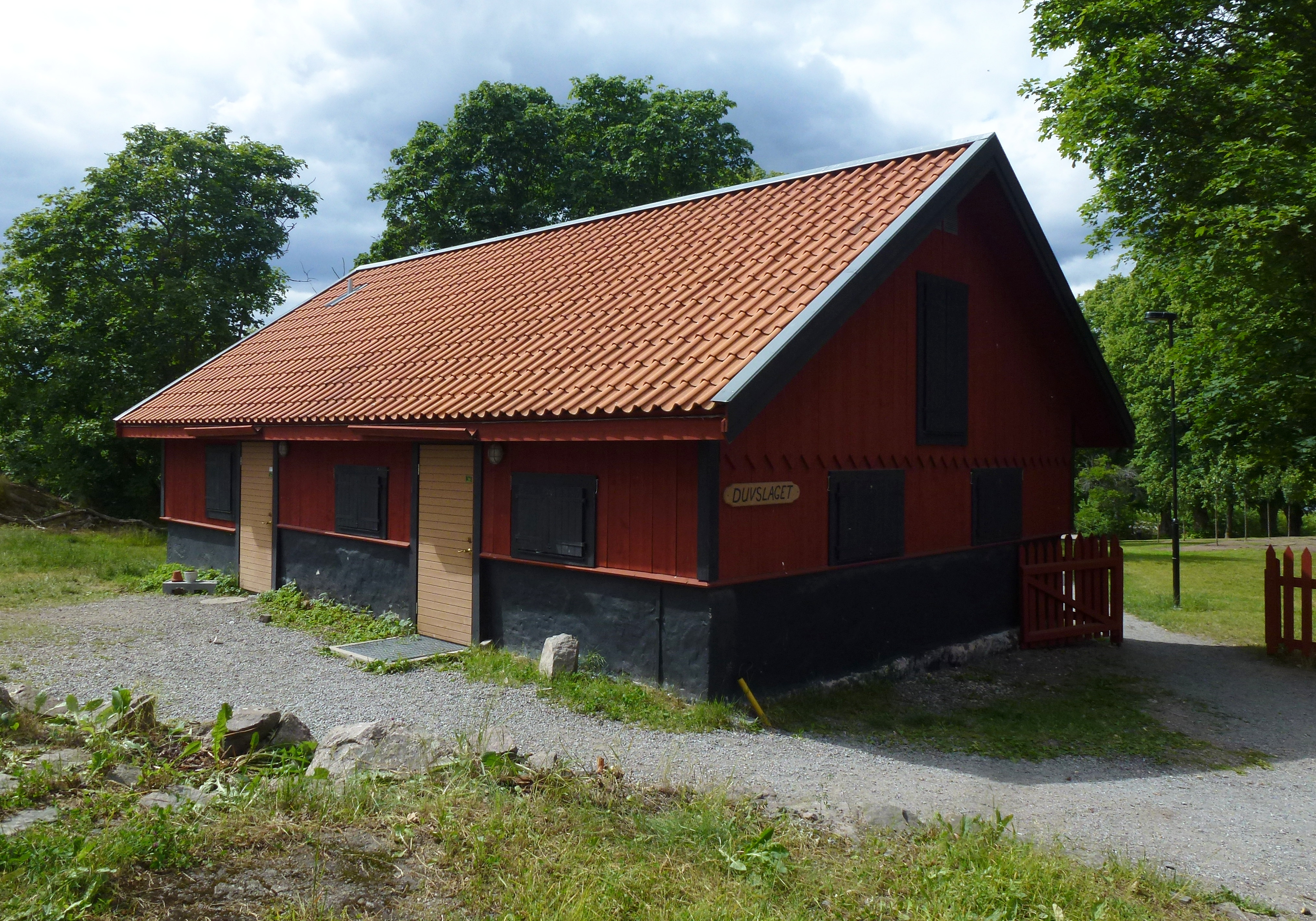
Dovecote

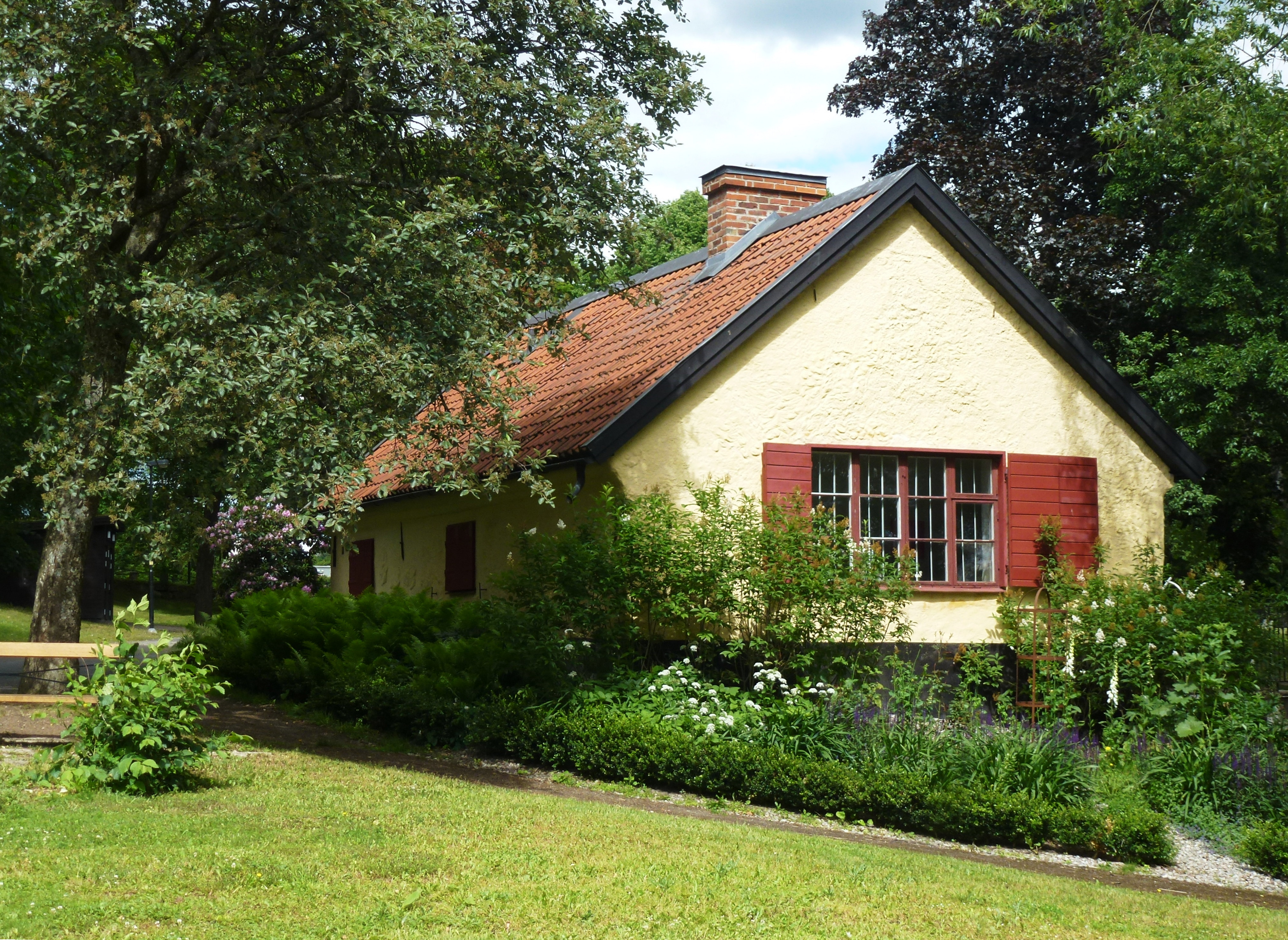
Brewery.

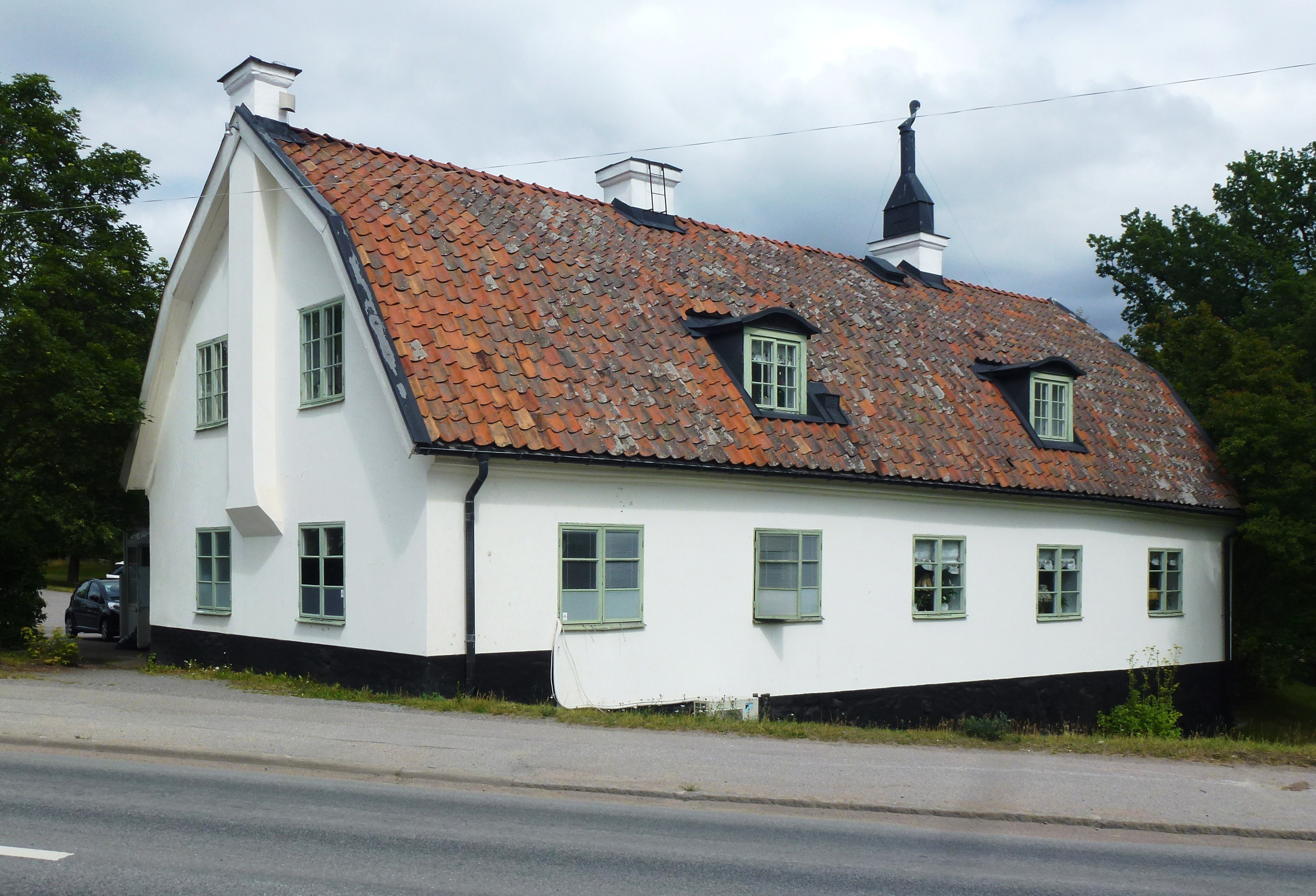
Edsbacka krog

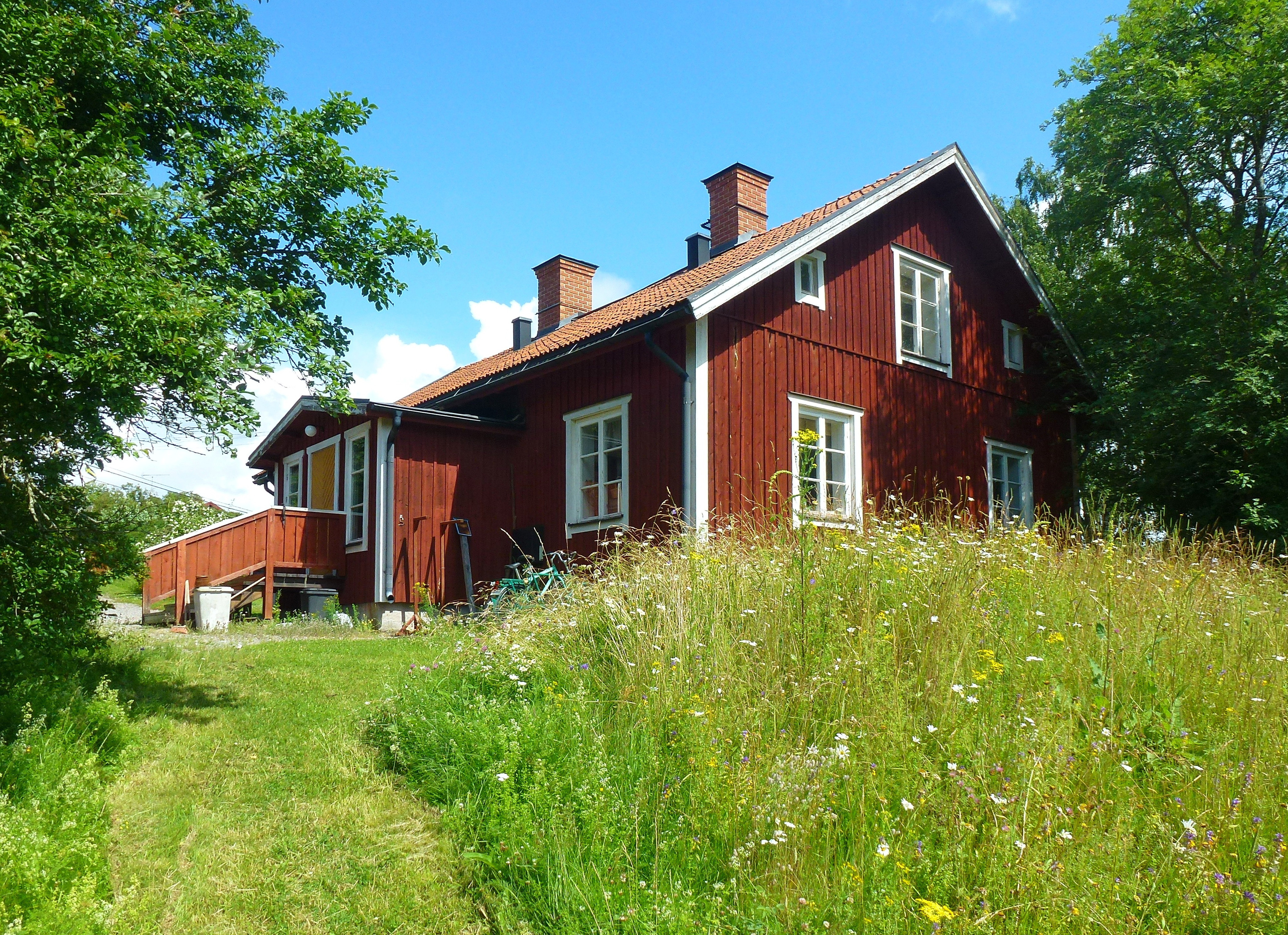
Väsby farm.

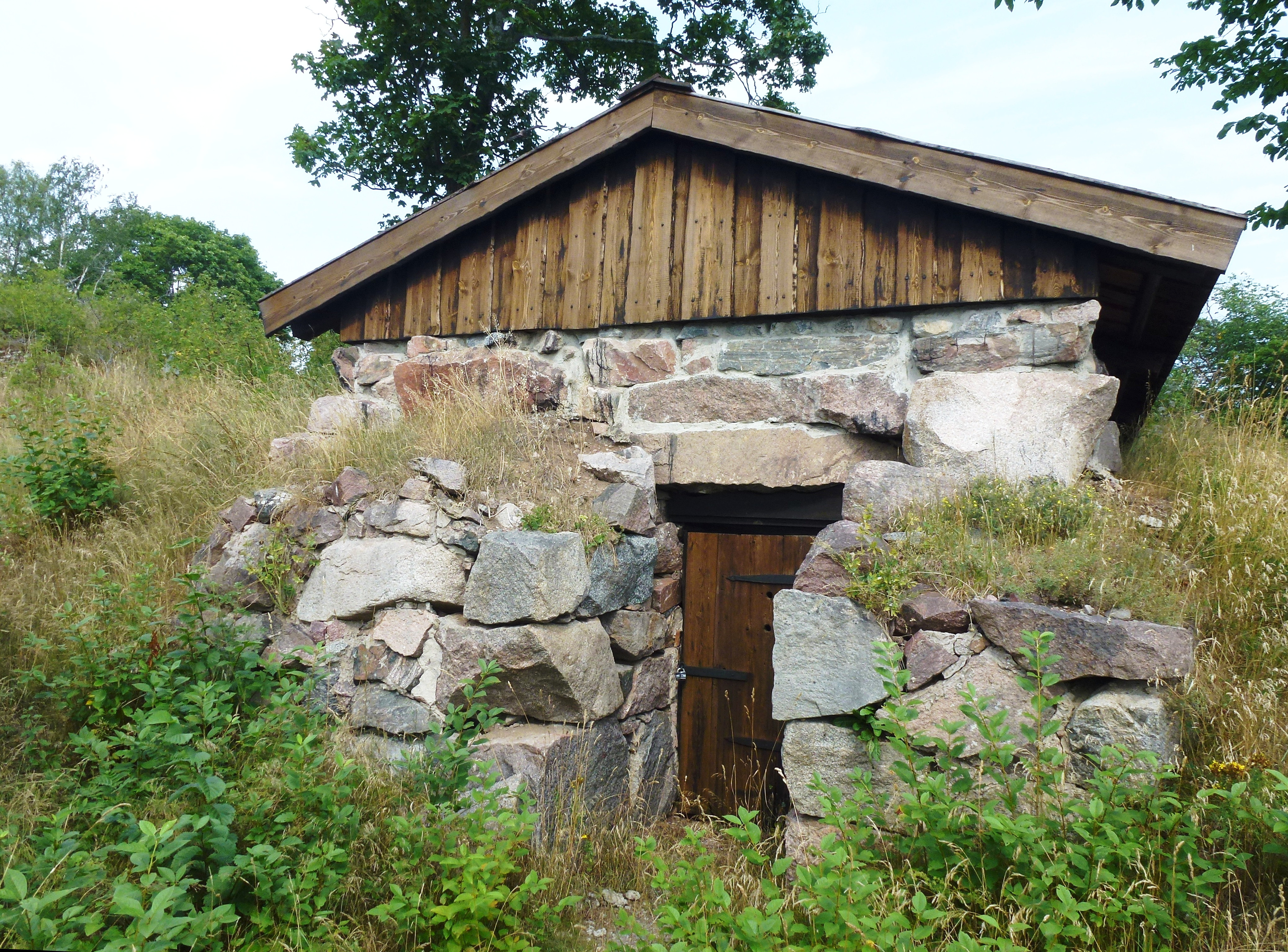
Milk cellar

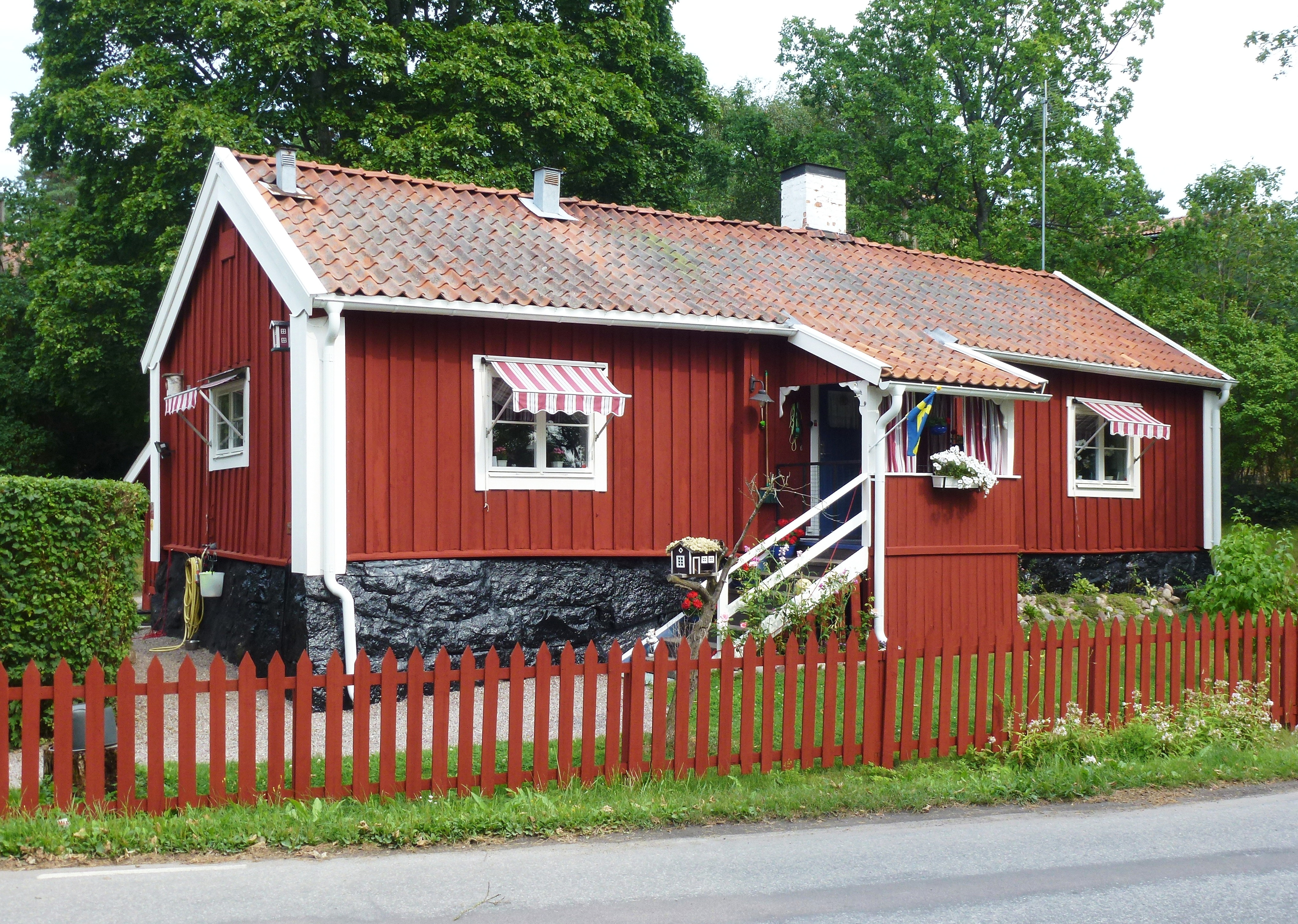
Cottage "Koberg".

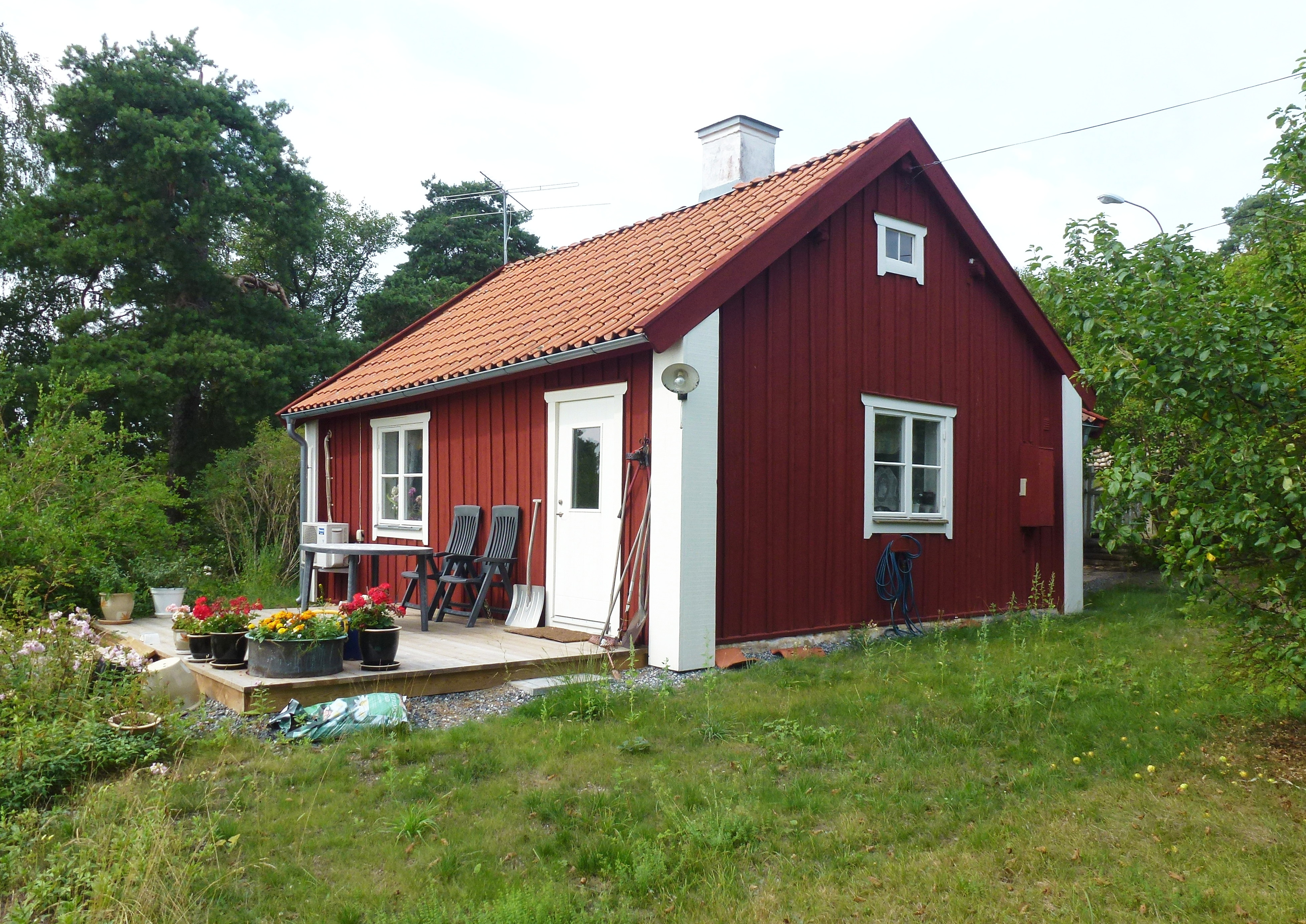
Cottage "Sjöstugan"

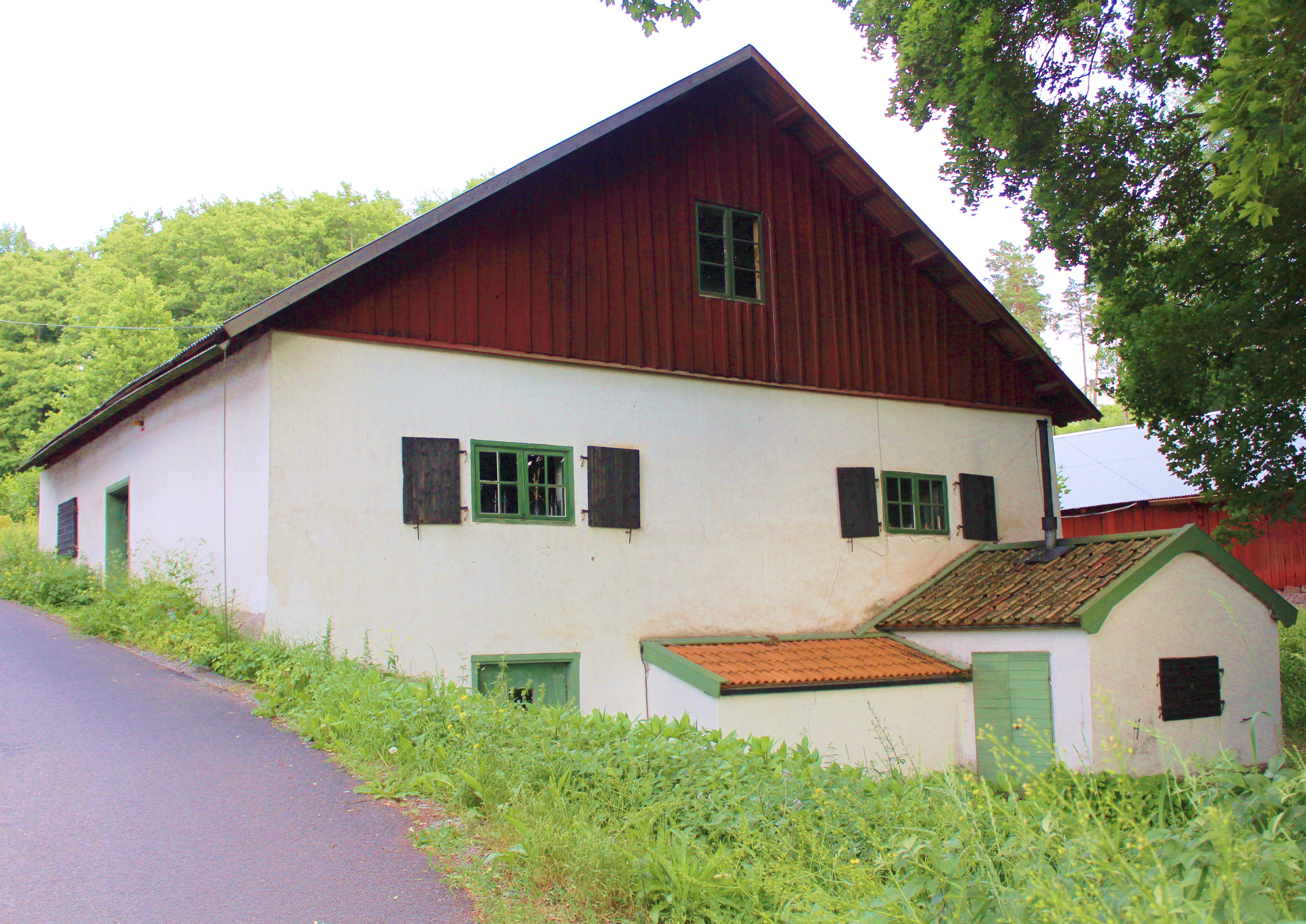
Landsnora mill and saw.

== Teachers at Edsberg ==
Ellen Nisbeth, viola

== See also ==
- List of castles in Sweden
