= Ellen Nisbeth =

Swedish violist (born 1987)

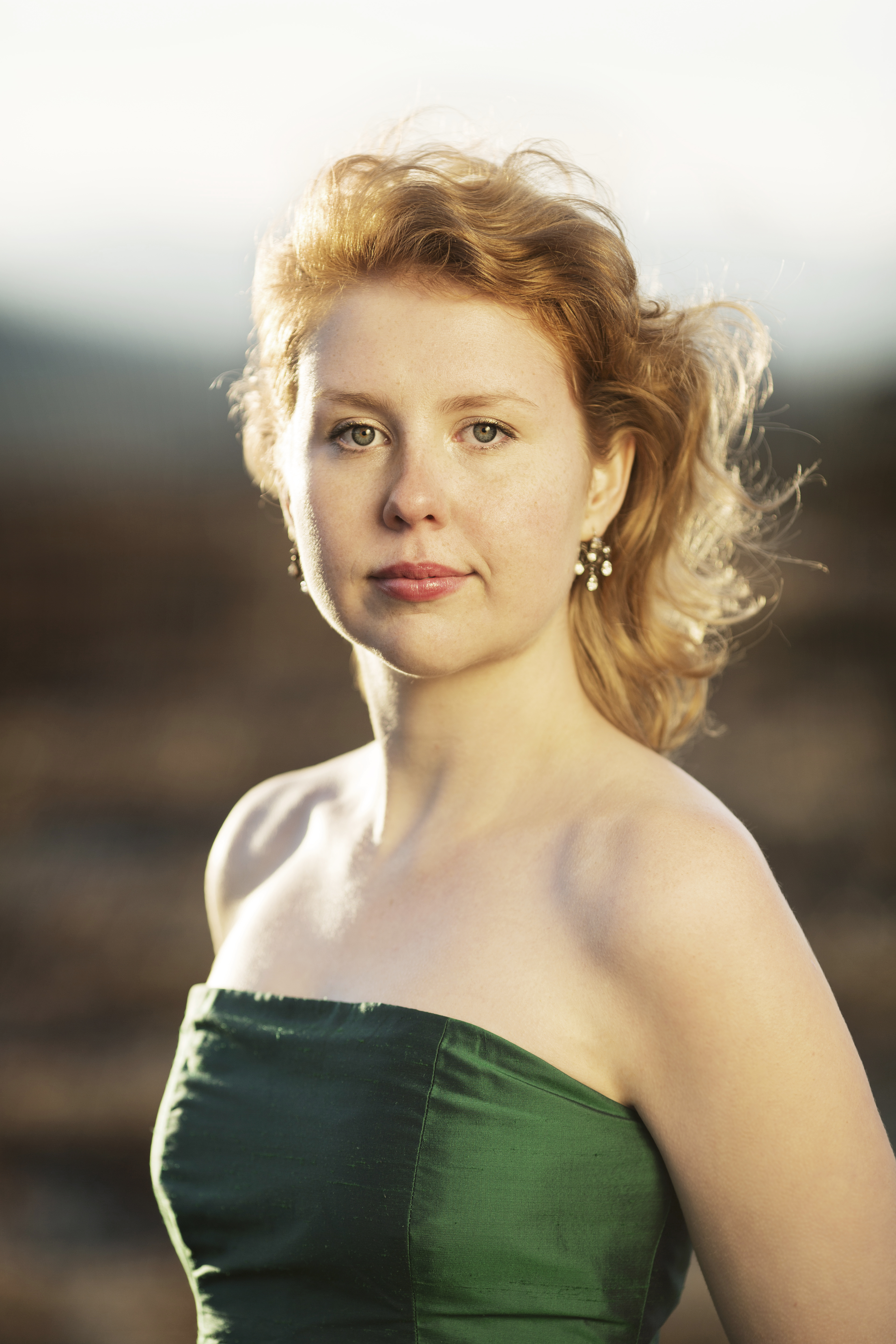
- Ellen Nisbeth in 2013
- Born: 16 June 1987 (age 38); Uppsala, Sweden
- Occupation: Violist
- Website: Official website

Ellen Nisbeth (born 1987) is a Swedish violist. She performed on Britta Byström's CD, "Invisible Cities" and on Ensemble Ernst's CD, "...BUT..." As part of the European Concert Hall Organisation's "Rising Star" program, Nisbeth performed "Tales Of Lost Times" for solo viola by Katarina Leyman and other works by Kaija Saariaho at Elbphilharmonie Concert Hall in January 2018.

== Career ==
Ellen Nisbeth studied viola with Peter Herresthal at the Royal College of Music, Stockholm. She also studied at The Royal College of Music in London and the Norwegian Academy of Music. In 2015, Nisbeth was appointed Associate Professor of Music at the University of Stavanger in Norway. Nisbeth also teaches at Edsberg Castle and the Royal College of Music, Stockholm. Regularly giving masterclasses and performing around the world, Nisbeth has achieved a well known status as a violist. She performs on a Dom Nicolo Amati viola from 1714.

== Discography ==
- ...BUT... (2012)
- Invisible Cities (2014)
- Let Beauty Awake (2017)

== Awards ==
- Swedish Soloist Prize (2013)
- Nordic Soloist Prize (2013)
