= The Magic Flute discography =

The following is a partial discography of the opera The Magic Flute (Die Zauberflöte) by Wolfgang Amadeus Mozart. It was composed and first performed in 1791, the year of the composer's death. Since the first complete recordings in 1937, the opera has been recorded many times.

In the list below, "Year" indicates the date the recording was made, rather than when it was issued . Most of these recordings have had multiple reissues, and in some cases are currently available on more than one label. The label information provided is usually the most recent issue of the recording, and where possible the release date has been provided.

== Recordings ==
=== Audio ===
Year	Cast (Tamino; Pamina; Sarastro; Queen of the Night; Papageno; Papagena)	Conductor, opera house and/or orchestral and choral forces	Label information	Notes
1937	Helge Rosvaenge; Jarmila Novotná; Alexander Kipnis; Júlia Osváth; Willi Domgraf-Fassbaender; Dora Komarek	Arturo Toscanini; Vienna Philharmonic and Vienna State Opera	Download only: Naxos 8110828-29; Released October 1999	Recording of a performance at the Salzburg Festival (30 July 1937)
1937	Walther Ludwig; Trude Eipperle; Josef von Manowarda; Lea Piltti; Karl Schmitt-Walter; Lily Preisig	Joseph Keilberth; Reichsenders Stuttgart Chorus and Orchestra	CD (2 discs): Preiser PR90254	Radio broadcast, recorded 10 December 1937
1937–38	Helge Rosvaenge; Tiana Lemnitz; Wilhelm Strienz; Erna Berger; Gerhard Hüsch; Irma Beilke	Thomas Beecham; Berlin Philharmonic and Favres Solisten Vereinigung	CD (2): Naxos 8110127-28	Recorded between 8 November 1937 and 8 March 1938
1941	Peter Anders; Maria Reining; Ludwig Weber; Lea Piltti; Alfred Poell; Dora Komarek	Karl Böhm; Wiener Philharmoniker	CD (2): MYTO Historical Line	Recorded at the Salzburg Festival, 2 August 1941
1942	Charles Kullman; Jarmila Novotná; Ezio Pinza; Josephine Antoine; John Brownlee; Lillian Raymondi	Bruno Walter; New York Metropolitan Opera	CD (2): Andromeda ANDRCD5020; Released July 2007	Recorded live at the Metropolitan Opera House, 26 December 1942
1949	Walther Ludwig; Irmgard Seefried; Josef Greindl; Wilma Lipp; Karl Schmitt-Walter; Edith Oravez; Cast also includes: Gertrude Grob-Prandl; Paul Schöffler; Ernst Haefliger; Hermann Uhde	Wilhelm Furtwängler; Vienna Philharmonic and Vienna State Opera	CD (3): Orfeo C650053D	Recording of a performance at the Salzburg Festival (27 July 1949)
1950	Anton Dermota; Irmgard Seefried; Ludwig Weber; Wilma Lipp; Erich Kunz; Emmy Loose	Herbert von Karajan; Wiener Philharmoniker and Singverein der Gesellschaft der Muskifreunde in Wien	CD (2): EMI 3367692	Dialogue not included
1953	Nicolai Gedda; Elisabeth Schwarzkopf; Mario Petri; Rita Streich; Giuseppe Taddei; Alda Noni	Herbert von Karajan; RAI Roma chorus and orchestra	CD (2): Walhall WLCD001	Recorded from radio broadcast 20 December 1953, in Italian.
1954	Rudolf Schock; Teresa Stich-Randall; Josef Greindl; Wilma Lipp; Erich Kunz; Kristina Sert	Joseph Keilberth; Orchester des Westdeutschen Rundfunk; Nordwestdeutschen Rundfunks	CD (2): Capriccio C67157; Released January 2006	Recording of radio broadcast, without dialogue, on 19 December 1954.
1955	Ernst Kozub; Elisabeth Grümmer; Gottlob Frick; Erika Köth; Günther Ambrosius; Hanny Steffek	Georg Solti; Hessischer Rundfunk Orchestra and Chorus	CD (2): Gala GL100743	
1955	Léopold Simoneau; Hilde Güden; Kurt Böhme; Wilma Lipp; Walter Berry; Emmy Loose	Karl Böhm; Vienna Philharmonic and Vienna State Opera	CD (2): Decca E4487342	Without dialogue; first recording in stereo
1955	Ernst Haefliger; Maria Stader; Josef Greindl; Rita Streich; Dietrich Fischer-Dieskau; Lisa Otto	Ferenc Fricsay; RIAS Symphonie-Orchester und Kammerchor	Deutsche Grammophon 435-741-2	Complete recording at Internet Archive
1956	Brian Sullivan; Lucine Amara; Jerome Hines; Roberta Peters; Theodor Uppman; Laurel Hurley	Bruno Walter; New York Metropolitan Opera and Chorus	CD (2): Walhall WLCD0181; Released February 2007	Recorded 3 March 1956 at the Metropolitan Opera House: Sung in English
1958	Fritz Wunderlich; Maria van Dongen; Albert van Haasteren; Julianna Farkas; Jan Derksen; Nel Duval	Bernard Haitink; Het Radio Philharmonic Orchestra and Chorus	CD (2): Myto MCD00278	Broadcast performance recorded 24 May 1958
1959	Léopold Simoneau; Lisa Della Casa; Kurt Böhme; Erika Köth; Walter Berry; Graziella Sciutti	George Szell; Vienna Philharmonic and Vienna State Opera	CD (2):Gala GL100502	Recorded at the Salzburg Festival 27 July 1959
1960	Richard Lewis; Pilar Lorengar; Mihály Székely; Margareta Hallin; Geraint Evans; Dodi Protero	Colin Davis; Royal Philharmonic Orchestra and Glyndebourne Festival Chorus	CD (2): Walhall WLCD0323; Released February 2011	Recorded at the 1960 Glyndebourne Festival
1960	Fritz Wunderlich; Liselotte Fölser; Gottlob Frick; Erika Köth; Walter Berry; Graziella Sciutti	Joseph Keilberth; Vienna Philharmonic and Vienna State Opera	CD (3):Andromeda ANDRCD9077; Released January 2011	Recorded at the Salzburg Festival, 12 August 1960
1964	Nicolai Gedda; Gundula Janowitz; Gottlob Frick; Lucia Popp; Walter Berry; Ruth-Margret Pütz; Cast also includes: Elisabeth Schwarzkopf; Christa Ludwig	Otto Klemperer; Philharmonia Orchestra and Chorus	CD (2): Warner Classics 643782	Dialogue not included
1964	Fritz Wunderlich; Evelyn Lear; Franz Crass; Roberta Peters; Dietrich Fischer-Dieskau; Lisa Otto; Cast also includes: Hans Hotter	Karl Böhm; Berliner Philharmoniker & RIAS Kammerchor	CD (2): Deutsche Grammophon 4497492	
1964	Fritz Wunderlich; Anneliese Rothenberger; Karl-Christian Kohn; Erika Köth; Hermann Prey; Gertrud Freedman	Fritz Rieger; Münchner Philharmoniker und Chor der Bayerischen Staatsoper	CD (3): Golden Melodram Opera Live GM50027; Released Jone 2010	Recorded at the Nationaltheater, Munich, 26 July 1964
1969	Stuart Burrows; Pilar Lorengar; Martti Talvela; Cristina Deutekom; Hermann Prey; Renate Holm; Cast also includes: Dietrich Fischer-Dieskau as the Speaker	Georg Solti; Wiener Philharmoniker and Wiener Staatsopernchor	CD (3): Decca Originals 4780394; Released June 2008	
1970	Peter Schreier; Helen Donath; Theo Adam; Sylvia Geszty; Günther Leib	Otmar Suitner; Staatskapelle Dresden & Rundfunkchor Leipzig	CD (3): RCA Victor 6511-2-RG; Released 1987	
1972	Peter Schreier; Anneliese Rothenberger; Kurt Moll; Edda Moser; Walter Berry; Olivera Miljaković	Wolfgang Sawallisch; Bayerischen Staatsoper orchestra and chorus	CD (2): EMI Electrola 0882742	Moser's performance of the Queen of the Night aria was included on the Voyager Golden Record, shot into space aboard Voyager 1 and Voyager 2 in 1977.
1975	Josef Köstlinger; Irma Urrila; Ulrik Cold; Birgit Nordin; Håkan Hagegård; Elisabeth Erikson	Eric Ericson; Swedish Radio Symphony Orchestra and Choir	SR Records/EMI RXLP 1226/28 (LP) / 7498712 (CD reissue)	The actual soundtrack to the 1975 film of the same name; recorded in Cirkus April–May 1974
1980	Francisco Araiza; Edith Mathis; José van Dam; Karin Ott; Gottfried Hornik; Janet Perry	Herbert von Karajan; Berliner Philharmoniker, Deutsche Oper Berlin Chorus	CD (2): DG Opera! 4779115; Released August 2011	
1980	Éric Tappy; Ileana Cotrubaș; Martti Talvela; Zdzisława Donat; Christian Boesch; Elisabeth Kales	James Levine; Wiener Philharmoniker and Wiener Staatsopernchor	CD (3): RCA Red Seal 82876-87760-2; Released August 2006	
1981	Wolfgang Brendel; Siegfried Jerusalem; Edita Gruberová; Lucia Popp; Roland Bracht; Brigitte Lindner	Bernard Haitink; Bavarian Radio Symphony Orchestra, Chor des Bayerischen Rundfunks	His Master's Voice – 1C 165-43 110/12 T	1981, EMI studio stereo recording.
1984	Peter Schreier; Margaret Price; Kurt Moll; Luciana Serra; Mikael Melbye; Maria Venuti	Colin Davis; Dresdener Staatskapelle und Kreuzchor, Leipziger Rundfunkchor	CD (2): Decca Duo 4425682	
1987	Hans Peter Blochwitz; Barbara Bonney; Matti Salminen; Edita Gruberová; Anton Scharinger; Edith Schmid	Nikolaus Harnoncourt; Zurich Opera Orchestra and Chorus	CD (2): Teldec 2292427162	
1989	Francisco Araiza; Kiri Te Kanawa; Samuel Ramey; Cheryl Studer; Olaf Bär; Eva Lind	Neville Marriner; Academy of St Martin in the Fields and Ambrosian Opera Chorus	CD (2): Philips 426 276-2	
1989	Stefan Dahlberg; Ann Christine Biel; László Polgár; Birgit Louise Frandsen; Mikael Samuelson; Birgita Larsson	Arnold Östman; Drottningholm Palace Theatre Orchestra and Chorus	CD (2): Decca 4700562	
1990	Anthony Rolfe Johnson; Dawn Upshaw; Cornelius Hauptmann; Beverly Hoch; Andreas Schmidt; Catherine Pierard	Roger Norrington; London Classical Players and Schütz Choir of London	CD (2): Virgin Veritas 4820732	
1990	Uwe Heilmann; Ruth Ziesak; Kurt Moll; Sumi Jo; Michael Kraus; Lotte Leitner	Georg Solti; Wiener Philharmoniker and Wiener Staatsopern choir	CD (2): Decca Opera Sets E4332102	
1990	Nils Brown; Monica Whicher; Gordon McLeod (singing)/Richard Binsley (speaking); Marjorie Sparks (singing)/Barbara Budd (speaking); Russell Braun; Adriana Braun	Walter Babiak; Studio Arts Orchestra, Toronto	"Mozart's Magic Fantasy: A Journey Through 'The Magic Flute'" Cassette Tape, Classical Kids; ISBN 1-895404-04-5; Later released on CD	Story adaptation by Douglas Cowling, produced by Susan Hammond; Also features Tracey Moore as Sarah and Richard Binsley as the dragon, Sarastro, and a stagehand
1991	Jerry Hadley; Barbara Hendricks; Robert Lloyd; June Anderson; Thomas Allen; Ulrike Steinsky	Charles Mackerras; Scottish Chamber Orchestra and chorus	CD (2): Telarc 2CD80727; Released December 2008	
1992	Kurt Streit; Barbara Bonney; Kristinn Sigmundsson; Sumi Jo; Gilles Cachemaille; Lilian Watson	Arnold Östman; Drottingholm Court Theatre Orchestra and Chorus	CD (2): Decca Operas 4783443; Released February 2012	
1993	Herbert Lippert; Elizabeth Norberg-Schulz; Kurt Rydl; Hellen Kwon; Georg Tichy; Lotte Leitner	Michael Halász; Failoni Orchestra, Hungarian Festival Chorus	CD (2): Naxos Opera Classics 8660030-31	
1995	Michael Schade; Christiane Oelze; Harrie Peeters; Cyndia Sieden; Gerald Finley; Constanze Backes	John Eliot Gardiner; English Baroque Soloists, Monteverdi Choir	CD (2): DG Archiv E4491662	
1995	Hans Peter Blochwitz; Rosa Mannion; Reinhard Hagen; Natalie Dessay; Anton Scharinger; Linda Kitchen	William Christie; Les Arts Florissants	CD (2): Erato 2564677426	
2004	Cristoph Genz; Suzie LeBlanc; Cornelius Hauptmann; Isolde Siebert; Stephan Genz; Marie Kuijken	Sigiswald Kuijken; La Petite Bande	SACD (3): Amati - ami 2301/3	
2005	Barry Banks; Rebecca Evans; John Tomlinson; Elizabeth Vidal; Simon Keenlyside; Lesley Garrett	Charles Mackerras; London Philharmonic Orchestra with the Geoffrey Mitchell Choir	CD (2): Chandos CHAN 3121	
2005	Christoph Strehl; Dorothea Röschmann; René Pape; Erika Miklósa; Hanno Müller-Brachmann	Claudio Abbado; Mahler Chamber Orchestra and Arnold Schönberg Chor	CD (2): DG 4775789	
2009	Daniel Behle; Marlis Petersen; Marcos Fink; Anna-Kristiina Kaappola; Daniel Schmutzhard; Sunhae Im	René Jacobs; RIAS Kammerchor; Akademie für Alte Musik Berlin	CD (3); HMC 902 068 70	Almost-complete original libretto

=== Video ===
Year	Cast (Tamino; Pamina; Sarastro; Queen of the Night; Papageno; Pagagena)	Conductor, opera house and/or orchestral and choral forces	Label information	Notes
1964	Waldemar Kmentt; Pilar Lorengar; Walter Kreppel; Roberta Peters; Walter Berry; Renate Holm	István Kertész; Vienna State Opera and Philharmonic	DVD: VAI 4520; Released June 2010	Recording of a performance at the Salzburg Festival (1964)
1968	Peter Schreier; Helen Donath; Theo Adam; Sylvia Geszty; Günther Leib; Renate Hoff	Otmar Suitner; Dresdner Staatskapelle und Leipziger Rundfunkchor Chor	DVD: DG Unitel 0734106; Released November 2005	
1971	Nicolai Gedda; Edith Mathis; Hans Sotin; Cristina Deutekom; William Workman; Carol Malone	Horst Stein; Philharmonische Staatsorchester Hamburg und Chor der Hamburgischen Staatsoper	DVD: Arthaus Musik; Released 2007	A film, with the singers lip-synching a previously-sung recording
1975	Josef Köstlinger; Irma Urrila; Ulrik Cold; Birgit Nordin; Håkan Hagegård; Elisabeth Erikson	Eric Ericson; Swedish Radio Symphony Orchestra and Swedish Radio Choir; Film directed by Ingmar Bergman	DVD: Criterion #71; SVT/Svensk Filmindustri 532242	A film, with the singers lip-synching a previously-sung recording (see above and The Magic Flute (1975 film))
1978	Leo Goeke; Felicity Lott; Thomas Thomaschke; May Sandoz; Benjamin Luxon; Elisabeth Conquet	Bernard Haitink; London Philharmonic Orchestra, Glyndebourne Festival Chorus	DVD: Arthaus Musik 101085; Released June 2004	
1980	Peter Schreier; Magdalena Falewicz; Siegfried Vogel; Isabella Nawe; Jürgen Freier	Otmar Suitner; Berlin State Opera Chorus and Orchestra	?	A video performance given in Japan; sung in German with Japanese subtitles
1982	Peter Schreier; Ileana Cotrubaș; Martti Talvela; Edita Gruberová; Christian Boesch; Gudrun Sieber	James Levine; Wiener Philharmoniker and Wiener Staatsopernchor	DVD: Arthaus Musik 107199; Released October 2011	
1983	Francisco Araiza; Lucia Popp; Kurt Moll; Edita Gruberová; Wolfgang Brendel; Gudrun Sieber	Wolfgang Sawallisch; Bayerische Staatsoper orchestra and chorus	DVD: DG 0734106; Released 2005	Recorded at the Bavarian State Opera 19–20 September 1983
1991	Francisco Araiza; Kathleen Battle; Kurt Moll; Luciana Serra; Manfred Hemm; Barbara Kilduff	James Levine, Metropolitan Opera orchestra and chorus	DVD: DG 073 003-9; Released 2000	Recorded at the New York Met, February 1991
1992	Deon van der Walt; Ulrike Sonntag; Cornelius Hauptmann; Andrea Frei; Thomas Mohr; Patricia Rozario	Wolfgang Gönnenwein; Ludwigsburger Festspiele	DVD: Arthaus Musik 100188	Recorded at the Ludwigsburg Festival, August 1992
2000	Piotr Beczała; Malin Hartelius; Matti Salminen; Elena Moșuc; Anton Scharinger; Julia Neumann	Franz Welser-Möst; Zürich Opera House orchestra and chorus	DVD: TDK – DVOPMF	
2000	Piotr Beczała; Dorothea Röschmann; Matti Salminen; Desirée Rancatore; Detlef Roth; Gaële Le Roi	Iván Fischer; Opéra National de Paris	DVD: Arthaus Musik 107233 Released February 2011	Recorded at the Palais Garnier, Paris, December 2000
2003	Will Hartmann; Dorothea Röschmann; Franz-Josef Selig; Diana Damrau; Simon Keenlyside; Kathleen Tynan	Colin Davis; Royal Opera House, Covent Garden directed by David McVicar	Blu-ray: Opus Arte OABD7002D; DVD: Opus Arte OAHD5002D	Recorded at the Royal Opera House, Covent Garden, 27 January 2003
2006	Paul Groves; Genia Kühmeier; René Pape; Diana Damrau; Christian Gerhaher; Irena Bespalovaite	Riccardo Muti; Wiener Philharmoniker and Konzertvereinigung Wiener Staatsopernchor staged by Pierre Audi, directed by Brian Large	DVD: Decca	Recorded at the Salzburg Festival, August 2006
2007	Christoph Strehl; Julia Kleiter; Matti Salminen; Elena Moșuc; Ruben Drole; Eva Liebau	Nikolaus Harnoncourt; Zürich Opera House orchestra and chorus	DVD: DG 00440 073 4367	
2020	David Portillo, Sofia Fomina, Brindley Sherratt, Caroline Wettergreen	Ryan Wigglesworth; Orchestra of the Age of Enlightenment, Glyndebourne Festival Chorus	DVD:Opus Arte Cat:OABD7268D	
