= 1975 in Nordic music =

The following is a list of notable events and releases that happened in Scandinavian music in 1975.

== Events ==
- 22 March – The Eurovision Song Contest is held in Stockholm, Sweden, following ABBA's win the previous year, and is won by Dutch group Teach-In with the song "Ding-A-Dong". Finland is the best-performing of the Scandinavian countries, finishing in 7th place. Sweden finish 8th and Norway 18th.
- 17 June – Aulis Sallinen's opera, The Horseman, is premièred at the Savonlinna Opera Festival to celebrate the 500th anniversary of Olavinlinna Castle. According to George Loomis, writing in The New York Times, the work "is widely credited for helping to precipitate a wave of Finnish operas".

== New works ==
- Ulf Grahn – Hommage to the Soap Opera
- Einojuhani Rautavaara – String Quartet No. 4
- Aulis Sallinen – The Horseman (opera)

== Top hit singles ==
- ABBA
  - "Mamma Mia" (#1 Denmark, Sweden)
  - "SOS" (#1 Australia, Belgium, NZ, South Africa, West Germany)
- Benny Borg – "Arven" (#1 Norway)
- Harpo – "Moviestar" (#1 Austria, Denmark, Norway, Switzerland, Sweden, West Germany)
- Björn Skifs – "Michelangelo" (#1 Sweden; #7 Norway)

== Hit albums ==
- ABBA – ABBA (#1 Australia, Norway, Sweden)
- Gasolin' – Gas 5
- Kjell Vidars – Kjell Vidars Igjen... (#12 Sweden)
- Kebnekajse – Kebnekajse III
- Popol Ace – Stolen From Time
- Inger Lise Rypdal – Feeling

== Eurovision Song Contest ==
- Finland in the Eurovision Song Contest 1975
- Norway in the Eurovision Song Contest 1975
- Sweden in the Eurovision Song Contest 1975

== Film and television music ==
- Bent Fabricius-Bjerre – Flåklypa Grand Prix
- Jojje Wadenius – Kalles klätterträd

== Musical films ==
- The Magic Flute, with music by Wolfgang Amadeus Mozart, starring Irma Urrila, Josef Köstlinger and Håkan Hagegård

== Births ==
- 23 April – Jónsi, Icelandic vocalist and multi-instrumentalist
- 9 October – Anders Göthberg, Swedish guitarist (died 2008
- unknown date – Áki Ásgeirsson, Icelandic composer

== Deaths ==
- 5 February – Åke Persson, Swedish jazz trombonist (born 1932; drowned)
- 24 August – Brita Bratland, Norwegian traditional folk singer (born 1910)

== See also ==
- 1975 in Denmark
- 1975 in Iceland
- 1975 in Norwegian music
- 1975 in Sweden
