= Arnold Östman =

Swedish conductor and music director (1939–2023)

- Born: 24 December 1939; Malmö, Sweden
- Died: 15 August 2023 (aged 83)
- Occupation: Conductor
- Years active: 1971–2023

Arnold Otto Natanael Östman (24 December 1939 – 15 August 2023) was a Swedish conductor and music director.

== Early life ==
Arnold Östman was born in Malmö, Sweden. He studied art history and musicology at Lund, Paris and Stockholm. As a musician, he concentrated on the piano and the harpsichord, being largely self-taught. During his years as a researcher, he focused on the subject of early opera, bringing to light a number of theretofore unknown or little-known baroque operas.

Östman was a teacher at the University College of Opera (then called the Statens musikdramatiska skola) in 1969. He was theatre and museum director at the Drottningholms Teatermuseum (later known as Sveriges Teatermuseum) in Stockholm starting in 1979.

== Conducting career ==
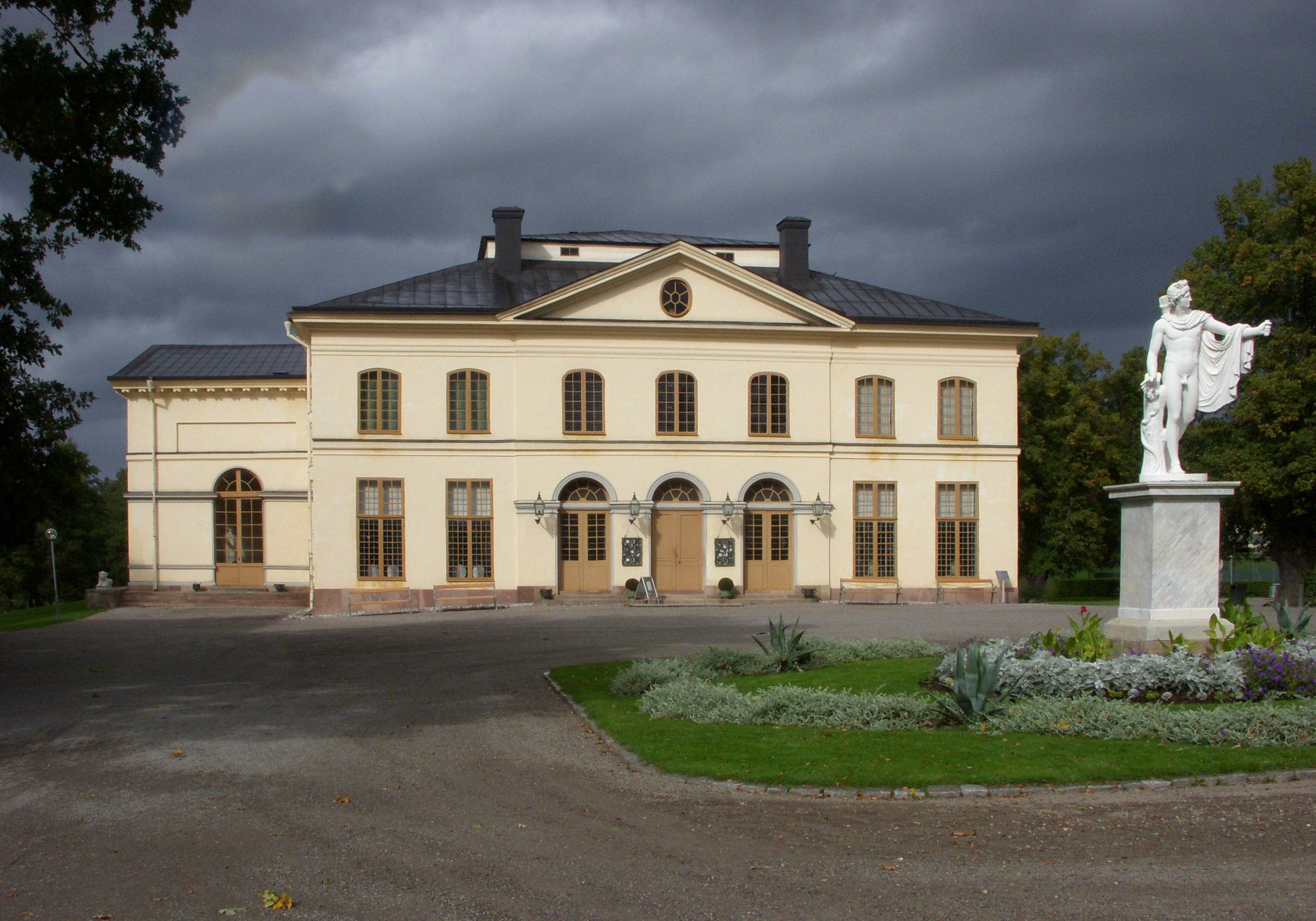
Drottningholm Palace Theatre

Östman was artistic director and conductor of the Vadstena Academy from 1971 until 1981, while also serving as conductor and artistic director of the NorrlandsOperan in Umeå from 1974 until 1978.

Östman was made artistic director of the Drottningholm Palace Theatre in 1980 and remained in that role until 1992. He gained an international reputation as a champion of the period performance movement in classical music, a movement that insists on the performance of repertoire from c. 1600 to 1820 (i.e., baroque, classical, and early romantic) using instruments (or modern replicas), techniques, and stylistic sensibilities from the appropriate period. In particular, Drottningholm's productions of Mozart operas with period instruments caused a considerable stir in the early days of the historical-performance movement. To Östman, use of historically appropriate instruments is vital to developing an understanding of the Mozartian style:

It's so important to use classical instruments. We make mistakes with them, but we keep trying because it is really important complementary information, which has a scientific value. Yet we don't use it as Scientists, we use it for artistic freedom. The more information you have, the more freedom you have.

Outside Sweden, Östman conducted a wide range of repertoire at the opera houses of Covent Garden, Vienna, Parma, Trieste, Cologne, Bonn, Toulouse, Nice, Wexford, Madrid, Washington, Lausanne, Paris (Garnier and Bastille) and at the Schwetzingen and Vienna Festivals, among others.

As a symphonic conductor, Östman worked with many major European orchestras, including the German radio orchestras in Hamburg, Frankfurt, Cologne, Stuttgart and Baden-Baden; the Gürzenich Orchestra Cologne; the Freiburg Baroque Orchestra; the Orchestre Philharmonique de Radio France; the Orchestre National de France; the Academy of Ancient Music; the Geneva Chamber Orchestra; the Royal Concertgebouw Orchestra of Amsterdam, the Netherlands’ Radio Chamber Orchestra, the Scottish Chamber Orchestra, the Gothenburg Symphony, the Oslo Philharmonic, the Mahler Chamber Orchestra, the Rotterdam Philharmonic Orchestra and the Philharmoniker Hamburg.

== Death ==
Arnold Östman died on 15 August 2023, at the age of 83.

== Operatic recordings (audio) ==
Composer	Work	Soloists	Chorus	Orchestra	Date	Notes
Mozart	Così fan tutte	Rachel Yakar (Fiordiligi); Alicia Nafé (Dorabella); Gösta Winbergh (Ferrando); Tom Krause (Guglielmo); Georgine Resick (Despina); Carlos Feller (Don Alfonso)	Drottningholm Court Theatre Chorus	Drottningholm Court Theatre Orchestra (on authentic instruments)	1985	L'Oiseau-Lyre, 3 discs
Mozart	Le nozze di Figaro	Arleen Auger (Countess); Håkan Hagegård (Count); Petteri Salomaa (Figaro); Barbara Bonney (Susanna); Della Jones (Cherubino); Alicia Nafé (Cherubino); Carlos Feller (Bartolo); Della Jones (Marcellina)	Drottningholm Court Theatre Chorus	Drottningholm Court Theatre Orchestra (on authentic instruments)	1988	L'Oiseau-Lyre, 3 discs, 186 minutes
Mozart	Don Giovanni	Håkan Hagegård (Don Giovanni); Arleen Auger (Donna Anna); Barbara Bonney (Zerlina); Della Jones (Donna Elvira); Gilles Cachemaille (Leporello); Bryn Terfel (Masetto); Kristinn Sigmundsson (Commendatore); Nico van der Meel (Don Ottavio)	Drottningholm Court Theatre Chorus	Drottningholm Court Theatre Orchestra (on authentic instruments)	1990	L'Oiseau-Lyre, 3 discs, 171 minutes
Mozart	Die Zauberflöte	Barbara Bonney (Pamina); Kurt Streit (Tamino); Gilles Cachemaille (Papageno); Sumi Jo (Queen of the Night); Kristinn Sigmundsson (Sarastro); Håkan Hagegård (Speaker); Martin Petzold (Monostatos); Lillian Watson (Papagena)	Drottningholm Court Theatre Chorus	Drottningholm Court Theatre Orchestra (on authentic instruments)	1990	L'Oiseau-Lyre, 2 discs
Gluck	Orfeo ed Euridice	Ann-Christine Biel (Orfeo); Maya Boog (Euridice); Kerstin Avemo (Amore)	Drottningholm Court Theatre Chorus	Drottningholm Court Theatre Orchestra (on authentic instruments)	1998	Naxos, 1 disc, 67 minutes. Vienna (1762) version.
Gluck	Alceste	Teresa Ringholz (Alcestis); Justin Lavender (Admetus); Jonas Degerfelt (Evander); Miriam Treichl (Ismene); Lars Martinsson (Herald; Voice of Apollo)	Drottningholm Court Theatre Chorus	Drottningholm Court Theatre Orchestra (on authentic instruments)	1999	Naxos, 3 discs, 147 minutes

== Operatic recordings (video) ==
Composer	Work	Soloists	Director	Orchestra	Date	Notes
Mozart	Le nozze di Figaro	Per-Arne Wahlgren (Count); Sylvia Lindenstrand (Countess); Georgine Resick (Susanna); Mikael Samuelson (Figaro); Ann Christine Biel (Cherubino); Erik Saedén (Dottor Bartolo)	Thomas Olofsson (video); Göran Järvefelt	Drottningholm Court Theatre Orchestra	1981	Studio: Image Entertainment. 179 minutes
Mozart	Così fan tutte	Ann Christine Biel (Fiordiligi); Maria Höglind (Dorabella); Lars Tibell (Ferrando); Magnus Lindén (Guglielmo); Ulla Severin (Despina); Enzo Florimo (Don Alfonso)	Thomas Olofsson (video); Willy Decker (stage)	Drottningholm Court Theatre Orchestra	1984	Arthaus Musik, 160 minutes.
Handel	Agrippina	Günter von Kannen (Claudio); Barbara Daniels (Agrippina); David Kuebler (Nerone); Janice Hall (Poppea)	Thomas Olofsson (video); Michael Hampe (stage)	London Baroque Players	1985	Euroarts, 150 minutes
Mozart	La clemenza di Tito	Stefan Dahlberg (Tito); Lani Poulson (Sesto); Anita Soldh (Vitellia ) Pia-Marie Nilsson (Servilla)	Thomas Olofsson (video); Göran Järvefelt (stage)	Drottningholm Court Theatre Orchestra	1987	Arthaus Musik, 127 minutes
Mozart	Don Giovanni	Håkan Hagegård (Don Giovanni); Helena Döse (Donna Anna); Anita Soldh (Zerlina); Birgit Nordin (Donna Elvira); Erik Saedén (Leporello); Tord Wallström (Masetto); Bengt Rundgren (Commendatore); Gösta Winbergh (Don Ottavio)	Thomas Olofsson (video); Göran Järvefelt (stage)	Drottningholm Court Theatre Orchestra	1987	Virgin Video. 186 minutes
Mozart	La finta giardiniera	Stuart Kale (Don Anchise); Britt-Marie Aruhn (Sandrina); Richard Croft (Comte Belfiore); Eva Pilat (Arminda); Annika Skoglund (Ramiro); Ann Christine Biel (Serpetta); Petteri Salomaa (Nardo)	Thomas Olofsson (video); Göran Järvefelt (stage)	Drottningholm Court Theatre Orchestra	1988	Kultur Video. 149 minutes
Mozart	Die Zauberflöte	Ann Christine Biel (Pamina); Stefan Dahlberg (Tamino); Mikael Samuelson (Papageno); Birgit Louise Frandsen (Queen of the Night); László Polgár (Zarastro); Petteri Salomaa (Speaker); Magnus Khyle (Monostatos); Birgitta Larsson (Papagena)	Thomas Olofsson (video); Göran Järvefelt (stage)	Drottningholm Court Theatre Orchestra	1989	Image Entertainment, 160 minutes
Mozart	Die Entführung aus dem Serail	Aga Winska (Konstanze); Marianne Hellström (Blonde); Richard Croft (Belmonte); Bengt-Ola Morgny (Pedrillo); Tamás Szüle (Osmin); Emmerich Schäffer (Selima Pasha)	Thomas Olofsson (video); Harald Clemen (stage)	Drottningholm Court Theatre Orchestra	1989	Kultur Video, 133 minutes
Mozart	Idomeneo	Stuart Kale (Idomeneo); David Kuebler (Idamante); Ann Christine Biel (Ilia); Anita Soldh (Elettra); Jan-Erik Jakobsson (Arbace)	Thomas Olofsson (video); Michael Hampe (stage)	Drottningholm Court Theatre Orchestra	1991	Arthaus Musik, 142 minutes
Antonio Salieri	Falstaff	John Del Carlo (John Falstaff); Teresa Ringholz (Mrs. Ford); Richard Croft (Mr. Ford); Delores Ziegler (Mrs. Slender); Jake Gardner (Mr. Slender)	Agnes Meth (video); Michael Hampe (stage)	Stuttgart Radio Symphony Orchestra	1995	Arthaus Musik, 144 minutes

== Awards and recognition ==
Arnold Östman was awarded the newspaper Expressen's Spelmannen in 1974. He was awarded an honorary doctorate at Umeå University in 1979 and he is a Chevalier of the Legion of Honour. He was awarded the Litteris et Artibus 1990 and was elected to the Royal Swedish Academy of Music 14 May 1992. In 2010 he was awarded the H. M. The King's Medal, "for significant contributions to Swedish music".
