= Birgit Nordin =

Swedish operatic soprano (1934–2022)

- Birgit Nordin as the Queen of the Night, during filming of The Magic Flute
- Born: 22 February 1934; Sangis, Sweden
- Died: 7 April 2022 (aged 88)
- Occupation: Operatic soprano
- Years active: 1958–1986
- Organization: Royal Swedish Opera
- Title: Hovsångerska (1973)
- Spouse: Jerker Arvidson (m. 1977; died 2007)

Birgit Nordin (22 February 1934 – 7 April 2022) was a Swedish operatic soprano. She was a member of the Royal Swedish Opera from 1958 to 1986, and regularly appeared at the Drottningholm Festival where she performed twelve major Mozart roles, including Susanna in Le nozze di Figaro and Pamina in The Magic Flute. She also performed internationally, appearing in the Edinburgh International Festival, Glyndebourne Festival, Copenhagen and others. She became known as the Queen of the Night in Trollflöjten, Ingmar Bergman's film adaptation of Mozart's opera.

== Life and career ==
Born in Sangis, Norrbotten, Nordin attended school in Haparanda. She attended the Royal College of Music in Stockholm from 1956 to 1958, studying under Britta von Vegesack. Later she trained with Lina Pagliughi in Italy.

Nordin joined the company of the Royal Swedish Opera in Stockholm, where she worked from 1958 to 1986. Her debut was as Oscar in Verdi's Masked Ball on 21 October 1958 and she was part of the company that visited London and the Edinburgh International Festival in 1960. Starting in 1960, she regularly appeared at the Drottningholm Festival where she performed twelve major Mozart roles, including Susanna in Le nozze di Figaro and Pamina in The Magic Flute. In 1968, she participated in the world premiere of Franz Berwald's Drottningen av Golconda, with Elisabeth Söderström in the title role.

Abroad, Nordin appeared at the 1968 Glyndebourne Festival as Blonde in Mozart's Die Entführung aus dem Serail. She performed the role of Jenny Smith in Rise and Fall of the City of Mahagonny in Copenhagen in 1970, and appeared on Danish television as Lulu, also singing in Bach's St Matthew Passion in Berlin that year. Other roles included Gilda in Verdi's Rigoletto, Rosina in Rossini's Il barbiere di Siviglia and Mélisande in Debussy's Pelléas et Mélisande.

Nordin held the Christina Nilsson Fellowship twice, and was appointed a Hovsångerska (court singer) in 1973. She appeared in the 1975 film Trollflöjten, Ingmar Bergman's film adaption of Mozart's opera The Magic Flute sung in Swedish, as the Queen of the Night.

After retiring from the stage, Nordin undertook some teaching and stage direction.

=== Private life ===
Since 1977, Nordin was married to the Swedish bass–baritone Jerker Arvidson (1939–2007).

She died on 7 April 2022 at age 88.

== Recordings ==
- Lars-Erik Larsson: Förklädd Gud = (God in disguise) : lyric suite, op. 24; Symphony No. 3 in C minor, op. 34 (in Swedish), Bis, 1989, OCLC 25890100
- Monteverdi: Geistliche Konzerte, Archiv Produktion, 1973, OCLC 955615313
- Verdi: Rigoletto, Naxos Digital Services Ltd., 2005, OCLC 594082648
- Carl Michael Bellman (in Swedish), EMI, 1983, OCLC 13225300
- Laci Boldemann: Lieder der Vergänglichkeit, opus 8; Epitaphs, opus 10; Notturno, opus 14, HMV, OCLC 900326417
- Moses Pergament: Den judiska sången, Caprice, OCLC 459267228

=== Compilations ===
- Svensk operaantologi. Sida 17. Sida 17 (in Swedish), EMI Svenska AB, 1976, OCLC 11489821
- Svensk operaantologi. Sida 18. Sida 18 (in Swedish), EMI Svenska AB, 1976, OCLC 11489839
- Mozart at the Royal Swedish Opera, 1952–1957 (in Swedish), Caprice Records, 2006, OCLC 811334216

=== Video ===
- Bergman, Ingmar; Schikaneder, Emanuel; Cold, Ulrik; Urrila, Irma; Hagegård, Håkan; Erikson, Elisabeth; Köstlinger, Josef; Sædén, Erik; Nordin, Birgit; Nykvist, Sven; Lundgren, Siv, Trollflöjten [The Magic Flute], [United States]: The Criterion Collection, ISBN 978-1-68143-557-2, OCLC 1083532495
