= The Sound of Music (1988 cast album) =

- Telarc CD, CD-80162

Studio album by Erich Kunzel
- Released: 1988
- Studio: Cincinnati Music Hall
- Genres: Musical theatre and crossover
- Length: 70:00
- Languages: English and Latin
- Label: Telarc
- Producer: Robert Woods

The Sound of Music is a 70-minute studio album of Richard Rodgers's and Oscar Hammerstein's 1959 musical, starring Frederica von Stade, Håkan Hagegård and Eileen Farrell, performed with the Cincinnati Pops Orchestra under the direction of Erich Kunzel. It was released in 1988.

== Background ==
The album presents a version of the score of the musical not previously recorded, including the numbers "I have confidence in me" and "Something good" that Rodgers composed for Robert Wise's 1965 The Sound of Music film, as well as the number "An ordinary couple" that Wise discarded. The "Nature music" that opens the album is a première recording.

== Recording ==
The album was digitally recorded on 13–14 December 1987 in Cincinnati Music Hall.

== Cover art ==
The LP, cassette and CD issues of the album all use the same cover, designed by Liggett-Stashower under the art direction of Ray Kirschensteiner. The photograph of Alpine scenery on the front of the album was taken by Ric Ergenbright. The photograph of von Stade and the album's child performers on the back of the cover was taken by David Katzell.

== Critical reception ==
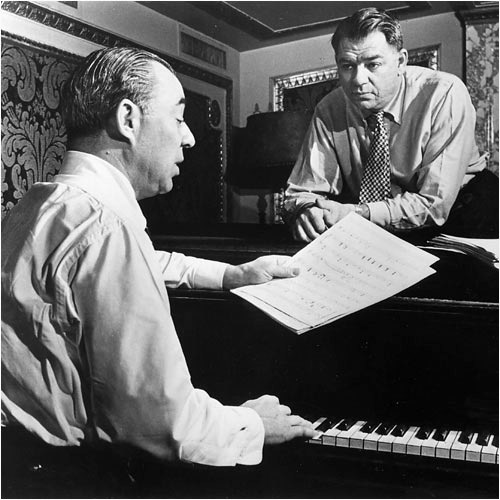
Richard Rodgers åleft) and Oscar Hammerstein II in 1945, fourteen years before The Sound of Music was first staged

Adrian Edwards reviewed the album on CD in Gramophone in December 1988. The last musical that Rodgers and Hammerstein had created together was greatly beloved, he wrote, but it had never before been made available on disc in a version as all-encompassing as Erich Kunzel's. As well as presenting the musical's theatrical score in its entirety, Kunzel's album included the additional numbers that Rodgers had composed for Robert Wise's much garlanded 1965 movie. (Rodgers wrote his new numbers' lyrics as well as their music, Hammerstein having died in 1960.)

The first of these, "I have confidence in me", was sung by Julie Andrews in the sequence following Maria's journey from her nunnery to her new home in the von Trapp family's villa. The second, "Something good", was a duet for Andrews to sing with Christopher Plummer's Baron instead of a number that Wise had rejected, "An ordinary couple". Edwards had previously thought the latter rather "commonplace", and he had been surprised to find that it was one of the tracks on Kunzel's disc that he most enjoyed. It had been improved by the addition of "a charming little verse never before recorded", and further enhanced by "the mellow duetting of [Frederica] von Stade and Håkan Hagegård", "with the strings of the Cincinnati Pops providing a lovely velvet-like sheen as a backdrop". Hagegård was good, too, in a "prettily" sung "Edelweiss".

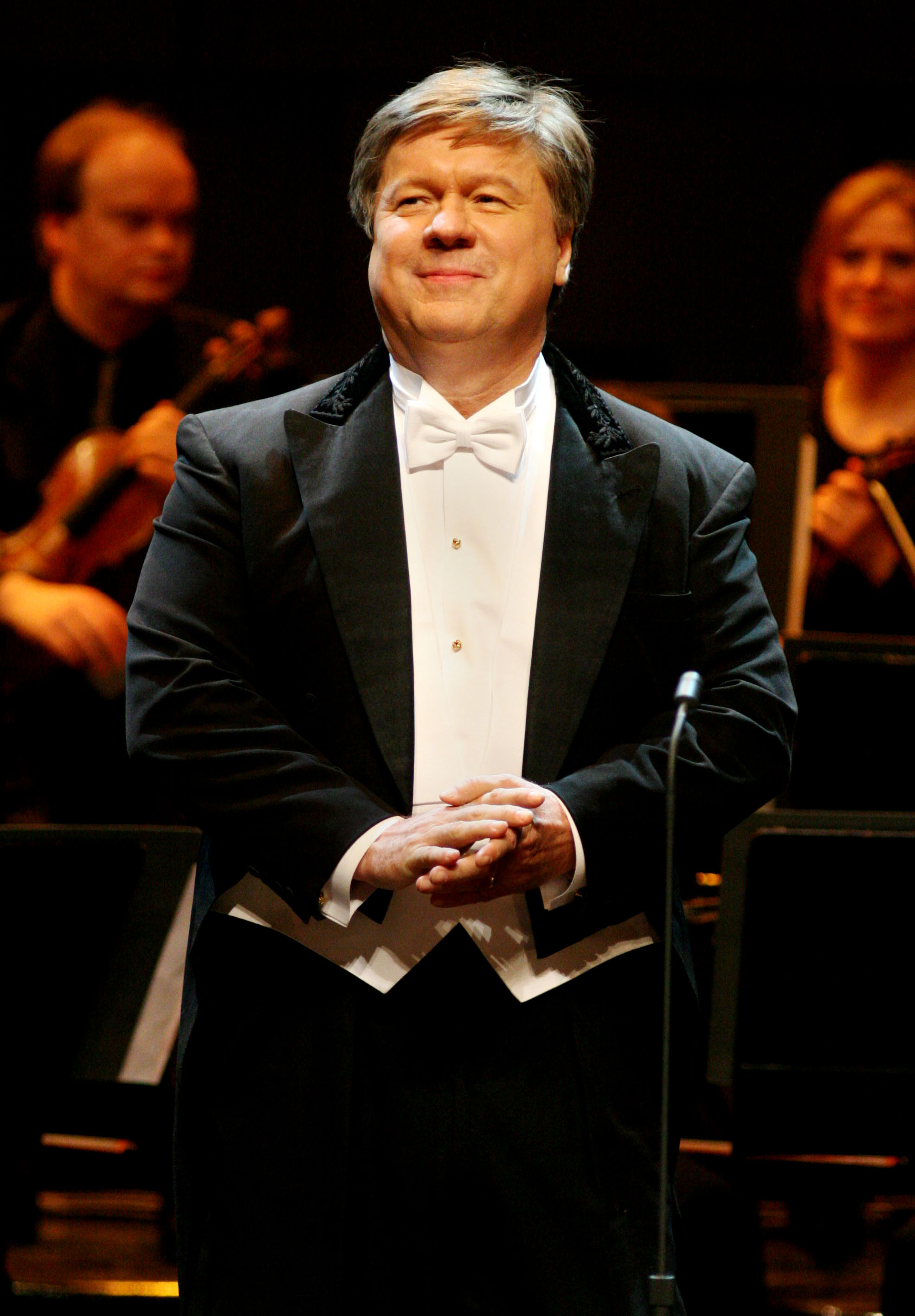
Håkan Hagegård in 2005 (courtesy of the Polar Music Prize)

As the Mother Abbess, Eileen Farrell was strong and assured in "Climb ev'ry mountain", "that solo that's an open invitation to sing flat", making it seem all the stranger that she had been denied her rightful place duetting with Maria in "My favorite things". The children cast as the young von Trapps sang cheerfully, and Telarc's engineering was of audiophile grade - the entry of the church organ in "Processional" was "designed to raise the roof". The album's only weakness lay in the contribution made to it by its leading lady. Von Stade was fine in some of her music, "but when high spirits and some enthusiasm are required, this Maria sounds just world-weary."

Roy Hemming reviewed the album on CD in Stereo Review in January 1989. It demonstrated, he wrote, that it was possible to "breathe fresh life into the score of a major Broadway musical" by entrusting it to a judiciously chosen crossover cast, a US symphony orchestra and a top-class conductor. Erich Kunzel had presented collectors with the most complete edition of The Sound of Music that had ever appeared on the shelves of a record shop. His CD included every note of Richard Rodgers's stage score, even including some interludes that had been omitted from the original cast recording, as well as the extra music that Rodgers had composed for Julie Andrews's movie.

The singer in Andrews's shoes was Frederica von Stade, "a wonderfully warm and vocally glowing Maria" who seemed entirely at home in her sabbatical from opera (except when she was called upon to yodel in "The lonely goatherd"). The veteran Eileen Farrell was "genuinely thrilling" in "Climb ev'ry mountain", sounding in better voice than she had done for many years. Håkan Hagegård and Barbara Daniels were both excellent too. Erich Kunzel conducted "with the right mixture of bounce, bite and romantic sentimentality." Telarc's engineers had created a variety of acoustics appropriate to the musical's different environments. The organ in the wedding scene and the finale would "blow your socks off". All in all, the disc was an impressive recording of a radiant performance.

The album was also discussed in Fanfare, Opera, Michael Patrick Kennedy and John Muir's Collins guide to musicals and Michael Portaniere and Jerry Herman's The Theatermania Guide to Musical Theater Recordings.

== CD track listing ==
Richard Rodgers (1902–1979)

The Sound of Music, lyrics by Oscar Hammerstein II (1895-1960), book by Howard Lindsay (1889-1968) and Russel Crouse (1893-1966), suggested by The Story of the Trapp Family Singers by Maria Augusta Trapp (1905–1987)

- 1.1 (1:02) Nature music, Orchestra
- 1.2 (1:38) "The sound of music", Maria
- 2 (0:14) The Abbey bells
- 3 (1:00) "Mono chant", Sister Bertha, Chorus of nuns
- 4 (0:57) "Morning hymn", Chorus of nuns
- 5 (0:08) "Angelus bells", Chorus of nuns
- 6 (0:46) "Alleluia", Chorus of nuns
- 7 (3:03) "Maria", Mother Abbess, Sister Bertha, Sister Sophia, Sister Margaretta
- 8 (2:27) "My favorite things", Maria
- 9 (3:25) "I have confidence in me", Maria
- 10 (5:29) "Do-re-mi", Maria, Children
- 11 (4:42) "Sixteen going on seventeen", Rolf, Liesl
- 12 (3:02) "The lonely goatherd", Maria, Children
- 13 (2:46) "How can love survive", Max, Elsa
- 14 (3:19) Reprise: "The sound of music", Maria, Georg, Children
- 15.1 (0:59) The party scene, Orchestra
- 15.2 (0:25) Grand waltz, Orchestra
- 15.3 (0:33) Ländler, Orchestra
- 16 (2:48) "So long, farewell", Children
- 17 (3:22) "Climb ev'ry mountain", Mother Abbess
- 18 (2:55) "No way to stop it", Elsa, Max, Georg
- 19 (4:10) "An ordinary couple", Maria, Georg
- 20 (3:00) "Something good", Maria, Georg
- 21.1 (1:11) "Processional", Organ, Chorus
- 21.2 (1:47) "Confitemini Domino", Chorus of nuns
- 21.3 (0:41) "Alleluia", Chorus of nuns
- 22 (2:05) Reprise: "Sixteen going on seventeen", Maria, Liesl
- 23 (1:18) Reprise: "Do-re-mi", Maria, Georg, Children
- 24 (2:25) "Edelweiss", Georg
- 25 (1:52) Reprise: "So long, farewell", Maria, Georg, Children
- 26 (1:45) Reprise: "Climb ev'ry mountain", Mother Abbess, Chorus

== Personnel ==
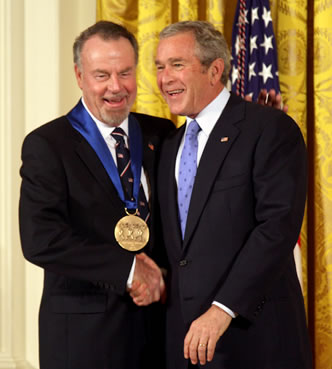
Erich Kunzel (left) receiving the National Medal of Arts from President George W. Bush in 2006

=== Musical ===
- Frederica von Stade, Maria
- Håkan Hagegård, Captain Baron Georg von Trapp
- Eileen Farrell (1920–2002), Mother Abbess
- Barbara Daniels, Elsa Schraeder
- Lewis Dahle von Schlanbusch, Max Detweiler
- Neil Jones, Rolf Gruber
- Kimberley Barber, Sister Sophia
- Sandra Graham, Sister Margaretta
- Janet Stubbs, Sister Bertha
- The Children:
  - Jeanne Menke, Liesl
  - Devon Biere, Friedrich
  - Michelle Kear, Louisa
  - Vincent Lee, Kurt
  - Heather McFadden, Brigitta
  - Heather Harpenau, Marta
  - Lauren Frederick, Gretl
- May Festival Chorus
- John Leman, chorus director
- Robert Muckenfuss, organ
- Paul Patterson, guitar
- Cincinnati Pops Orchestra
- Erich Kunzel (1935–2009), conductor

=== Other ===
- Robert Woods, producer
- Jack Renner, engineer
- Michael Bishop, technical assistant
- Thomas Knab, technical assistant and editor
- Rosalind Ilett, editor
- Elaine Martone, editor

== Release history ==
In 1988, Telarc released the album on LP (catalogue number DG-10162), cassette (catalogue number CS-30162) and CD (catalogue number CD-80162). The CD was accompanied by a 20-page insert booklet offering biographies of the principal artists and a detailed history and synopsis of the musical by Allen Cohen, all in English only.
