= Henny Noremark =

- Born: 23 May 1942 (age 84)
- Occupations: Production designer, costume designer

Henny Gunilla Noremark (born 23 May 1942) is a Swedish production designer and costume designer. She was co-nominated with Karin Erskine for the Academy Award for Best Costume Design for their work on Ingmar Bergman's 1975 film The Magic Flute.

== Career ==
Henny Gunilla Noremark was born in Järvsö 23 May 1942. She attended Konstfack in Stockholm from 1960 to 1965 and received extensive artistic training there. Henny Noremark then received further training in production design at Swedish television in 1967–68 and further training at the same place as a producer in 1970–71. Finally, she rounded off her training in 1980–1982 with a course in film and television directing at Dramatiska institutet in Stockholm.

Noremark began working as a costume and set designer on the 1970 series Söderkåkar while still training for Swedish television. Her next television job brought her together with Sweden's star director Ingmar Bergman in 1974: Noremark also designed both the costumes and the scenery for his production of Mozart's Magic Flute. Noremark received an Oscar nomination for the first performance in 1976, together with Karin Erskine. After 1977, Noremark concentrated on her work as a film architect and remained active in this area until the late 2000s, without specific individual achievements particularly standing out.

Noremark also supervised various theatrical productions, including the plays Siri Brahe, Hur andra älskar, Gröna hissen, Immanuel Kant's sista dagar and Shakespeare's A Midsummer Night's Dream, both as a costume and set designer. Exhibitions of her designs can be seen in the Judiska Museet, Stockholm (permanent exhibition), the Graphics Hus, Mariefred, and in the Konstakademien (Art Academy) in Stockholm.
