= Karin Erskine =

Swedish costume designer (born 1945)

- Born: Karin Elizabeth Erskine; February 26, 1945 (age 81); Stockholm, Sweden
- Occupation: Costume designer
- Years active: 1971-2008

Karin Erskine (born February 26, 1945) is a Swedish costume designer. She was co-nominated with Henny Noremark for the Academy Award for Best Costume Design for their work on Ingmar Bergman's 1975 film The Magic Flute.

== Biography ==
Erskine was born in the Lovö församling district of Stockholm. She attended art school in Stockholm and worked at the National Theater (Old Vic Theatre) and for the BBC in London. Then she became a freelance costume designer. She worked for film and television, opera and theatre.

Erskine was responsible for the costume design in Ingrid Bergman's musical film The Magic Flute. In 1976 she received an Oscar nomination in the category Best Costume Design together with Henny Noremark (*1942).

Erskine twice represented Sweden in the Prague Quadrennial (PQ), an international scenography competition in Prague. In 1999 she designed the costumes for A Dream Play, an exhibition honoring August Strindberg. In 2003, along with Lars-Ake Thessman, who designed the sets, she won the PQ Gold Medal in the Complex realization of a single production category. Her room production of the play Elektra was awarded.

Erskine's current work includes costume design for the operas L'incoronazione di Poppea at Stockholm's Drottningholms Slottsteater (2009), The Rake's Progress at Det Kongelige Teater and Göteborgsoperan in Göteborg (2009/2010), Don Giovanni at Drottningholm Palace Theater (2010), Alcina am Göteborgsoperan (2011), The Turn of the Screw at Läckö Castle (2011) and Un ballo in maschera at the Stockholm Opera House Folkoperan (2012). In autumn 2012 she designed the costumes for the stage performance of the scenic cantata Carmina Burana at the Folkoperan. Sveriges Radio broadcast an interview with Erskine in March 2011, praising the elegant tuxedos and cocktail dresses she designed for the performance of Alcina in a review.
