= Eileen Farrell =

American soprano (1920–2002)

- Born: February 13, 1920; Willimantic, Connecticut, U.S.
- Died: March 23, 2002 (aged 82); Park Ridge, New Jersey, U.S.
- Occupation: Soprano singer

Eileen Farrell (February 13, 1920 – March 23, 2002) was an American soprano who had a nearly 60-year-long career performing both classical and popular music in concerts, theatres, on radio and television, and on disc. NPR noted, "She possessed one of the largest and most radiant operatic voices of the 20th century." While she was active as an opera singer, her concert engagements far outnumbered her theatrical appearances. Her career was mainly based in the United States, although she did perform internationally. The Daily Telegraph stated that she "was one of the finest American sopranos of the 20th century; she had a voice of magnificent proportions which she used with both acumen and artistry in a wide variety of roles", and described her as having a voice "like some unparalleled phenomenon of nature. She is to singers what Niagara is to waterfalls."

Farrell began her career in 1940 as a member of the CBS Chorus on CBS Radio. In 1941, CBS Radio offered Farrell her own program, Eileen Farrell Sings, on which she performed both classical and popular music for five years. In 1947 she launched her career as a concert soprano and nine years later began performing on the opera stage. The pinnacle of her opera career was five seasons performing at the Metropolitan Opera from 1960 to 1966. She continued to perform and record both classical and popular music throughout her career, and is credited for releasing the first successful crossover album: I've Got a Right to Sing the Blues (1960). After announcing her retirement from performance in 1986, she still continued to perform and record music periodically up into the late 1990s. She was also active as a voice teacher, both privately and for nine years at Indiana University.

== Early life and education ==
Farrell was born in Willimantic, Connecticut, United States, the youngest of three children born to Irish American Catholics Michael Farrell and Catherine Farrell (née Kennedy). Her parents were vaudeville singers who had performed under the name "The Singing O'Farrells" prior to having children. The family moved quite frequently during Farrell's childhood to various towns in Connecticut. Eileen's first clear memories were of her family's home in Storrs, Connecticut, which was where her parents were working as teachers of music and drama at Storrs Agricultural College (now the University of Connecticut).

When Farrell was five years old, her family moved back to Willimantic. After she attended first grade there, her family moved once again to Norwich, Connecticut, after her mother obtained the post of organist at St. Mary's Church in that city. The family remained in Norwich for almost the next 10 years, with Farrell completing her freshman year of high school at Norwich Free Academy in 1935. The family then moved to Woonsocket, Rhode Island, and in the Fall of 1936 Farrell entered Woonsocket High School, from which she graduated in 1939.

Farrell received her early vocal training from her parents during her childhood. Her mother, a talented coloratura soprano, was her primary teacher, but her father, a baritone, also occasionally taught her. Miss Farrell's early singing career was greatly encouraged by her local pastor, Father Cornelius J. Holland, at St. Charles Borromeo Church in Woonsocket, Rhode Island. After graduating from high school, she moved to New York City in August 1939 to study with retired Metropolitan Opera contralto Merle Alcock. While studying singing with Alcock, she received language coaching from Charlie Baker, who was the music director of Rutgers Presbyterian Church. After she had worked with him for a few months, he hired her as a paid singer at Rutgers. When her radio career took off, Baker became Farrell's vocal coach and helped her prepare most of her music. In her autobiography, Can't Help Singing: The Life of Eileen Farrell (1999), she credits Baker with helping her succeed during the early years of her career on radio. Farrell later was a student of vocal and opera coach Eleanor McLellan, whom she credited for giving her a solid technique.

== Early career in radio ==
In 1940, Farrell began her career as a member of the CBS Chorus. After three months with the chorus, CBS offered her a weekly half-hour radio program, Eileen Farrell Sings (also sometimes called Eileen Farrell Presents), on which she would perform both classical and popular music accompanied by the CBS Orchestra under conductor Howard Barlow. The program was coordinated by music director Jim Fassett and was mostly recorded at what is now the Ed Sullivan Theater. On the program she got to sing with several notable guest artists, including Margaret Harshaw, Frank Sinatra, Martial Singher, and Risë Stevens. The program first aired in early 1941 and quickly became popular. It ran through 1946.

While singing on her own program, Farrell also appeared as a guest on several other radio programs. She was a regular guest on Andre Kostelanetz's The Pause That Refreshes and Bernard Herrmann's Invitation to Music. She also made appearances on The Bell Telephone Hour, The Prudential Family Hour, Songs of the Centuries, and Your Hit Parade, among others. In 1944, she made a special Christmas recording that was for the American soldiers stationed abroad during World War II, with Shirley Temple as mistress of ceremonies.

== Concert and opera career ==
During 1947–1948, Farrell toured the US as a concert singer, and in 1949 she toured South America.

Farrell's song recital in New York in October 1950 was enthusiastically acclaimed and gained her immediate recognition. That year, she also appeared in a concert performance of Berg's Wozzeck as Marie. In 1952, she was engaged by Arturo Toscanini for his first and only RCA Victor studio recording of Beethoven's Ninth Symphony, with the NBC Symphony Orchestra.

In the 1955 film Interrupted Melody, which starred Eleanor Parker as Australian soprano Marjorie Lawrence, Farrell supplied the singing voice. As early as 1956 she appeared before an audience of more than 13,000, under the direction of the conductor Alfredo Antonini in a performance of arias from Verdi's Ernani at the Lewisohn Stadium in New York City.

In 1956, she made her stage debut as Santuzza in Mascagni's Cavalleria rusticana with the San Carlo Opera in Tampa, Florida. In 1957, she debuted with the Lyric Opera of Chicago; in 1958, with the San Francisco Opera. She made her Metropolitan Opera debut on December 6, 1960, singing the title role in Gluck's Alceste. She opened the 1962–63 Met season as Maddalena in Giordano's Andrea Chénier, opposite Franco Corelli. She remained on the Met roster through the 1963–64 season, singing forty-four performances in six roles, then returned in March 1966 for two final performances as Maddalena. Her other roles at the Met included the title role in Ponchielli's La Gioconda, Leonora in Verdi's La forza del destino, Isabella in de Falla's Atlàntida, and Santuzza.

Farrell was equally at home singing pop material and opera. She recorded four albums of popular music for Columbia Records: I've Got a Right to Sing the Blues, Here I Go Again, This Fling Called Love and Together with Love. The first album reached No. 15 in the USA.

Throughout the 1960s she was a frequent soloist with the New York Philharmonic under the direction of Leonard Bernstein; she was also a favorite of Thomas Schippers. With Eugene Ormandy, the Philadelphia Orchestra, and the Mormon Tabernacle Choir, she was a featured soloist in an abridged recording of Handel's Messiah. The other featured soloists were Martha Lipton, Davis Cunningham and William Warfield.

From 1971 to 1980, Farrell was professor of music at the Indiana University School of Music in Bloomington. From 1983 to 1985, she was professor of music at the University of Maine in Orono. She also made several recordings of blues music late in her career, as well as a well-received duet with Frank Sinatra on his Trilogy album (1979), in which they sang a version of the country music hit "For the Good Times". This introduced her to a new group of fans, especially Sinatra expert Charles Fasciano, who considered this song his personal favorite. She published a memoir, Can't Help Singing, in 1999.

In her later career, sometime in 1981 or 1982, she hosted her own television show which aired on CBS Cable, where she sang various songs from her career, including "Happiness is a Thing Called Joe" and "I've Got a Right to Sing the Blues" with Ted Taylor accompanying her on piano.

Beginning in 1987, she began to record pop albums again. Her first was for the Audiophile label called With Much Love. She later recorded several albums for the Reference label that were well received.

Farrell was married to a New York Police Department officer, Robert Vincent Reagan, with whom she maintained homes in the Grymes Hill and Emerson Hill areas of Staten Island, New York. They had a son and daughter. He died in 1986. She was elected to Woonsocket's Hall of Fame. A resident of Cliffside Park, New Jersey, Farrell died at a nursing home in Park Ridge, New Jersey, on March 23, 2002, aged 82.

== Selected discography ==
- Eileen Farrell Sings Torch Songs. Arrangements by Loonis McGlohon, Reference Recordings, 1990.
- Rodgers: The Sound of Music, conducted by Erich Kunzel, Telarc 1988.
- Carols for Christmas Eve, conducted by Luther Henderson and His Orchestra, Sony BMG Masterworks, 1960
- I Gotta Right to Sing the Blues, conducted by Luther Henderson and his Orchestra, Sony Classics 1959 & 1961
- Eileen Farell—Puccini Arias, conducted by Max Rudolf and the Columbia Symphony Orchestra, Sony Classics 1959 & 1960
- Eileen Farrell sings Verdi, conducted by Max Rudolf and Fausto Cleva, Columbia Symphony Orchestra 1960 & 1961
- Wagner—Wesendonck Lieder, Siegfried, Act III, Scene 3; Eileen Farrell and Set Svanholm; Leopold Stowkowski and Erich Leinsdorf, conductors; Testament SBT 1415
- Eileen Farrell sings Opera Arias & Songs, conducted by Thomas Schippers and the Philharmonia Orchestra 9/1957;Testament 1073

== Sources ==
- Eileen Farrell; Brian Kellow (1999). Can't help singing: the life of Eileen Farrell. University Press of New England. ISBN 9781555534066.
