= Kristinn Sigmundsson =

Icelandic operatic bass (born 1951)

Kristinn Sigmundsson (born 1 March 1951) is an Icelandic operatic bass.

Sigmundsson earned a degree in biology from the University of Iceland. He then worked as a teacher before commencing music studies under Guðmundur Jónsson at the Reykjavik Academy of Singing. Later, he studied at the Hochschule für Musik und darstellende Kunst in Vienna, Austria, under Helene Karusso, Christian Möller and Wolfgang Gabriel. His other teachers have included John Bullock. Sigmundsson began his freelance career in 1992.

Sigmundsson has made a number of recordings, including Sarastro in Arnold Östman's version of the Magic Flute, and Commendatore in his version of Don Giovanni. He also sang the role of Christ in Frans Brüggen's recordings of Bach's St John Passion and St Matthew Passion. Other recordings include a set of opera arias with the Iceland Symphony Orchestra and Arnold Östman, and Schubert's Schwanengesang and Winterreise with pianist Jónas Ingimundarson. He has re-recorded Winterreise with pianist Víkingur Ólafsson in 2012. Sigmundsson is featured on the Pentatone of Corigliano's opera The Ghost of Versailles, taken from live performances in 2015.

Sigmundsson is a visiting professor at the Listaháskólai Islands (Iceland University of the Arts). His honours include the Philadelphia Opera Prize, the Íslensku tónlistarverðlaunin (Icelandic Music Prize) for 1995, 2010 and 2011, and he Útflutningsverðlaun Forseta Íslands (Presidential Prize of Iceland) for 2011.
