= Sangis =

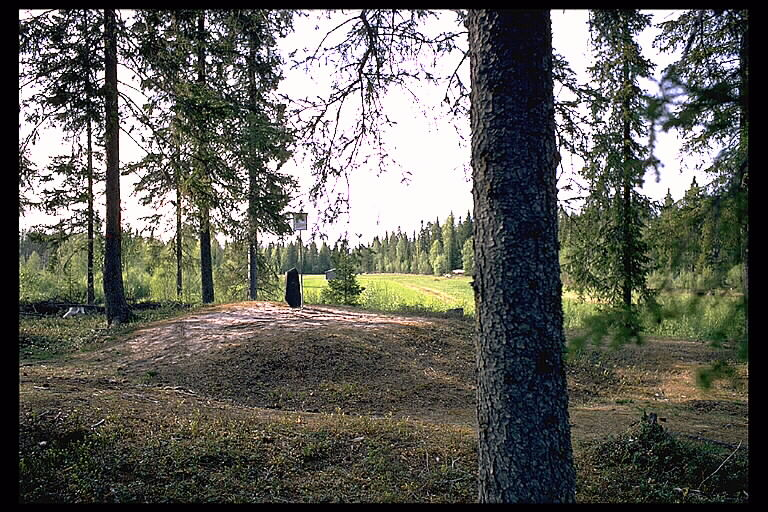

- Location within Norrbotten Location within Sweden
- Coordinates: 65°51′N 23°30′E
- Country: Sweden
- Province: Norrbotten
- County: Norrbotten County
- Municipality: Kalix Municipality

Area
  - Total: 2.48 km^{2} (0.96 sq mi)

Population (31 December 2010)
  - Total: 572
  - Density: 231/km^{2} (600/sq mi)
- Time zone: UTC+1 (CET)
  - Summer (DST): UTC+2 (CEST)

Sangis (Swedish pronunciation: [ˈsǎŋːɪs]) is a locality situated in Kalix Municipality, Norrbotten County, Sweden with 572 inhabitants in 2010.

The Sangis river runs through the village until it meets the sea a few km to the south.
