= Eric Ericson =

Swedish choral conductor and teacher

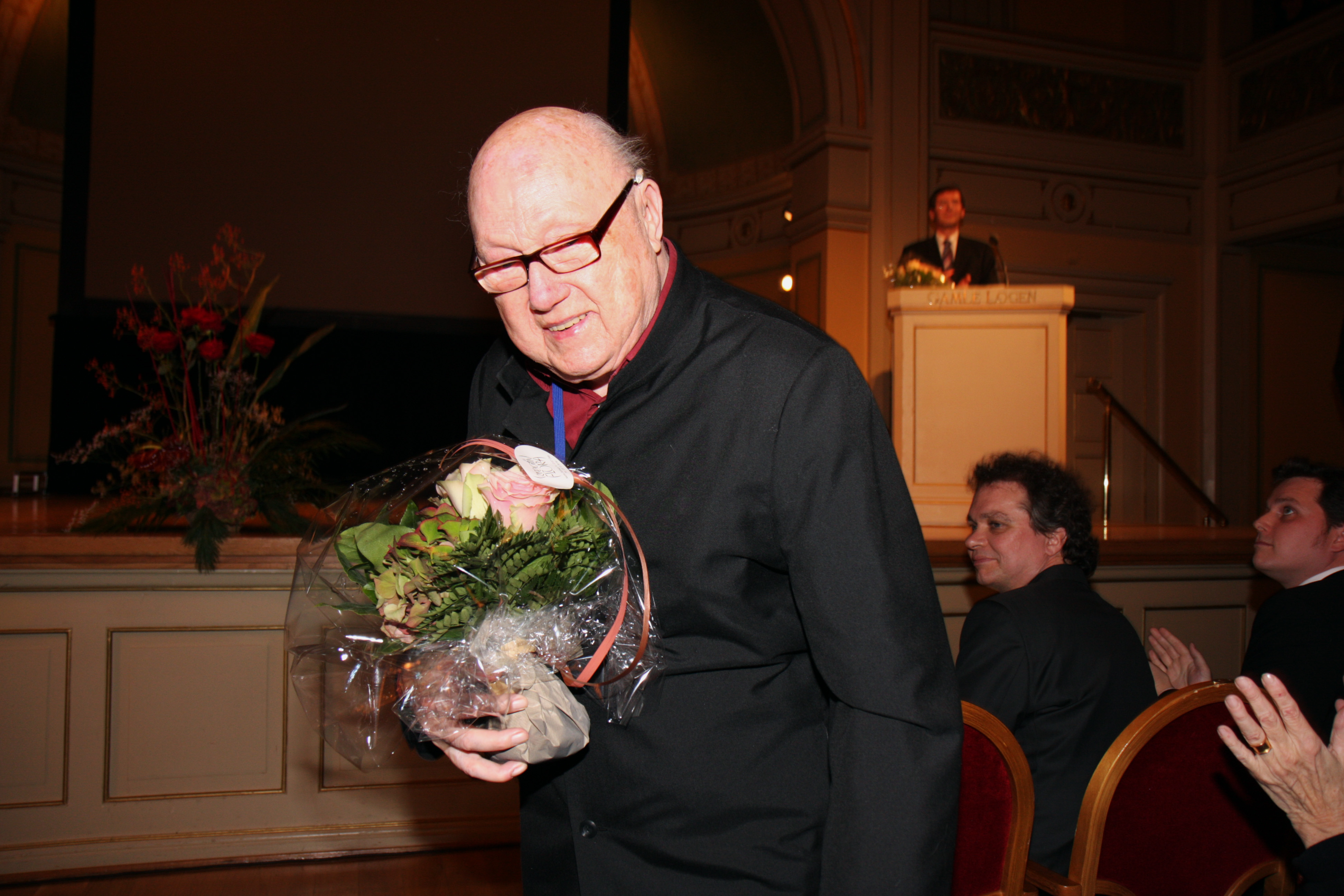
Eric Ericson (2007)

Eric Gustaf Ericson (26 October 1918 – 16 February 2013) was a Swedish choral conductor and influential choral teacher.

== Life and career ==
He graduated from the Royal College of Music (Kungliga Musikhögskolan) in Stockholm in 1943 and went on to complete his studies abroad, at the Schola Cantorum Basiliensis, Switzerland, and in Germany, Great Britain, and the United States.

Renowned for his innovative teaching methods and the wide-ranging nature of his repertoire, Ericson was the principal conductor of the Orphei Drängar choir at Uppsala University from 1951 until 1991, and choirmaster until 1982 of the Swedish Radio Choir which was established on his initiative in 1950. Also in 1951, he began his teaching career at the Royal College of Music in Stockholm, where he became a legendary and inspirational figure, and he was appointed to the chair of choral conducting there in 1968. In 1983 Ericson received an honorary doctorate from the Faculty of Humanities at Uppsala University, Sweden.

He won the Nordic Council Music Prize in 1995, and in 1997 Ericson shared the Polar Music Prize with Bruce Springsteen: the citation was for "pioneering achievements as a conductor, teacher, artistic originator and inspirer in Swedish and international choral music". On the occasion of his 80th birthday in 1998, Swedbank of Sweden endowed an "Eric Ericson Chair in Choral Directing" at Uppsala University.

He founded the Eric Ericson Chamber Choir, and worked as a guest conductor for many ensembles and choirs including Drottningholm Baroque Ensemble (Bach's Passions), Netherlands Chamber Choir (Poulenc), Chœur de chambre Accentus, Paris (Finnish works).

His conducting for the 1975 Bergman film The Magic Flute was described as "impressive" in its balance of "levity and solemnity", and the reviewer noted that Ericson was "a Mozartian to be reckoned with".

== Awards ==
- Litteris et Artibus (1968)
- Léonie Sonning Music Prize (1991; Denmark)
- Nordic Council Music Prize (1995, Denmark, Iceland, Norway, Sweden and Finland)
- Polar Music Prize (1997, Sweden)
- Illis quorum (1988)
- KTH Great Prize

== Selected recordings ==
- Compositions by Ingvar Lidholm, Sven-David Sandström, Tomas Jennefelt, Jorgen Jersild – Eric Ericson Chamber Choir, Caprice CAP21461 2002.
- Skandinavien – Choir de Chambre Accentus, FCM (2000)
- Conductor of the Stockholm Chamber Choir in Castor et Pollux conducted by Nikolaus Harnoncourt, 1972

== See also ==
- List of Swedes in music
