= The Magic Flute (1975 film) =

1975 Swedish musical film

- Directed by: Ingmar Bergman
- Written by: Emanuel Schikaneder, with translation and revisions by Alf Henrikson and Ingmar Bergman
- Produced by: Måns Reuterswärd
- Starring: Josef Köstlinger; Irma Urrila; Håkan Hagegård; Ulrik Cold; Birgit Nordin
- Cinematography: Sven Nykvist
- Music by: Wolfgang Amadeus Mozart
- Production companies: Sveriges Radio; TV2; AB Svensk Filmindustri; Svenska Filminstituet
- Distributed by: Sveriges Radio/TV2/AB Svensk Filmindustri
- Release date: 1 January 1975
- Running time: 135 minutes
- Country: Sweden
- Language: Swedish
- Budget: $650,000

The Magic Flute (Swedish: Trollflöjten) is Ingmar Bergman's 1975 film version of Wolfgang Amadeus Mozart's opera Die Zauberflöte. It was intended as a television production and was first shown on Swedish television on 1 January 1975, but was followed by a theatrical release later that year. The work is widely viewed as one of the most successful films of an opera ever made, and as an unusual item among the director's works.

== Background ==
The film's inception is rooted in Bergman's youth. He first saw The Magic Flute at the Royal Swedish Opera in Stockholm when he was 12 and hoped then to recreate it in his marionette theatre at home; he could not do so because he could not afford the cost of a recording. Also while still a child, he serendipitously discovered the Baroque theater that served as the inspiration for his much-later production:

As a boy I loved to roam around. One October day I set out for Drottningholm (in Stockholm) to see its unique court theater from the eighteenth century. For some reason the stage door was unlocked. I walked inside and saw for the first time the carefully restored baroque theater. I remember distinctly what a bewitching experience it was: the effect of chiaroscuro, the silence, the stage. In my imagination I have always seen The Magic Flute living inside that old theater, in that keenly acoustical wooden box, with its slanted stage floor, its backdrops and wings. Here lies the noble, magical illusion of theater. Nothing is; everything represents. The moment the curtain is raised, an agreement between stage and audience manifests itself. And now, together, we'll create! In other words, it is obvious that the drama of The Magic Flute should unfold in a baroque theater.

At one stage, Bergman had hoped to direct a production at the Malmö City Theater. The origin of his filmed version was in the 1960s, when Magnus Enhörning, head of the Swedish Radio, asked him for possible projects and he replied "I want to do The Magic Flute for television". Enhörning readily agreed and supported the project without hesitation.

== Script ==
The German-language libretto of The Magic Flute was the work of Mozart's collaborator Emanuel Schikaneder, who was also theatre manager and sang Papageno at the first performances in 1791. For the plot, see The Magic Flute, and for details of the libretto see Libretto of The Magic Flute.

In 1968, the Swedish poet Alf Henrikson prepared a Swedish-language version of the libretto for the purpose of a performance by the Royal Swedish Opera, which Bergman adopted as the basis of his script. However, Bergman altered the libretto in a number of respects: Sarastro is Pamina's father, trios in act 2 are omitted, and "Ein Mädchen oder Weibchen" is sung by Papageno just before he sees Papagena. Instead of his usual costume of plumage, Papageno wears conventional clothing. The roles of the Three Slaves, originally spoken roles assigned to adult actors, are given to children, who are silent.

Evidon suggests that the characters of Frid and Petra in Bergman's 1955 film Smiles of a Summer Night, and Johan and Alma in his Hour of the Wolf (1968) pre-figure his conception of Papageno and Papagena, and Tamino and Pamina respectively in The Magic Flute. The latter film includes a puppet-theatre sequence of part of act 1 of the opera. Evidon also sees a parallel between Bergman's treatment of Sarastro and Amfortas in Parsifal.

== Production ==
In producing the opera, Bergman sought to fulfill his early dream of a production in the Drottningholm Palace Theatre (one of the few surviving Baroque theatres in the world). This setting would approximate the conditions of the original 1791 production in the Theater auf der Wieden in Vienna. The introductory exterior shots of the film are intended to suggest that it was indeed filmed in the Drottningholm theatre. However, the scenery at Drottningholm "was considered too fragile to accommodate a film crew. So the stage – complete with wings, curtains, and wind machines – was painstakingly copied and erected in the studios of the Swedish Film Institute".

Bergman asked his friend Hans Schmidt-Isserstedt to conduct the opera, but he flatly refused. Choir conductor Eric Ericson also declined at first but was later persuaded by Bergman to take it on.

The costumes were the work of Henny Noremark and Karin Erskine; the two received an Academy Award nomination for their work.

The film is notable as the first made-for-television film (and filmed in then-standard 4:3 television aspect ratio) with a stereo soundtrack. It was shot in 16 mm. film as an economy measure, but released in the standard theatrical 35 mm format. The cinematographer was Bergman's longtime colleague Sven Nykvist.

The process of creating the film began with a recording session, starting 6 April 1974, at the Circus Theater in Stockholm. In addition to the singers who appeared in the film, the musical forces included the Swedish Radio Symphony Orchestra and Ericsson's own choir, the Swedish Radio Choir. This recording provided a carefully sung version with balanced audio, to which the singers later synchronized their mimed singing during filming. The latter began on 16 April 1974 at Filmhuset in Stockholm, Studio 1, and was completed in July. The film had its first screening in the old barn at Bergman's house on Fårö (which had just been transformed into a cinema) on an August evening in the same year.

== Cast ==
Bergman later wrote (in his book Images) on how he chose his singers.

Since we were not performing The Magic Flute on a stage but in front of a microphone and camera, we did not need large voices. What we needed were warm, sensuous voices that had personality. To me it was also absolutely essential that the play be performed by young actors, naturally close to dizzy, emotional shifts between joy and sorrow, between thinking and feeling. Tamino must be a handsome young man. Pamina must be a beautiful young woman. Not to speak of Papageno and Papagena.

- Josef Köstlinger – Tamino
- Britt-Marie Aruhn; Kirsten Vaupel; Birgitta Smiding – Three Ladies
- Håkan Hagegård – Papageno
- Birgit Nordin – Queen of the Night
- Irma Urrila – Pamina
- Ragnar Ulfung – Monostatos
- Ulrik Cold – Sarastro
- Elisabeth Erikson – Papagena
- Erik Saedén – Speaker
- Gösta Prüzelius – First Priest
- Ulf Johanson – Second Priest
- Hans Johansson and Jerker Arvidson – Two Sentries in Armor
- Einar Larson, Siegfried Svensson, Sixten Fark, Sven-Eric Jacobsson, Folke Jonsson, Gösta Bäckelin, Arne Hendriksen, Hans Kyhle, Carl Henric Qvarfordt – Nine Priests
- Urban Malmberg, Ansgar Krook, Erland von Heijne – Three Boys
- Unknown – First, Second, and Third Slaves
- Lisbeth Zachrisson, Nina Harte, Helena Högberg, Elina Lehto, Lena Wennergen, Jane Darling, Sonja Karlsson – Seven Girl Attendants
- Helene Friberg – Girl in Audience

The Swedish Film Institute lists some of the other individuals who appear very briefly during the overture as audience members: Ingmar Bergman himself, his son Daniel Bergman, his wife Ingrid von Rosen, Erland Josephson, Lisbeth Zachrisson, the film's cinematographer Sven Nykvist, János Herskó, Magnus Blomkvist, the film's choreographer Donya Feuer, and Lars-Owe Carlberg.

== Style ==
Bergman sought to tell the story not with a realistic cinematic depiction of a fairy-tale world, but rather with a realistic depiction of a theatrical event, itself portraying a fairy-tale world. To this end he constantly reminds the viewer of the theatrical context, for instance by showing the audience. As the overture begins, the screen is filled by a close-up shot of the face of a young girl, deeply engaged with the performance. As the music proceeds (the orchestra is never shown) this view gives way to close-ups of many different faces in the audience – faces of many races, ages, and classes. After the action begins, the young girl briefly reappears from time to time, her facial expressions often reflecting the music.

Another way in which Bergman reminds the viewer that the film is a theatrical event is to display openly the mechanical stagecraft of the 18th century theater. The scenery of the time could hardly vie in realism with modern-day effects, but it was fluid and swiftly changeable. Thus when the Queen of the Night first arrives, day turns to night as we witness the shifting backcloths moving to create the new scene. Similarly, when Papagena and Papageno joyously discover each other in a winter landscape, the chiming of the magic bells quickly changes the scenery from Winter into Spring while the two characters remove each other's winter garments. The arrival of the Three Boys by descent in a charmingly decorated 18th-century hot-air balloon represents a faithful reflection by Bergman of Schikaneder's original libretto; Schikaneder's theater abounded in mechanical devices of this kind.

Throughout the performance and during the intermission, we get backstage views of the theatre. Tamino plays his flute while, through the wings, we catch sight of Papageno (responding to Tamino's flute) and Pamina. At this stage in the plot, Pamina and Tamino have not yet met. The opposite happens when Pamina and Papageno are on stage and, this time, it is Tamino who is seen sitting on a ladder in the wings responding to Papageno's pan flute. Earlier, when Papageno sings his first aria, we see Papagena appear from the rafters, but at this stage, they too have not yet met. During the intermission, Sarastro's priests gather on the stage, readying themselves for the priestly council that will begin the second act. Sarastro himself (Ulrik Cold out of character – he wears glasses) sits reading the score of Parsifal (at the time, Cold was rehearsing for a recording of the opera) while the camera pans to a child playing one of Monostatos' slaves reading a Donald Duck comic book. Birgit Nordin has her makeup adjusted, preparing for her later appearance under grotesquely colored lighting as she sings her second act aria "Der Hölle Rache". Finally, as the curtain is about to rise for act 2, another of Monostatos' child slaves peers through a low peephole in the curtain and he is joined by Sarastro who peeps through a higher one.

A conceit of these backstage glimpses is that the singers themselves are made to resemble the characters they are playing. For example, prior to Papageno's first entry, there is a cut to Håkan Hagegård (Papageno's actor) backstage in his dressing room. Suddenly, to be ready for his cue, he jumps up out of his bed and rushes to the wings where he plays the appropriate notes on his pipe, is then helped into his birdcage by a stagehand (dressed as one of the bats Tamino encounters later on in act 1), and thus succeeds in making his entrance in the nick of time. Thus Hagegård is seen as just as unreliable, and imperturbable, as Papageno. During intermission, the Queen of the Night (Birgit Nordin) and the Three Ladies, having already been revealed as wicked, are seen smoking cigarettes in front of a "Smoking Forbidden" sign. Pamina and Tamino (Irma Urrila and Josef Köstlinger) are seen during intermission quietly playing chess in the dressing room, perhaps reflecting the chastity of their relationship as characters in the opera. Ulrik Cold studies his part for Parsifal with no less gravity than he brings to the role of Sarastro.

Although the film emphasizes the context of the old theater, it also includes many effects that are purely cinematic. Thus, there are many close-ups of the singers. As Tamino looks at the locket containing Pamina's picture, she comes alive inside the locket, with the ominous face of Monostatos glimpsed over her shoulder. The scene in which Three Boys prevent Pamina's near-suicide takes place in the snow, and clearly not on the theater stage.

== Reception ==
The film was a great success. In its televised premiere on New Year's Day 1975, it reached a third of the population of Sweden, and in theatrical release it created "pandemonium at box offices around the world" (Pauline Kael) and delighted many critics. In her review in The New Yorker, Kael wrote:

Ingmar Bergman's film version of The Magic Flute is a blissful present, a model of how opera can be filmed. Bergman must have reached a new, serene assurance to have tackled this sensuous, luxuriant opera that has bewildered so many stage directors, and to have brought it off so unaffectedly. It's a wholly unfussy production, with the bloom still on it.

The film was shown at the 1975 Cannes Film Festival, but was not entered into the main competition. It won a special award at National Society of Film Critics Awards. Film critic Roger Ebert ranked the film 3rd in his 10 Best Films of 1975 list. The film won the BAFTA TV Award for Best Foreign Television Programme in 1976 and was nominated for the Golden Globe for Best Foreign Language Film and the Academy Award for Best Costume Design. It was included in British Film Institute's list of 10 Great Opera Films in 2017. On the review aggregator website Rotten Tomatoes, The Magic Flute has an approval rating of 92% based on 25 reviews, with an average score of 8.00/10.

The theatrical release made profits sufficient to blunt earlier criticism that Swedish Radio had devoted too much of its funds to a single large project. A substantial body of critical scholarship ultimately arose centered on the film. Of the singers, Håkan Hagegård went on to a prominent international career in opera and recitals.

Following re-mastering by the Swedish Film Institute, a blu-ray edition was published by the BFI in 2018; the Opera reviewer noted the "pin-sharp visuals and dynamic sound, highlighting the spatial care with which Bergman matches music to word and image".

The film was reviewed from a musical perspective by Richard Evidon, who paid Bergman the compliment of praising the film as a realization of Mozart's own vision: "Only Ingmar Bergman could have made this Magic Flute; but part of his achievement is in letting us forget the director's hand as we watch and are drawn closer to Mozart's sublime work."

== Sources ==
- Anonymous (1975) Press kit for the original release of the film. Archived at the University of California, Berkeley Art Museum and Pacific Film Archive.
- Ebert, Roger; Bordwell, David (2008). Awake in the Dark: The Best of Roger Ebert. University of Chicago Press.
- Evidon, Richard (1976). "Bergman and The Magic Flute". The Musical Times. 117 (1596 (February 1976)): 130–131. doi:10.2307/960219. JSTOR 960219.
- Kael, Pauline (2011). Sanford Schwartz (ed.). The Age of Movies: Selected Writings of Pauline Kael. Library of America. ISBN 9781598531718.
- Steene, Birgitta (2005). Ingmar Bergman: A reference guide. Amsterdam University Press. ISBN 9789053564066.
- Törnqvist, Egil (2003). Bergman's Muses: Æsthetic Versatility in Film, Theatre, Television and Radio. McFarland. ISBN 9780786482023.
- Vermilye, Jerry (2002). Ingmar Bergman: His Life and Films. McFarland. ISBN 9780786411603.
