= String Quartet No. 4 (Rautavaara) =

String quartet by Einojuhani Rautavaara

- by Einojuhani Rautavaara
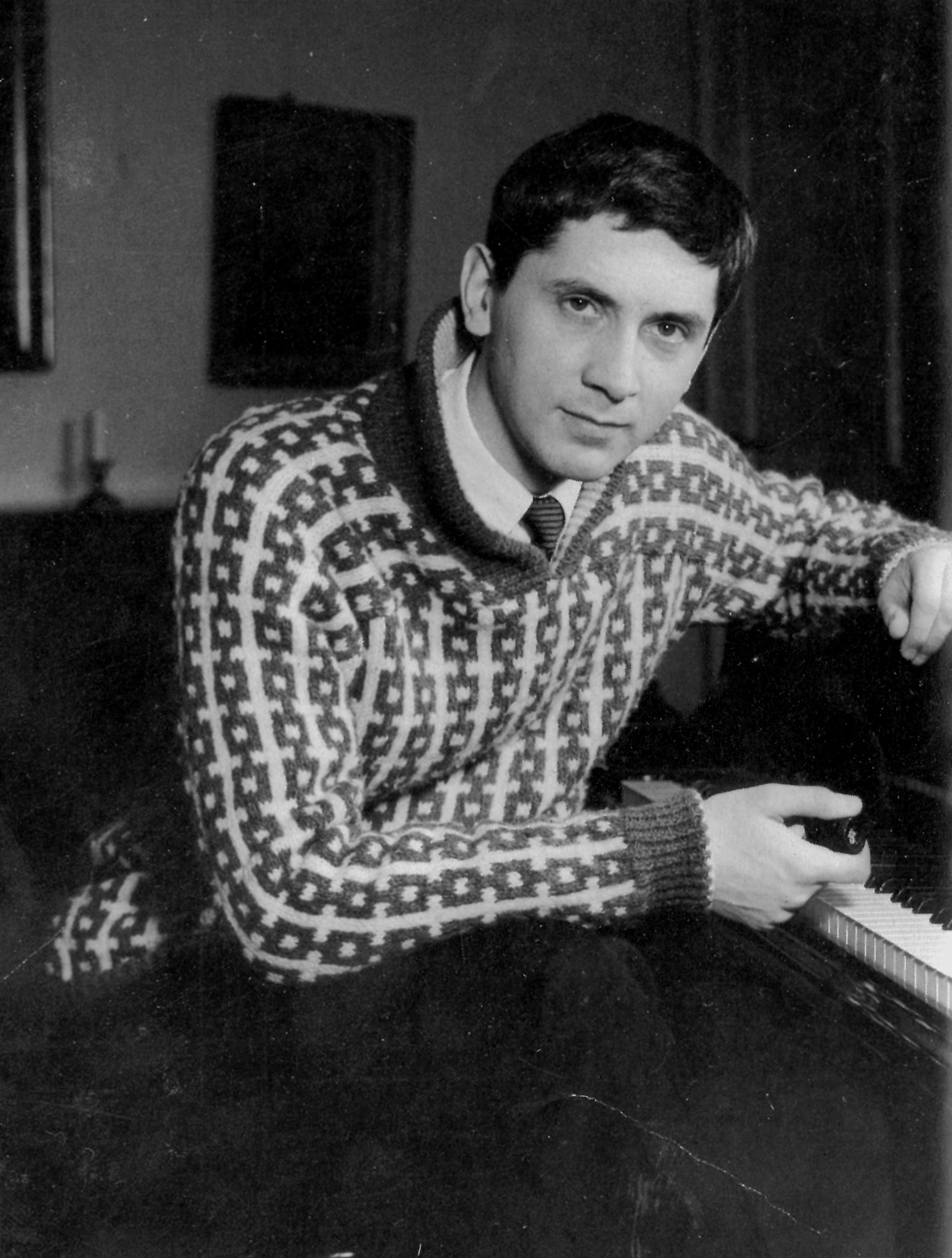
- Einojuhani Rautavaara, in the 50s.
- Opus: 87
- Composed: 1975
- Published: 1994
- Movements: 3
- Scoring: String Quartet

The String Quartet No. 4, Op. 87, is Einojuhani Rautavaara's last string quartet, composed in 1975.

== Composition ==
Rautavaara's Fourth String Quartet was written in the summer of 1975, in Rautavaara's summer cottage in the West Finnish archipelago and, like all the other string quartets, it faded into obscurity after its completion. It is very rarely performed and recorded. It was dedicated to the Voces Intimae Quartet. It was published in 1994, 19 years later, by Fazer Music, in Espoo.

== Structure ==
This string quartet is divided into three untitled movements and has a total duration of around 22 minutes. The movement list is as follows:

1. = c. 66
2. = 88 – 96 (Come un sogno)
3. = 84 (Note: These tempo markings are the ones indicated at the beginning of each movement. However, tempo changes are frequent in this composition.)

The first movement is a dialog-like introduction where all the instruments proffer variations of the basic musical idea they are given in the first few bars. It has 195 bars in total and has many tempo and signature changes. This movement uses glissandi passages to lend the piece a surrealistic air. The second movement presents, as Rautavaara himself put it, "the central feature of this quartet": the progressive development of the leitmotif, presented in the first bars. The nocturne-like second movement, as opposed to the first, has a steady tempo all throughout, and the accompanying voices of the melody have a constant quarter-note pulse that acts almost like a metronome. It is a lyrical, 90-bar movement that ends in a pianissimo. Finally, the quick, 115-bar third movement begins with an impassioned, rapid texture that later matures into a nostalgic variant of the original leitmotiv from the second movement. This violent texture from the beginning returns twice, but only in brief manifestations. Eventually, the music fades into silence.

== Recordings ==
The following is a list of recordings of this string quartet:

- The authoritative version by Voces Intimae was recorded on August 27, 1976, at Nacka Aula, in Nacka. The quartet consisted of Jorma Rahkonen and Ari Angervo at the violins, Mauri Pietikäinen at the viola, and Veikko Höylä at the cello. The recording was released on compact disc by BIS Records in January, 1993.
- The Sirius String Quartet also recorded the piece on April 5, 1994, at Clinton Studios, New York City. The quartet consisted of violinists Laura Seaton and Mary Rowell, violist Ron Lawrence, and cellist Mary Wooten. The recording was released on compact disc by Catalyst Records in 1994.
