= Erika Köth =

German opera singer

- Born: 15 September 1925; Darmstadt, Weimar Republic
- Died: 20 February 1989 (aged 63); Speyer, West Germany
- Occupation: Opera singer
- Years active: 1947–1978

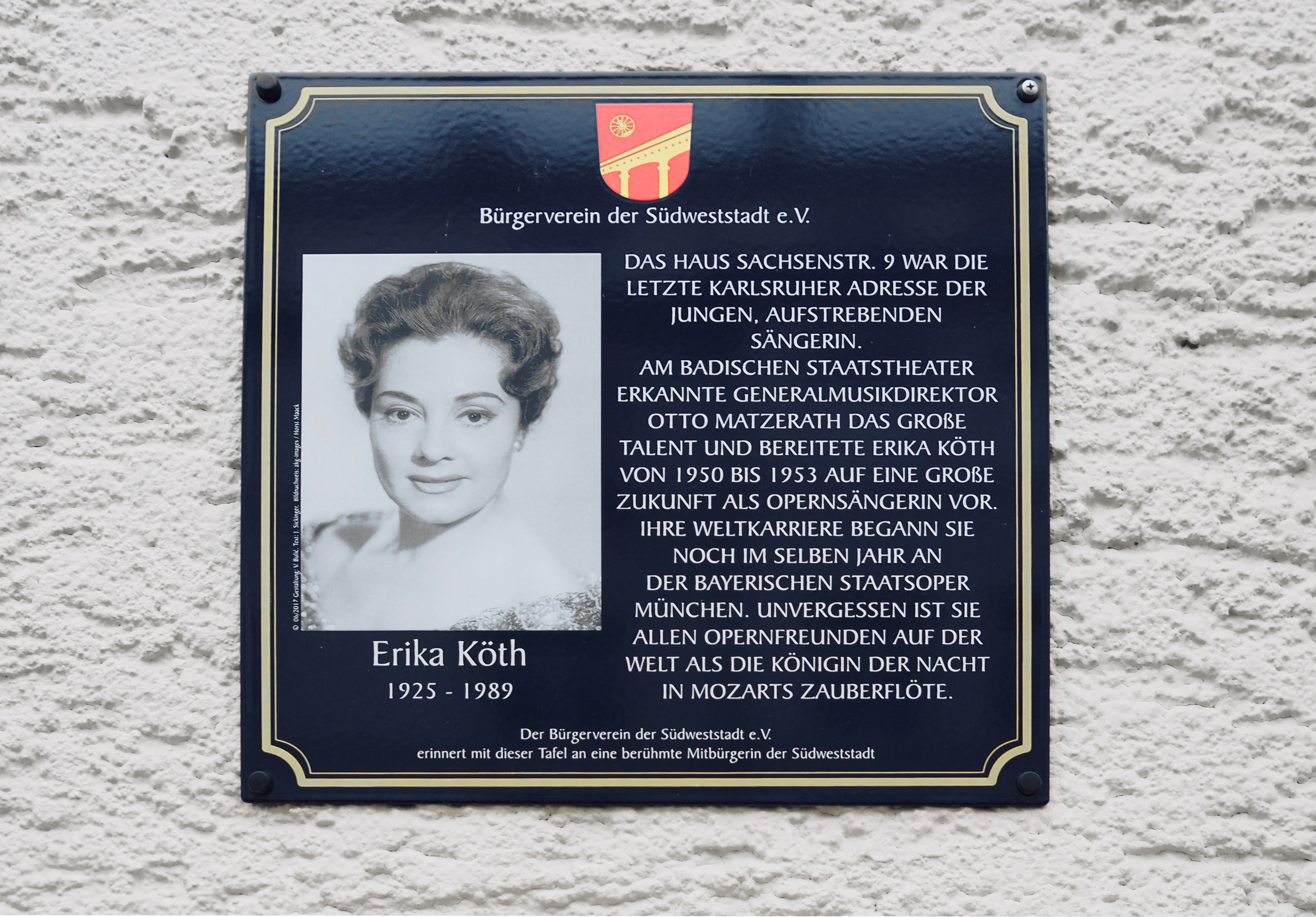
Erika Köth

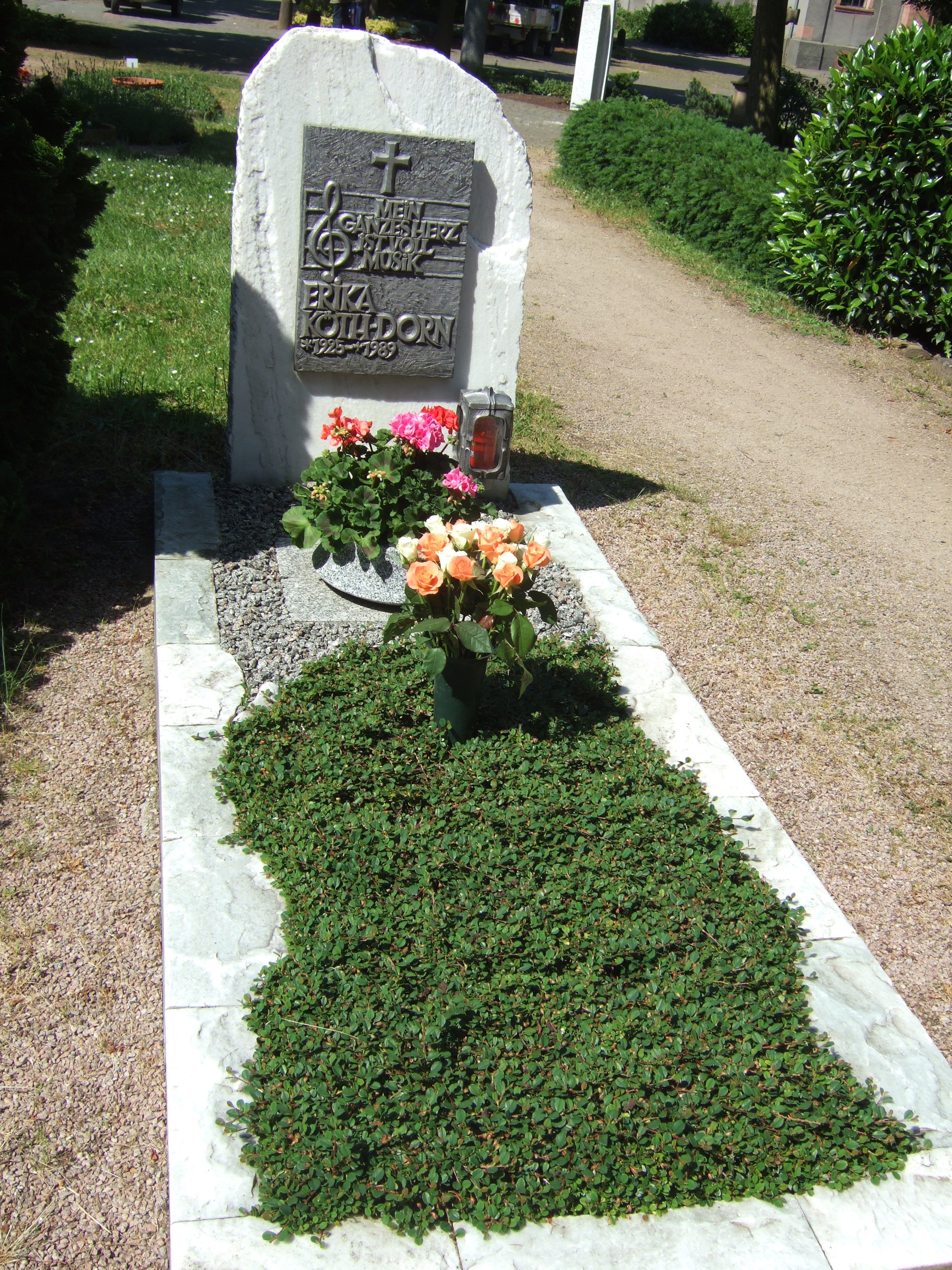
Grave of Erika Köth in the Alter Friedhof (old cemetery) in Darmstadt

Erika Köth (15 September 1925 – 20 February 1989) was a German operatic coloratura soprano, particularly associated with the roles of Zerbinetta and Zerlina.

Köth began a musical studies in Darmstadt with Elsa Blank in 1942, and after an interruption resumed them in 1945. She made her stage debut in Kaiserslautern as Philine in Mignon, in 1948, and then sang in Karlsruhe (1950–53). She made her debut at the Munich State Opera and the Vienna State Opera in 1953, and at the Berlin State Opera in 1961. She appeared regularly at the Salzburg Festival (1955–64), as the Queen of the Night and Konstanze and Sophie, and in Bayreuth (1965–68), as the Woodbird. She also made guest appearances in Milan, Paris, London, etc.

Her repertory included: Susanna, Zerlina, Sophie, Despina, Queen of the Night, Lucia, Gilda, Stravinsky's Le Rossignol, and The Rake's Progress.

She had a small but piercing voice with a high extended range.

She can be seen on black-and-white video in the role of Rosina in a complete German performance of The Barber of Seville with Fritz Wunderlich, Hermann Prey, and Hans Hotter, and in a German performance of Don Giovanni, with Dietrich Fischer-Dieskau, Donald Grobe, Walter Berry, and Josef Greindl. Her discography also includes many operetta and lieder recordings.
