= Swedish Radio Choir =

The Swedish Radio Choir is a professional choir. It is part of Sveriges Radio, the public radio broadcasting company of Sweden. The choir consists of 32 singers and their chorus master Marc Korovitch. Peter Dijkstra is the choir's most recent chief conductor. He left the position after eleven years, in 2018. Since 1979 the Swedish Radio Choir has been based at the Swedish Radio Concert Hall, Berwaldhallen, in Stockholm.

In 2010 the Swedish Radio Choir was included in Gramophone magazine's special feature article where an international jury was asked to name the world's leading choirs.

== Chief conductors ==
- 1925 - 1952 Axel Nylander and Einar Ralf
- 1952 - 1982 Eric Ericson
- 1982 - 1985 Anders Öhrwall
- 1986 - 1994 Gustaf Sjökvist
- 1995 - 2001 Tõnu Kaljuste
- 2002 - 2005 Stefan Parkman
- 2007 - 2018 Peter Dijkstra
- 2020-2026 Kaspars Putniņš
