= Irma Urrila =

Finnish operatic soprano (born 1943)

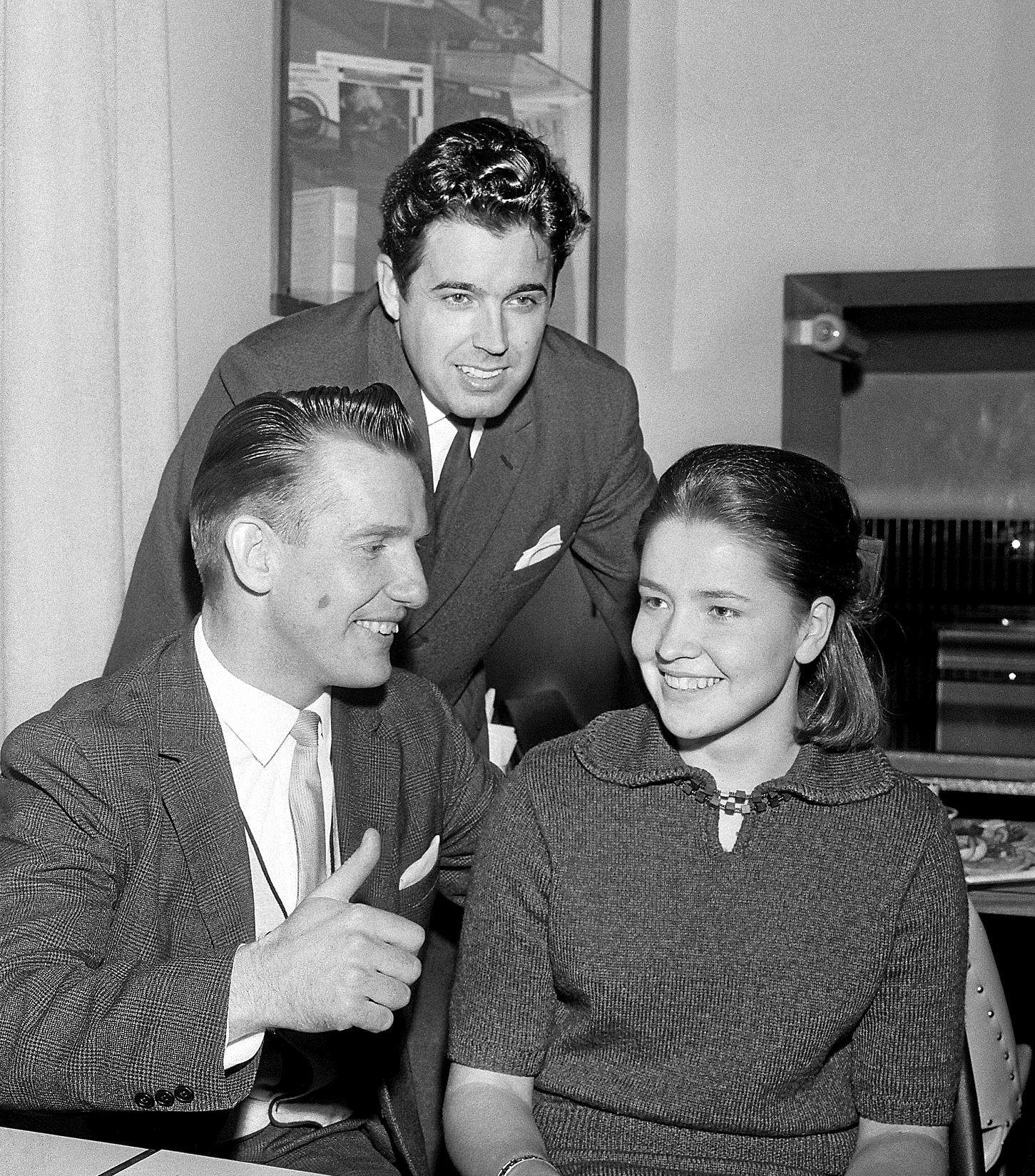
Tenor Caj Ehrstedt, baritone Antti Kaleva, Irma Urrila. 1964

Irma Urrila (born 29 January 1943) is a Finnish operatic soprano best known internationally for her role as Pamina in Ingmar Bergman's 1975 film production of Mozart's opera, The Magic Flute.

Urrila was born in Helsinki, Finland. In 1967, she sang the role of Marzelline in a film version of Beethoven's Fidelio from the Savonlinna Opera Festival. In 1978, she sang Tatjana in a film version of Tchaikovsky's Eugene Onegin.
