= Håkan Hagegård =

Swedish operatic baritone

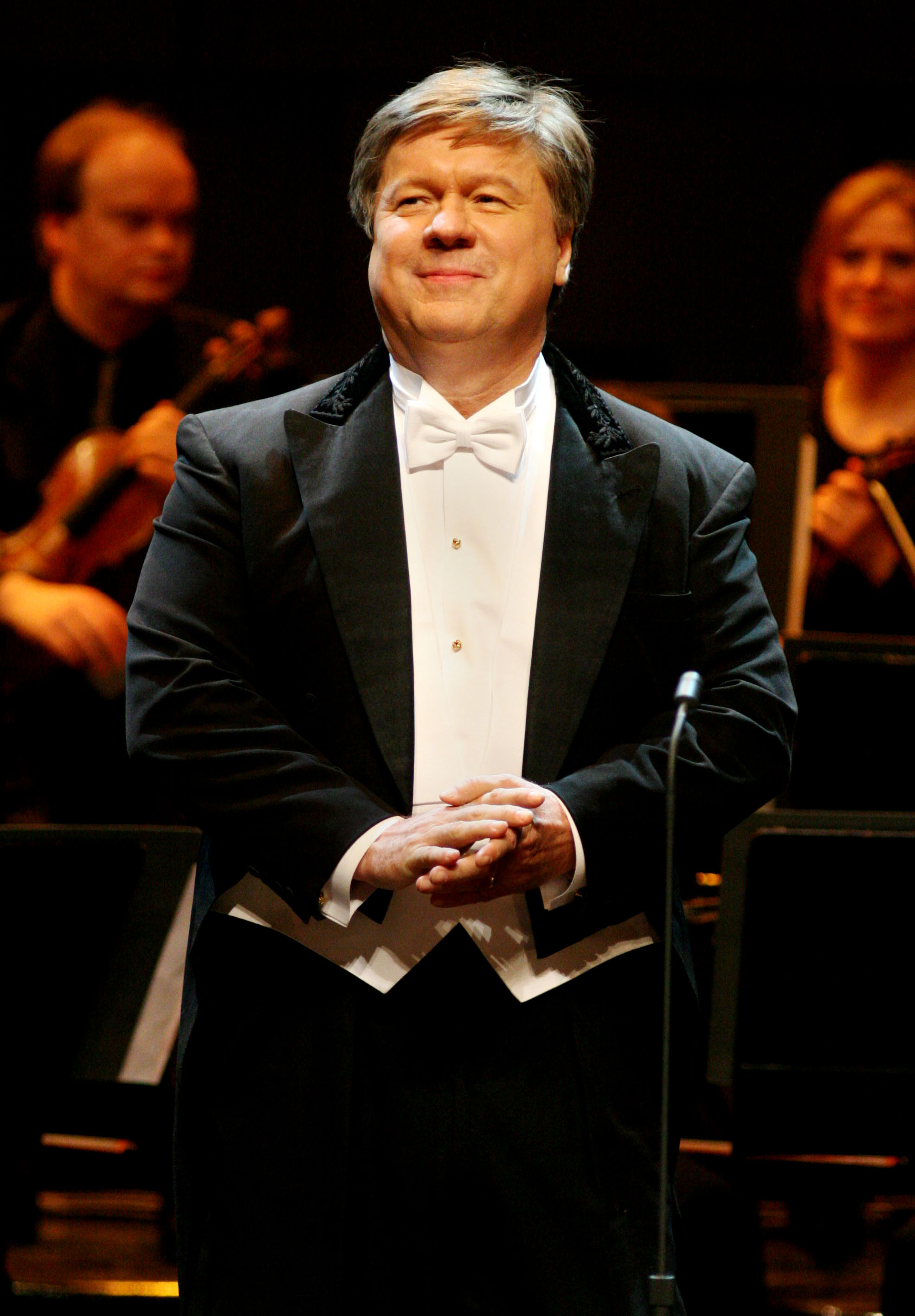
Hagegård performs at the 2005 Polar Music Prize ceremony.

Nils Olov Håkan Hagegård (born 25 November 1945) is a Swedish operatic baritone. He also performs lieder and has held academic positions in the United States, Norway, and Sweden.

== Early life and education ==
Born in Karlstad, Hagegård studied at the Royal College of Music, Stockholm where he was a voice student of famous Swedish soprano Helga Görlin. He later pursued further vocal studies with Tito Gobbi in Rome, Gerald Moore in London, and Erik Werba in Vienna. He also studied at the Mozarteum in Salzburg.

== Career ==
His début as a singer was in 1965, in an open-air performance of Fredrik August Dahlgren's Värmlänningarna at Ransäter. He made his operatic début in 1968 at the Royal Opera in Stockholm as Papageno in Mozart's Die Zauberflöte. The role brought him international acclaim in Ingmar Bergman's 1975 film of the opera. He was attached to the Royal Opera from 1970 to 1978.

He subsequently made his first appearance at the Drottningholm Theatre in 1970, as Pacuvio in Rossini's La Pietra del Paragone, at Glyndebourne in 1973 as the count in Richard Strauss's Capriccio, returning many times to perform works by Strauss and Mozart, and at the Metropolitan Opera in New York in 1978–79 as Malatesta in Donizetti's Don Pasquale. He began his career associated with relatively light roles and expanded his repertoire to include Guglielmo in Mozart's Così fan tutte, Count Almaviva in Mozart's Le Nozze di Figaro, Figaro in Rossini's Il Barbiere di Siviglia, Rodrigo in Verdi's Don Carlos, and Wolfram in Wagner's Tannhäuser. His operatic recordings include Die Zauberflöte, Puccini's La Bohème (as Schaunard), and an operatic recital, and he performed the baritone solos in Robert Shaw's 1980 recording of Orff's Carmina Burana.

He made his début as a lieder singer in Stockholm in 1970, singing Schubert's Die Winterreise and has since given lieder recitals all over Europe. He has premiered song cycles by composers including Dominick Argento and Stephen Paulus.

He has been Senior Lecturer in Music at the Indiana University Bloomington School of Music and was a professor at the Norwegian Academy of Music in Oslo and the first occupant of the Birgit Nilsson chair in singing at the Royal College of Music in Stockholm until 2018.

He established the Hagegården Music Centre, a retreat for performing artists, in the 1990s and the Singers Studio, on the model of the New York Actors Studio, in Stockholm in 2010.

== Honours ==
Hagegård's recordings have four times won a Swedish Gramophone Prize.

Hagegård was appointed court vocalist to King Carl XVI Gustaf of Sweden in 1985 and elected to the Royal Swedish Academy of Music in 1989. In 1993 he was awarded the medal Litteris et Artibus. He is also a member of the Värmland Academy.

Awards he has received include the Swedish Läkerol's Culture Prize in 1976; the medal of the Gustaf Fröding Society in 1986; the Mårbacka Prize in 1992; and the International Scandinavian Cultural Award of the Scandinavian-American Hall of Fame at Norsk Høstfest 1996. In 2000, he was awarded an honorary doctorate by Karlstad University.

== Personal life ==
Hagegård was formerly married to the American soprano Barbara Bonney, and has two children. Erland Hagegård, also an opera singer, is his cousin.

== Discography ==
- Zueignung – Dedication, BIS, 1976
- Puccini: La Bohème, Philips, 1979
- Håkan Hagegård sjunger Olle Adolphson, 1981
- Schubert: Winterreise, RCA, 1983
- Schumann: Liederkreis; Eight songs, RCA, 1986
- Håkan Hagegård Sings Operatic Arias and Swedish Ballads, Caprice Records, 1988
- Mozart: Le nozze di Figaro, L'Oiseau-Lyre, 1988
- Rodgers: The Sound of Music, conducted by Erich Kunzel, Telarc, 1988
- Psalms by Grieg and Mendelssohn, Nimbus, 1989
- Paulus: Songs, Albany Music Distribution, 1990
- Mozart: Don Giovanni, L'Oiseau-Lyre, 1990
- Brahms: Ein Deutsches Requiem, RCA, 1990
- Haydn: The Seasons, Koch International Classics, 1991
- Mahler: Symphony No. 1; Lieder Eines Fahrenden Gesellen, Teldec, 1992
- Ture Rangström: Sånger, Music Svecias, 1993
- Rossini: Il Barbiere di Siviglia, 1993
- Songs, Volume 1 & 2, BMG, 1993
- Wolf: Italienisches Liederbuch, Teldec 1994
- Schubert: Die Schöne Müllerin, RCA Victor Red Seal, 1994
- Orff: Carmina Burana, RCA, 1995
- Zemlinsky: Lyrische Symphonie, 1995
- Strauss: Capriccio, Decca, 1995
- Songs of Brahms, Sibelius and Stenhammar, RCA, 1997
- Faure Requiem, RCA, 1997
- Lucia - En klassisk högtid
- Klassisk Jul, Gazell Productions, 2002
- Edward Grieg: Sigurd Jorsalfar, BIS, 2004
- Mahler: Lieder eines fahrenden Gesellen; Des Knaben Wunderhord; Kindertotenlieder, 2008
- Jul Med Adolf Fredrik, AIS
- Schubert: Schwanengesang, RCA
- Contrasts: Lieder & Folksongs, Proprius-Audiosource

== Videography ==
- Carmen, Role: Zuniga (1973)
- The Magic Flute (1975), Ingmar Bergman, Role: Papageno
- L'Incoronazione di Poppea (1978), Role: Otho
- Cosi fan Tutte (1978), Role: Guglielmo
- Don Pasquale (1979), Role: Dr. Malatesta, Metropolitan Opera, Great Performances at the Met
- Die Fledermaus (1986), Role: Eisenstein, Metropolitan Opera, Great Performances at the Met
- Don Giovanni (1987), Role: Don Giovanni
- Meeting Venus (1991) Role: Wolfram von Eschenbach (highlights)
- The Ghosts of Versailles (1992), Role: Beaumarchais
- Capriccio (1993), Role: The Count
- The Rake's Progress (1995), Role: Nick Shadow
- James Levine's 25th Anniversary Metropolitan Opera Gala (1996), Deutsche Grammophon DVD, B0004602-09
- Die Fledermaus (2003), Role: Falke
