= Josef Köstlinger =

Austrian tenor

Josef Köstlinger (born 24 October 1946) is an Austrian operatic tenor.

== Life ==
Born in Braunau am Inn, Köstlinger attended the teacher training college in Salzburg. In 1968 he came to Sweden and took up singing studies in Stockholm. He was engaged in the chamber choir of the Swedish Radio Orchestra. He worked there with Eric Ericson. He sang at the world premiere of the opera Tintomara by Lars Johan Werle on 18 January 1973. He became known in 1975 in the role of Tamino in Ingmar Bergman's adaptation of the Mozart opera The Magic Flute.

In 1974 he was invited to the Salzburger Landestheater, where he performed for 30 years. At first he sang lyrical, later also buffo and character roles. He also sang at the Salzburg Festival.

He participated in several world premieres:

- 11 March 1984: Franz Hummel: Ubu Roi at the Landestheater Salzburg
- 20 November 1993: Gerhard Schedl: Glaube, Liebe, Hoffnung also at the Landestheater Salzburg

He has always been committed to contemporary music.

He is father of the actress Maria Köstlinger.
