= Barbara Bonney =

American soprano

- Born: April 14, 1956 (age 70); Montclair, New Jersey, United States
- Occupations: Classical soprano; academic
- Years active: 1979–present
- Organization: Mozarteum University Salzburg

Barbara Bonney (born April 14, 1956) is an American soprano. She is associated with lyric soprano roles in operas by Mozart and Richard Strauss as well as lieder performances.

== Early life ==
Bonney was born in Montclair, New Jersey. As a child she practised piano and cello. When Bonney was 13 her family moved to Maine, where she became part of the Portland Symphony Youth Orchestra as a cellist. She spent two years at the University of New Hampshire (UNH) studying German and music including voice with Patricia Stedry, and spent her junior year at the University of Salzburg, where she switched from cello to voice. While there, she studied at Mozarteum University Salzburg. Years later she received an honorary doctorate from UNH.

== Career ==
In 1979, Bonney joined the Staatstheater Darmstadt, where she made her debut as Anna in The Merry Wives of Windsor. In the subsequent five years she made appearances in Germany and throughout Europe, notably at the Royal Opera House at Covent Garden in London and La Scala in Milan. She made her Metropolitan Opera debut in 1987 in Richard Strauss's Ariadne auf Naxos in the role of Naiad and her Vienna State Opera debut the same year as Sophie in Der Rosenkavalier. Since then, she has appeared at the major opera houses of the world and at the Salzburg Festival, where she was Servilia in Mozart's La clemenza di Tito.

Along with her repertoire in opera as a lyric soprano, she is a distinguished recitalist, and has appeared on more than 90 recordings, including 15 solo recitals. For two years, starting in 1999, Bonney did not perform in opera, to focus on lieder recitals. However, she noted that solo recitals lacked the camaraderie of performing in an opera production with many other people. In 2002, she contributed "The Willow Song" to the compilation album, When Love Speaks (EMI Classics), which features famous actors and musicians interpreting Shakespeare's sonnets and play excerpts. Other albums include her 2006 work on Welcome to the Voice, composed by Steve Nieve.

On August 1, 2006, IMG Artists announced that all forthcoming appearances by Bonney were cancelled and that they would no longer be representing her. At the time, the IMG Artists website only stated the reason as "due to personal circumstances", but Bonney stated in a July 2007 article that those circumstances included her "difficult" divorce from Maurice Whitaker. She had previously been married to Håkan Hagegård for seven years; that marriage had also ended in divorce.

Bonney is a member of the Royal Swedish Academy of Music and is a visiting professor in the Royal Academy of Music, London. She is a member of the faculty of Mozarteum University Salzburg, as University Professor of Singing and a member of the faculty of the American Institute of Musical Studies in Graz, Austria.

Bonney opened a boutique clothing store based in Salzburg, LUNA Dress Design, on her 55th birthday in 2011. The brand is currently called "Bonney & Kleid".
