= Drottningholm Palace Theatre =

Opera house in Stockholm, Sweden

- Drottningholms slottsteater
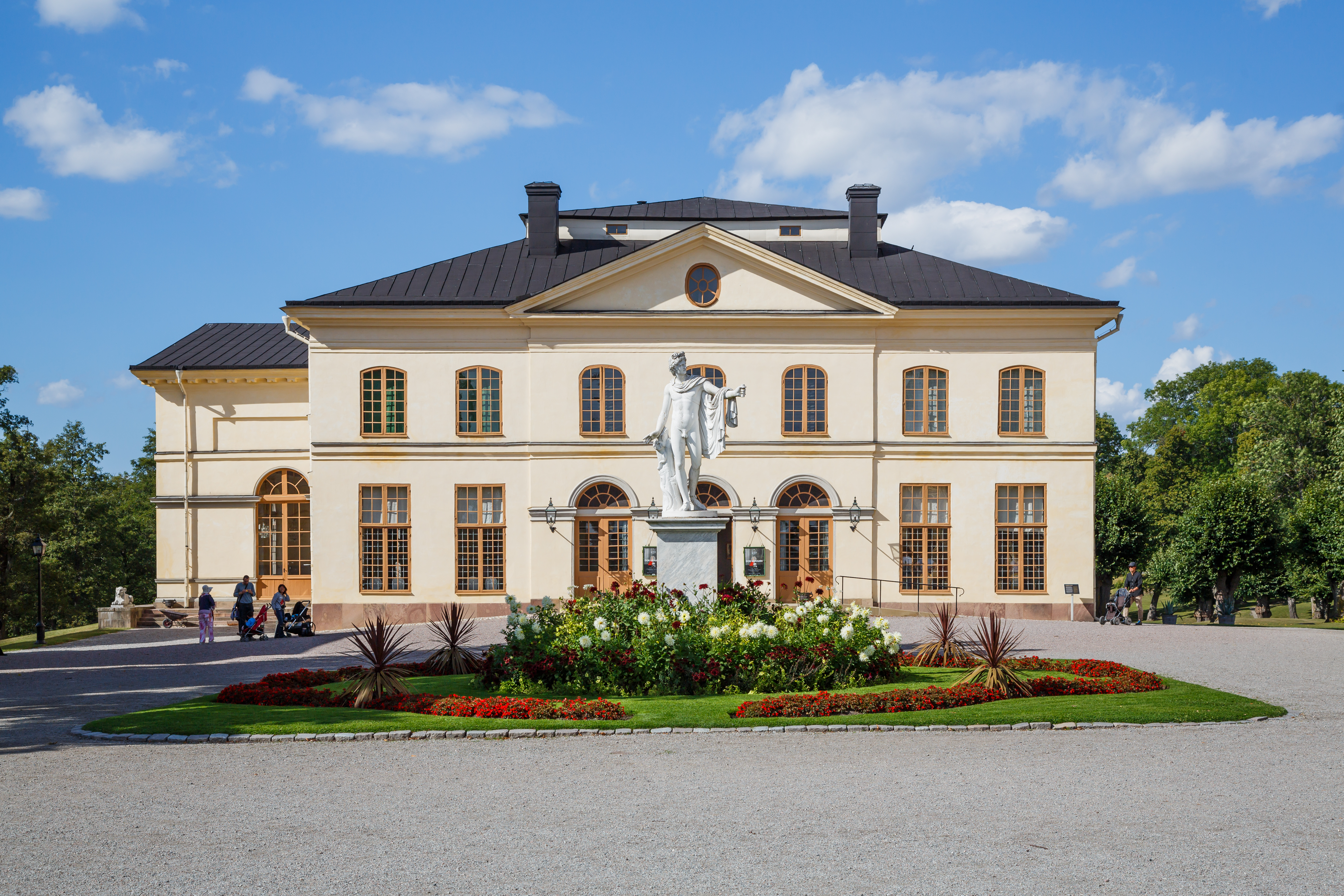
- Drottningholms slottsteater, exterior
- Interactive map of Drottningholm Palace Theatre
- Address: Drottningholm Palace; Drottningholm; Sweden
- Coordinates: 59°19′23″N 17°53′06″E
- Owner: Drottningholm Theatre Museum Foundation
- Operator: Drottningholm Theatre Museum
- Type: Opera house

Construction
- Opened: 1766
- Rebuilt: 1764–1766 (after the 1762 fire)
- Years active: 1766–1771; 1777–1792; 1922–present
- Architect: Carl Fredrik Adelcrantz

UNESCO World Heritage Site
- Official name: Part of the Royal Domain of Drottningholm
- Type: Cultural
- Criteria: iv
- Reference no.: 559
- Country: Sweden
- Region: Europe and North America

The Drottningholm Palace Theatre (Swedish: Drottningholms slottsteater) is an opera house located at Drottningholm Palace in Stockholm, Sweden. It is one of the few 18th-century theatres in Europe that is still used as a theatre with its original stage machinery.

== History ==
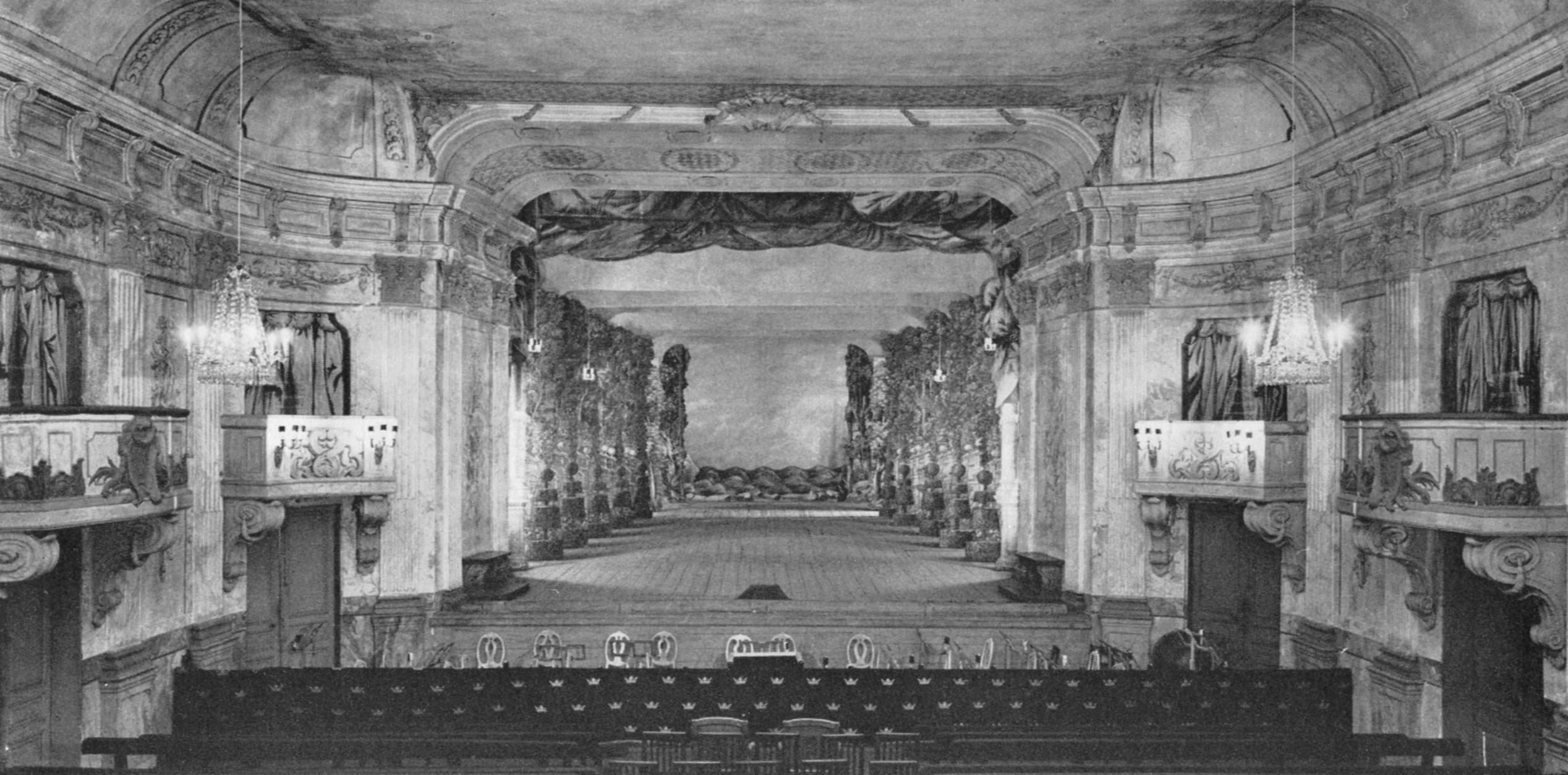
Interior of the theatre, 1966 photo

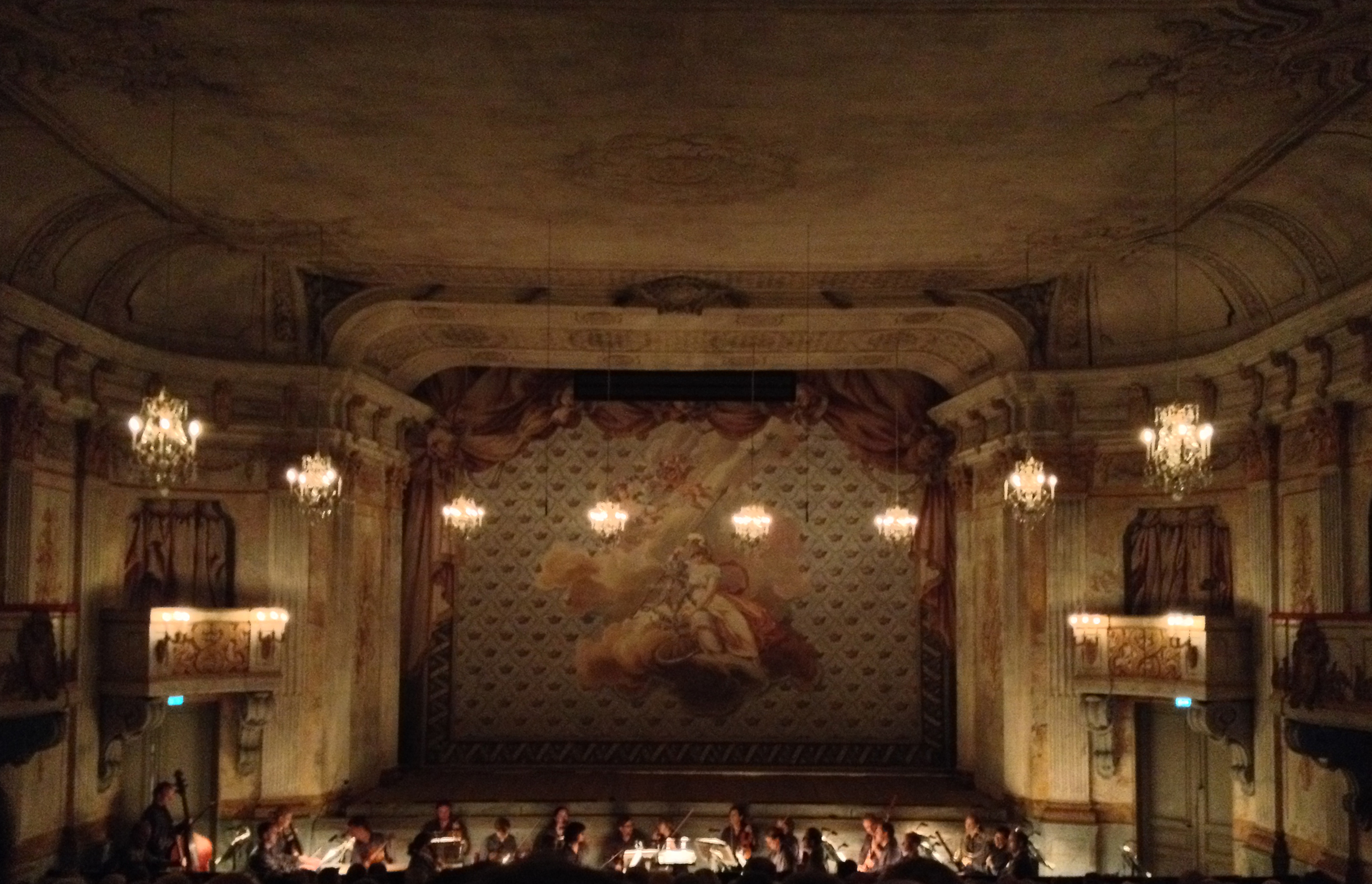
Interior of Drottningholm Palace Theatre

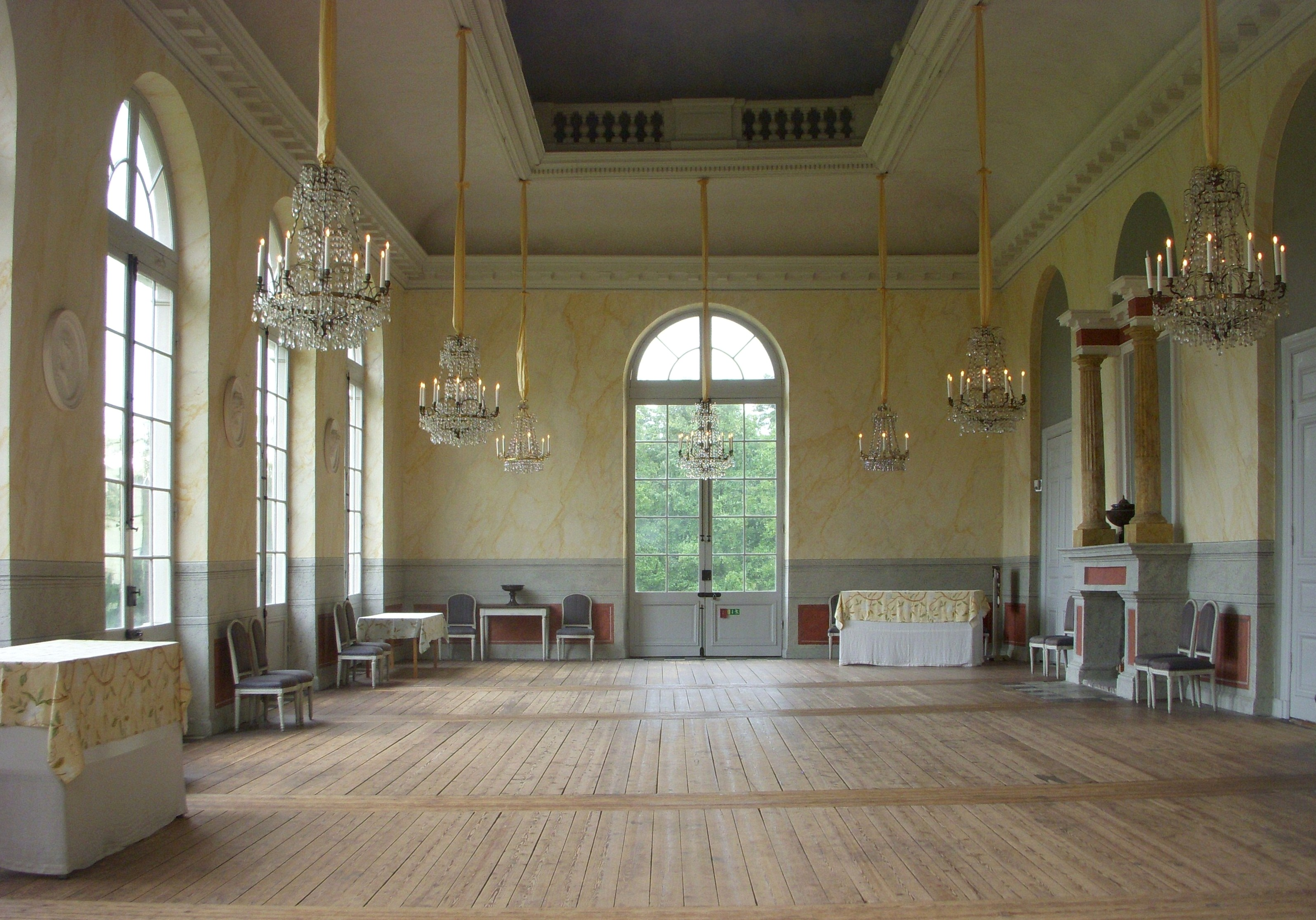
Dejeuner Salon, built during King Gustav III's reign and today used as the theatre's foyer

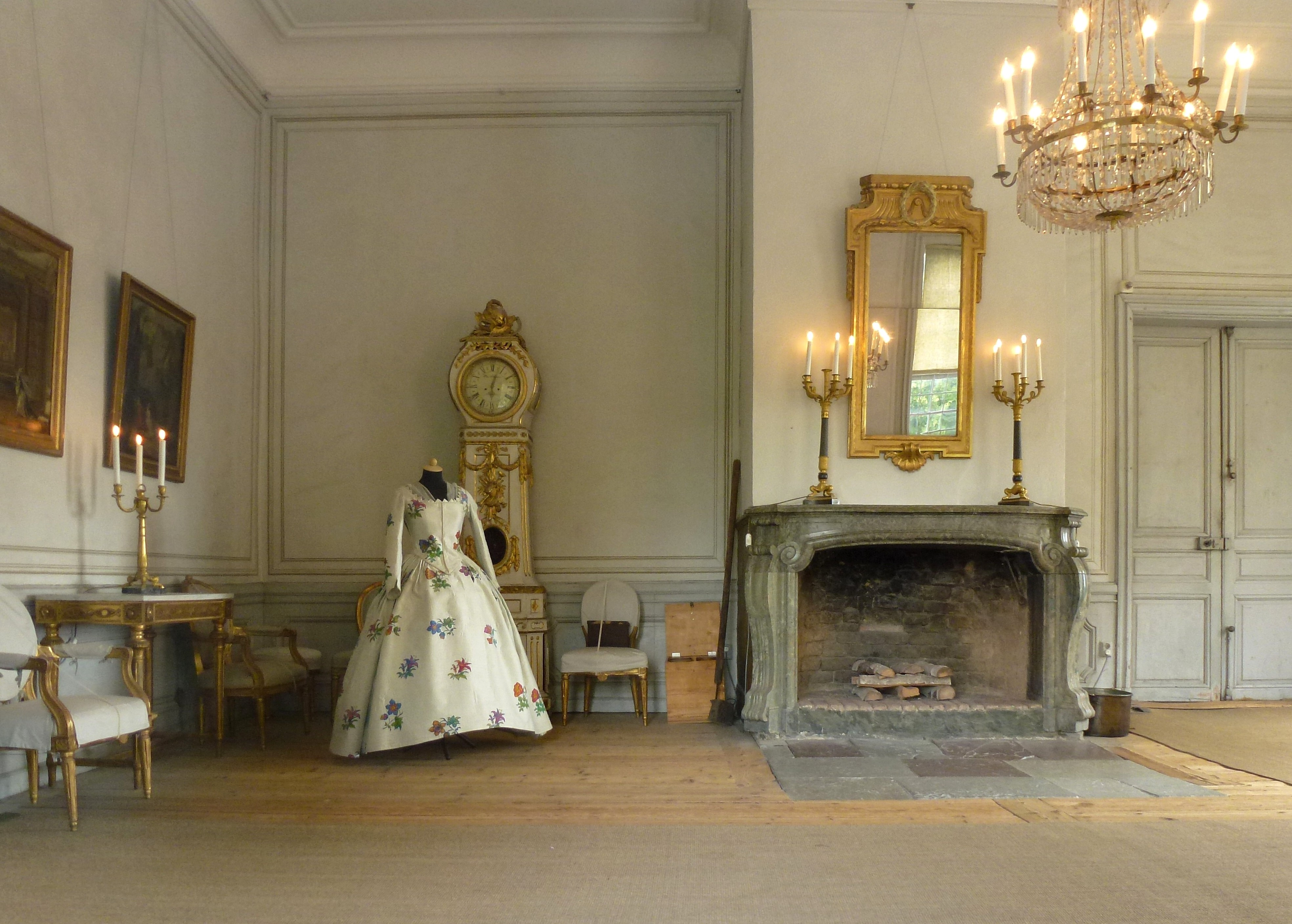
Dressing-room

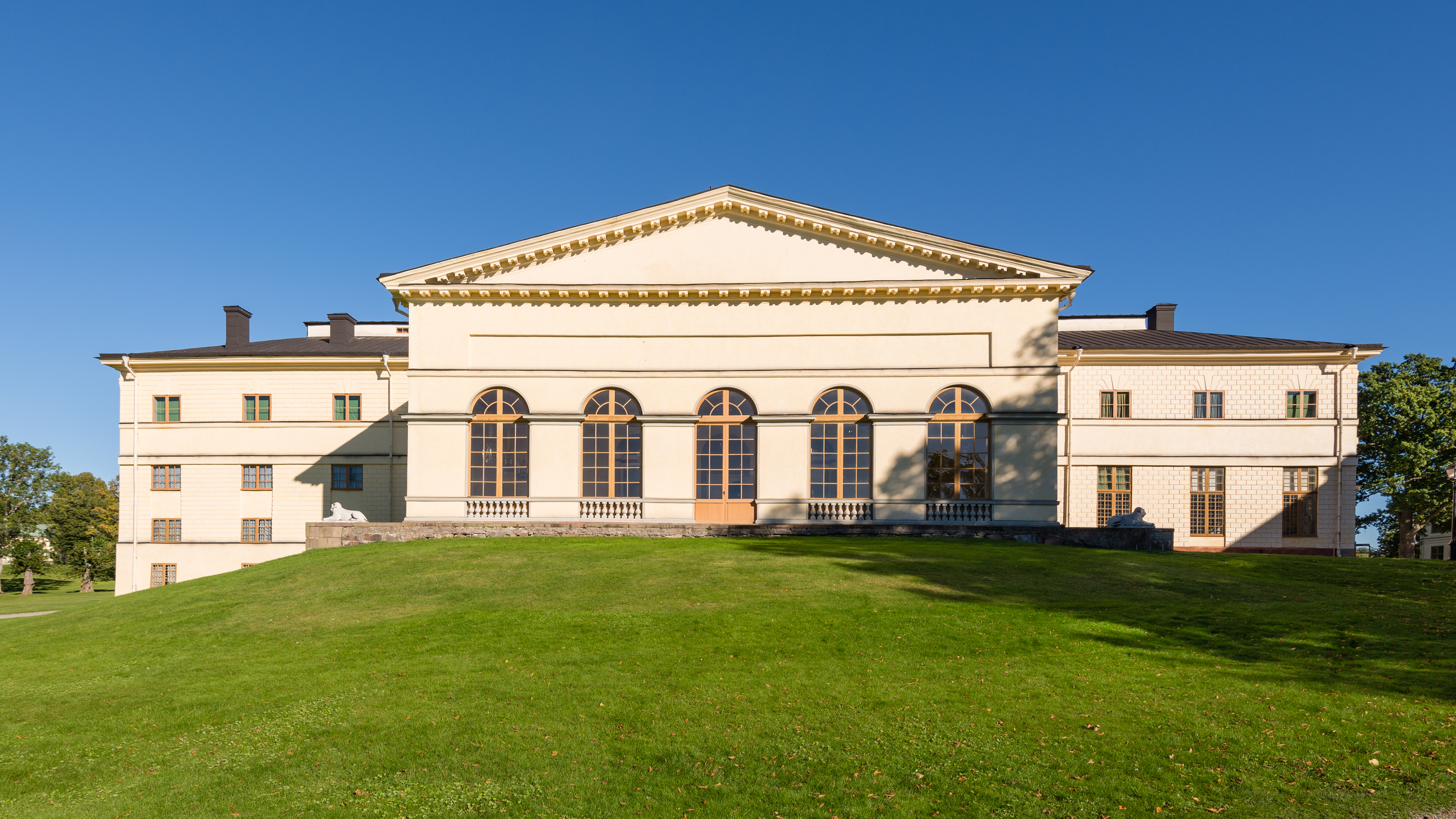
Drottningholm Palace Theatre in 2015

The first theatre to be built on the Drottningholm site was built at the behest of Queen Lovisa Ulrika by the German master builder Georg Greggenhofer (1718 or 1719–1779). The theatre opened in 1754 and hosted a new troupe of French actors, the Du Londel Troupe, that had been engaged by the court a year earlier and was to use the theatre until 1771. The troupe used the theatre in the summer months to show French theatre and Italian opera for the Queen and her court.

When the original theatre burned down on 27 August 1762 during the performance of a comic opera, Queen Lovisa Ulrika quickly decided to rebuild a theatre for the Drottningholm Palace court, commissioning a replacement opera house by Carl Fredrik Adelcrantz. Work began on the building in 1764, and it eventually included the theatre as well as a complex of smaller chambers off the main auditorium to house members of the court who did not stay at the palace, including Adelcrantz, the master of the revels, the noble chambermaids, the actors and staff of the theatre, and young aristocrats. The building that Adelcrantz created was unusual architecturally in several respects. Most notably, although the theatre was intended to mimic Versailles's artistic style, the lack of funds of the Swedish Treasury forced a much sparser style. The exterior of the building is very plain in comparison to other palatial theatres, in the style of a country manor with no indication from the exterior that an opera house is inside. The interior, decorated by Adrien Masreliez, uses trompe l'oeil, papier-mâché, and stucco to imitate more expensive materials like marble and gold. The theatre is also architecturally unusual for its shape, since the auditorium is shaped like a T with the two thrones for the reigning monarchs placed in the cross of the T in front of the stage and the rest of the court seated on wooden benches. The stage is also unusually deep, 27 by 57 ft (8.2 by 17.4 m), which helped the set designers to create optical illusions of great distance on the stage.

For scholars, the most important part of the theatre, however, is not the architectural uniqueness of the space, but instead the stage machinery that is a rare surviving example of common stage effects from its time. The machinery for the theatre was possibly designed by the Italian Donato Stopani, although some historians think the designer may have been George Fröman, master builder for the court who studied similar stage machinery when he travelled through Europe in 1755. One of the stage machines that is still intact and in use in the theatre is the chariot-and-pole system, which helps to change scenes quickly by sliding the wings with wheels ("chariots") on tracks in the floor, controlled by a capstan under the stage ("pole"). The theatre has an unusually large number of wings, with a total of four possible scene changes in a single performance, but the chariot-and-pole system allows a scene change in as little as six seconds. Other machines that are still used in the theatre are purely for special effects, including a wave machine consisting of giant painted corkscrews that are turned to simulate a rough sea, a thunder machine to create storm sound effects, and a flying chair which is often used for "deus ex machina" effects. Lighting is controlled by turning metal sconces and their candles toward or away from the stage.

In 1766, the theatre was opened by Queen Lovisa Ulrika, and there were several performances that included court members and the royal family as actors celebrating the occasion. The theatre was used every summer by the court until 1771, when Adolf Frederik died and the French acting troupe he had imported was dismissed. The theatre remained unused until 1777, when Queen Lovisa Ulrika gave it to her son King Gustav III. King Gustav was deeply interested in the theatre, hiring an acting troupe, and even writing and directing several works at Drottningholm. The theatre that was performed under King Gustav was a departure from the theatre of his predecessors, since although French and Italian theatre was still performed, he encouraged the use of Swedish stories and language to create a new operatic tradition. He also made some alterations to the theatre building itself, adding the Dejeuner Salon that is used as the foyer today. After the assassination of King Gustav III in 1792 (which is the basis of the Giuseppe Verdi opera Un ballo in maschera), the theatre was used as a storage room for Drottningholm Palace's unused furniture.

== 20th-century restoration and revival ==
In 1921, Swedish theatre historian Agne Beijer rediscovered Drottningholm Theatre and, with royal permission, preserved what was left of the theatre's interior and stage machinery. Some small changes were made, including the addition of electric lights, which were designed to flicker like candles, the replacement of the original ropes that moved the machinery, and the substitution of replicas for delicate backdrops. Most of the theatre, however, was unchanged from the original design, and much of the stucco work and original wallpaper remains today. The theatre re-opened on 19 August 1922. Until 1935, performances were limited to occasional showcases for visiting scholars, usually including dances performed by the Swedish Ballet School. In 1935, the theatre began to host seasonal performances, starting with three ballad operas by Arvid Niclas von Höpken, Joseph Martin Kraus and Carl Michael Bellman. In 1951, the Royal Swedish Opera became the permanent company performing in Drottningholm Theatre, using the space for their summer performances. In 1953, the Royal Swedish Ballet joined in partnership with the Opera, and the company's new director, Mary Skeaping, pushed the dancers to revive the 17th- and 18th-century court ballet style. In August 1998, a Gluck programme was staged, including Paris and Helen with Magdalena Kožená singing Paris, Alceste in the Italian version and the ballet Don Juan. The first new opera to be premiered at the theatre in modern times was Jonas Forssell's Trädgården (The Garden) in July 1999, conducted by Roy Goodman, with Malena Ernman in the trouser role of Ziöberg.

Today, a private foundation, the Drottningholm Theatre Museum, funded by government and private grants, runs the theatre, performing operas in the summer months. The operas are often performed by musicians wearing period costume, and the orchestra performs using period or copies of authentic instruments. Most productions demonstrate some of the possible stage effects using the original equipment. The theatre remains a place to train musicians, dancers, and opera singers in Baroque style.

In 1991, the theatre, along with the Drottningholm Palace (the residence of the Swedish royal family), the Chinese Pavilion and the surrounding park, became the first Swedish patrimony to be inscribed in the UNESCO list of World Heritage Sites. Parts of the palace, the pavilion and the theatre are open to the public for tours.

Recent artistic directors of the theatre are Arnold Östman (1980–92), Elisabeth Söderström (1993–96), Per-Erik Öhrn (1996–2006). Mark Tatlow (2007–2013). Sofi Lerström, the theatre's managing director from 2011, took over as artistic director in 2013. It is under her direction that took place a widely acclaimed (then touring) "Mozart – Da Ponte Trilogy" conducted by Marc Minkowski and staged by Ivan A. Alexandre. Mezzo-soprano Ann Hallenberg was artist in residence in 2019 and 2020. Her choice of repertoire for 2019 was Ariodante conducted by Ian Page.

== As featured in Bergman's The Magic Flute ==
A copy of the theatre is visible in Ingmar Bergman's 1975 film version of The Magic Flute. According to film historian Peter Cowie's notes for the DVD release of the film, Bergman wanted to recreate as closely as possible the original 1791 production in the Theater auf der Wieden in Vienna, and originally hoped to film in the Drottningholm Theatre. However, "the scenery was considered too fragile to accommodate a film crew. So the stage – complete with wings, curtains, and wind machines – was painstakingly copied and erected in the studios of the Swedish Film Institute". Introductory exterior shots of the theatre are, however, visible in the film.

== See also ==
- List of opera festivals
- Royal Swedish Opera
- Royal Swedish Academy of Music
- Culture of Sweden
- History of Sweden
- Bollhuset
