= Singoalla =

Singoalla may refer to:

- Singoalla (novel), a novel written by Swedish author Viktor Rydberg
- Singoalla (opera), by Gunnar de Frumerie, 1940, opera based on the novel.
- Singoalla (film), a 1949 film based on the novel
- Singoalla (album), a music album by Joakim Thåström and Hell
- Singoalla, a Swedish brand of shortbread biscuit with raspberry, citrus, licorice or blueberry filling and cream with vanilla flavour.
- Singoalla 34, a Swedish sailboat design.
