= Anahit Bayandur =

Armenian translator and activist (1940–2011)

- Անահիտ Բայանդուր
- Born: 15 February 1940; Yerevan, Armenian SSR, Soviet Union
- Died: 7 January 2011 (aged 70); Yerevan, Armenia
- Education: Maxim Gorky Literature Institute
- Occupations: Translator; Human rights activist Politician
- Years active: 1962–2011
- Political party: Pan-Armenian National Movement
- Mother: Maro Markarian

Anahit Sargsi Bayandur (Armenian: Անահիտ Սարգսի Բայանդուր; 15 February 1940 – 7 January 2011) was an Armenian translator and human rights activist. She first became known for her work translating works of modern Armenian literature into Russian, bringing greater international attention to writers such as Hrant Matevosyan. In 1988, following the start of the Karabakh movement, she became an activist for peace and reconciliation between Armenia and Azerbaijan over Nagorno-Karabakh, for which she was jointly awarded the Olof Palme Prize with Azerbaijani activist Arzu Abdullayeva.

== Personal life ==
Bayandur was born on 15 February 1940 in Yerevan, the capital of what was then the Armenian Soviet Socialist Republic within the Soviet Union. Her father, Sarkis Bayandur, was a playwright and critic, while her mother, Maro Markarian, was a noted poet and translator. In 1962, Bayandur graduated from the Maxim Gorky Literature Institute in Moscow, Russia, with a degree in literature and translation.

On 7 January 2011, Bayandur died in Yerevan at the age of 71. The Armenian National Congress issued a statement expressing its condolences at her death, praising her contributions to the fields of both Armenian literature and Nagorno-Karabakh.

== Translation career ==
Bayandur translated the works of various Armenian writers into Russian, increasing accessibility to Armenian literature beyond Armenia. This included novels and short stories by Derenik Demirchian, Gurgen Mahari, Zorayr Khalapyan, Hrachya Kochar, Stepan Zoryan and Hovhannes Tumanyan. She was awarded the Order of Friendship of Peoples, recognising the strengthening of inter-ethnic and international friendship and cooperation, for her translation of a collection of works by Hrant Matevosyan.

Between 1970 until its dissolution in 1991, Bayandur was a member of the Union of Soviet Writers. From 1991, she joined its Russian successor, the Union of Moscow Writers; she was also a member of the Union of Writers of Armenia from 1970 until her death.

== Activism ==
In 1988, a national liberation movement emerged in Armenia and Nagorno-Karabakh (an autonomous enclave within the Azerbaijan SSR with a majority Armenian population) that advocated for the unification of the Nagorno-Karabakh Autonomous Oblast with the Armenian SSR. Bayandur became a member of the Pan-Armenian National Movement, which derived from the leadership of the movement. The movement led to conflict with Azerbaijan, which led to the First Nagorno-Karabakh War from 1988 until 1992. While Bayandur was supportive of unification, she advocated against warfare between Armenia and Azerbaijan, stating that conflict resolution could not be achieved through military means; she advocated for respectful dialogue, peaceful conflict resolution, and reconciliation. With Azerbaijani activist Arzu Abdullayeva, Bayandur successfully campaigned for the release of 500 people in captivity on both the Armenian and Azerbaijani sides of the conflict; in 1992, Bayandur travelled to Baku, the capital of Azerbaijan, giving a speech declaring that Azerbaijanis and Armenians were not enemies. For her work during the conflict, Bayandur was jointly awarded the Olof Palme Prize alongside Abdullayeva. Following the end of the war, Bayandur repeatedly called for the withdrawal of Armenian soldiers from Armenian-occupied territories surrounding Nagorno-Karabakh.

Bayandur went on to co-found and co-chair the Armenian committee of the Helsinki Citizens' Assembly with Natalia Martirosyan. In the early 21st-century, Bayandur called for activists in Armenia, Azerbaijan and Georgia to demand that the international community put pressure on Russia to change its policy towards the Caucasus. She also called on Armenian reconciliation with Turkey, with relations between the countries strained over differing stances on the Armenian genocide; Bayandur travelled to Istanbul with an Armenian delegation, discussing reopening the border between the countries and trade prospects.

== Political career ==
In 1990, Bayandur was one of eight women elected among 260 deputies to the Supreme Council of Armenia as a member of the Pan-Armenian National Movement, serving between 1990 and 1995. During her term, she was a member of the foreign relations committee.

During the 2008 presidential election and subsequent protests, calling on the President of Armenia, Robert Kocharyan, and the Prime Minister and president-elect, Serzh Sargsyan, to leave Armenia, criticising them for corruption. The article went viral during the protests and was reprinted in various media outlets.

== Legacy ==
In December 2011, a prize recognising young female peacemakers in the Caucuses was established, named after Bayandur. The Armenian Institute of International and Security Affairs, a research institute focused on human rights and political freedom, named its training programme after Bayandur.
