= Bruce Harris =

Bruce Harris may refer to:

- Bruce Harris (politician), mayor of Chatham Borough, New Jersey
- Bruce Harris (journalist) (1887–1960), English sports journalist
- Bruce C. Harris (1955–2010), British charity executive

== See also ==
- John Bruce Harris (1903–1983), politician in Saskatchewan
- Bruce Harris Craven, American novelist, screenwriter, and educator.
- Bryce Harris (born 1989), American football player
