= Taikon =

Taikon is a surname. Notable people with the surname include:

- Katarina Taikon (1932–1995), Swedish Romani activist, writer, and actress
- Rosa Taikon (1926–2017), Swedish Romani silversmith and actress, sister of Katarina
