= Freedom Award =

Humanitarian award for freedom and refugees

- Awarded for: "extraordinary contributions to the cause of refugees and human freedom"
- Country: United States
- Presented by: International Rescue Committee
- First award: 1957
- Website: IRC Freedom Award

The International Rescue Committee (IRC) bestows its Freedom Award for extraordinary contributions to the cause of refugees and human freedom. According to the IRC, "The Freedom Award reveals the remarkable ability of an individual to shape history and change for the better a world moving toward freedom for all."

The IRC was founded in 1933 at the request of Albert Einstein, and made its first Freedom Award in 1957, to German politician Willy Brandt, who went on to win the Nobel Peace Prize. The following year, the award was presented to Winston Churchill, British prime minister during the Second World War, for his "dedicated and devoted service to the cause of human liberty". The first joint recipients of the award were Lane Kirkland and his wife Irena who won the prize in 1981. Lane was honored for his "long devotion to the cause of refugees" while Irena was described as "very much a human rights activist". Chinese dissidents Li Shuxian and Fang Lizhi were jointly honored in 1991; two American Presidents, George H. W. Bush and Bill Clinton took the prize as a pair in 2005, and film actress Angelina Jolie and United Nations High Commissioner for Refugees High Commissioner António Guterres received the award together in 2007.

Since the first award presentation in 1957, the IRC has made it to 46 recipients, 24 of which were American; the majority of awards have been to politicians. The 1995 presentation was made in absentia to Burmese pro-democracy campaigner and leader of the opposition National League for Democracy (NLD) party, Aung San Suu Kyi. The 2011 award ceremony was held in New York City, at the Waldorf-Astoria Hotel in November, where the presentation was made to the Brokaw family. In 2012, John C. Whitehead received the prize for a second time, the only person to do so.

== Recipients ==
| Year | Image | Recipient | Nationality | References |
|---|---|---|---|---|
| 1957 | A smiling, older man in a dark suit with a narrow-striped shirt and wide-striped tie. He has receding but long, wavy hair. | Willy Brandt | German | |
| 1958 | | Winston Churchill | British | |
| 1959 | | William Joseph Donovan | American | |
| 1960 | | Richard Evelyn Byrd | American | |
| 1965 | | George Meany | American | |
| 1966 | | David Dubinsky | American | |
| 1967 | | David Sarnoff | American | |
| 1969 | | Lucius D. Clay | American | |
| 1970 | | Jacob K. Javits | American | |
| 1975 | | Bruno Kreisky | Austrian | |
| 1976 | | Leo Cherne | American | |
| 1977 | | Hubert Humphrey | American | |
| 1978 | — | Joseph Buttinger | Austrian | |
| 1979 | — | Mary Pillsbury Lord^{[A]} | American | |
| 1981 | | Lane Kirkland; Irena Kirkland | American; American | |
| 1987 | | Elie Wiesel | Romanian | |
| 1987 | | John C. Whitehead | American | |
| 1989 | | Prince Sadruddin Aga Khan | French; Iranian; Swiss | |
| 1989 | | Lech Wałęsa | Polish | |
| 1990 | | Violeta Chamorro | Nicaraguan | |
| 1991 | | Fang Lizhi and Li Shuxian | Chinese; Chinese | |
| 1991 | | Javier Pérez de Cuéllar | Peruvian | |
| 1992 | | Cyrus Vance | American | |
| 1993 | | George Soros^{[B]} | Hungarian | |
| 1993 | — | Dwayne Andreas^{[C]} | American | |
| 1994 | — | Theodore J. Forstmann^{[B]} | American | |
| 1994 | | Felix Rohatyn^{[C]} | Austrian | |
| 1995 | | Aung San Suu Kyi^{[D]} | Burmese | |
| 1995 | | Sadako Ogata | Japanese | |
| 1995 | | Richard Holbrooke | American | |
| 1997 | — | Robert P. De Vecchi | American | |
| 1999 | | Madeleine Albright | American | |
| 2001 | | John McCain | American | |
| 2002 | — | Reynold Levy | American | |
| 2002 | | Hamid Karzai | Afghan | |
| 2003 | | Václav Havel | Czech | |
| 2004 | | Roméo Dallaire^{[B]} | Canadian | |
| 2005 | | George H.W. Bush; Bill Clinton | American; American | |
| 2006 | | Ellen Johnson Sirleaf | Liberian | |
| 2007 | | António Guterres; Angelina Jolie | Portuguese; American | |
| 2008 | | Kofi Annan | Ghanaian | |
| 2011 | | Brokaw family | American | |
| 2012 | | John C. Whitehead | American | |
| 2013 | | George Soros^{[B]} | Hungarian | |
| 2014 | | The humanitarian aid worker | | |
| 2015 | | Strive Masiyiwa | Zimbabwean | |
| 2016 | | Spyros Galinos | Greek | |
| 2017 | | Michael Bloomberg | American | |
| 2018 | | Diane von Fürstenberg | Belgian | |
| 2020 | | Samantha Power | Irish American | |
| 2021 | | Bryan Stevenson | American | |
| 2022 | | Syrian American Medical Society Foundation | | |
| 2023 | | Amartya Sen | Indian | |
| 2024 | | Denis Mukwege | Congolese | |
| 2025 | | Lynsey Addario | American | |

== Notes ==
- A Lord's award was made posthumously.
- B Distinguished Humanitarian Award
- C Distinguished Public Service Award
- D Special Freedom Award Recipient, in absentia
