= Pontus Carlsson =

Swedish chess grandmaster (born 1982)

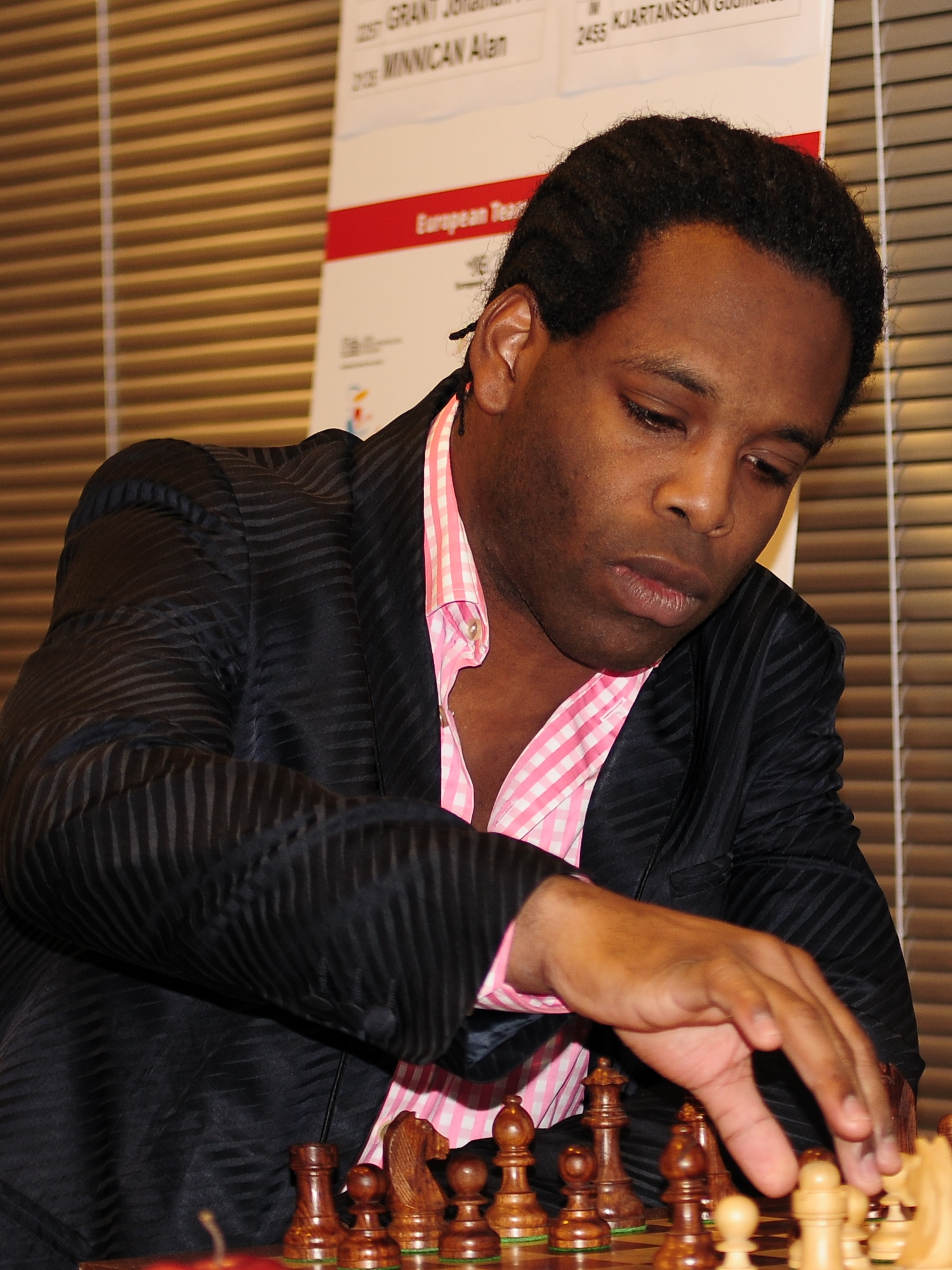
- Pontus Carlsson, Warsaw 2013

Personal information
- Born: December 18, 1982 (age 43) Cali, Colombia

Chess career
- Country: Sweden
- Title: Grandmaster (2007)
- FIDE rating: 2450 (October 2026)
- Peak rating: 2531 (May 2012)

Pontus Carlsson (born December 18, 1982) is a Swedish chess grandmaster.

== Early life ==
Carlsson was born December 18, 1982 in Cali, Colombia. At age one, Carlsson's family passed and he was taken to an orphanage. He was adopted by a former chairman of the Swedish Chess Federation, Ingvar Carlsson, who taught him chess at age four. In Sweden, Carlsson began playing chess nationally and internationally, representing the country in the 37th Chess Olympiad in Turin, Italy (+3=1−2) as an International Master. Along with representing his county internationally, Carlsson won youth championships both at the regional and national levels. He played in his first national championship in 2001 at age 18 in his hometown of Linköping.

Carlsson holds dual citizenship in Colombia and Sweden.

== Career ==
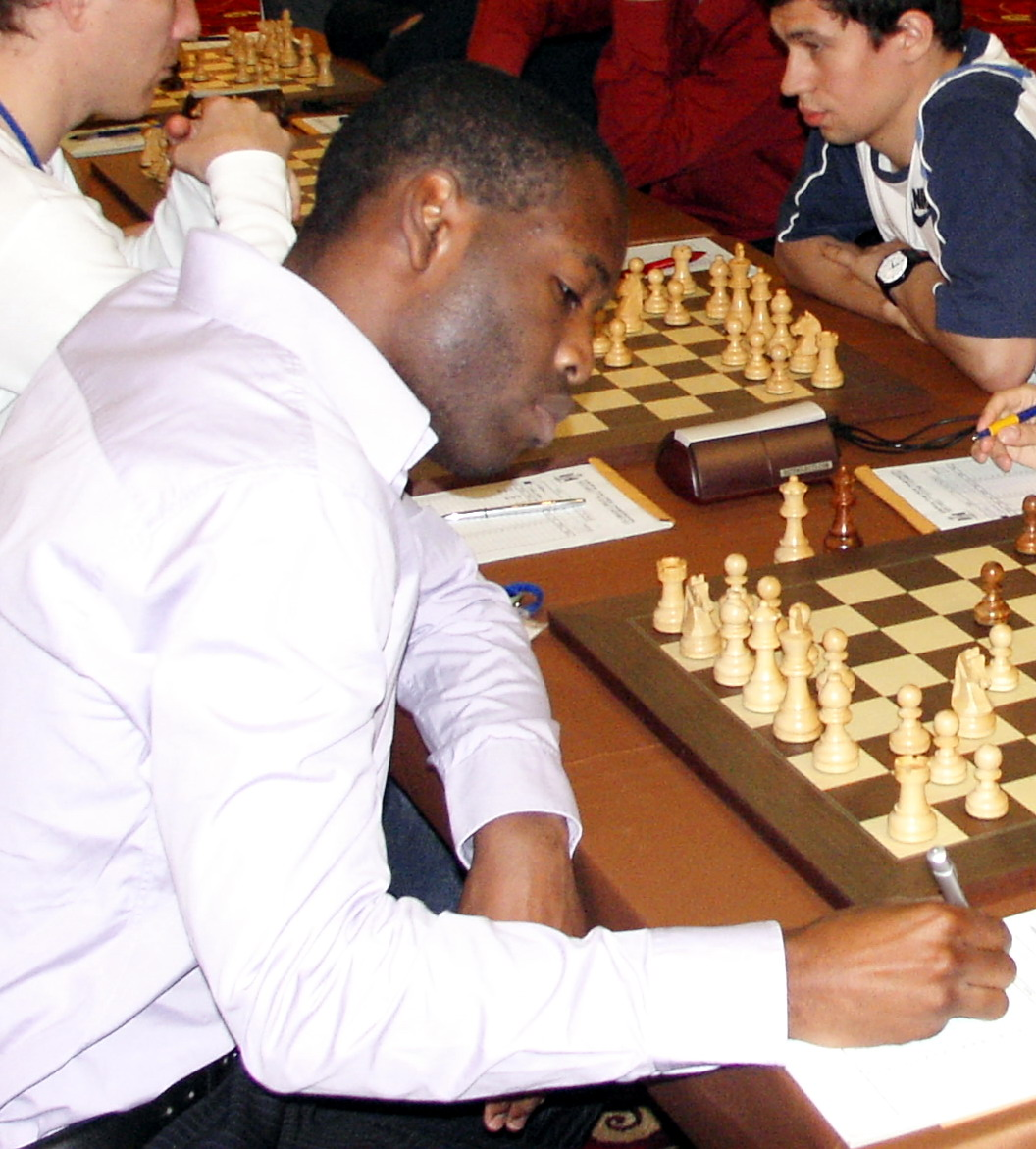
Pontus Carlsson, 2007

Carlsson continued to represent Sweden, as a member of the senior national team. He spent most of his career traveling throughout Europe. His first international tournament of record was the under-10 European Championships in Rimavská Sobota.

Carlsson is known for his playing in rapid chess, where he won the Swedish Tusenmannaschacket Rapid tournament three times, the only player in its history to do so.

His performance stagnated from mid-2001 to mid-2005 due to losing small amounts of rating points in successive tournaments. He attributed this delay to not playing enough tournaments and activating himself.

In 2007, Carlsson played for the Swedish national team in the 16th European Team Chess Championship and scored 6/9 without a loss. His performance rating was 2686, having played against Grandmasters Dmitry Jakovenko and Mark Hebden.

He plays for the Sollentuna SK chess club, with which he took part in the European club cups in 2002, 2005, and 2007. Beyond the Swedish league he also played in the Spanish league and other tournaments in Spain.

Carlsson became an International Master and Grandmaster within a period of three years. He achieved the International Master title in August 2005, and the grandmaster title in October 2007 after earning four GM norms. Making him the 16th Swede to become a GM. He earned his first GM norm at the 2005 European Team Championship, his second at the Open de Tarragona (Spain), the third at the Torneig Internacional Ciutat de Sóller, and the fourth in the 3rd round at the European Club Cup. As a Grandmaster, he was elected into the Swedish Chess Academy.

== Quotes ==
- "The training that I have done this far have taken me to 2500, but in order to reach 2600 I need to work hard on my weaknesses."
- "Before that I only played two or max three ELO tournaments per year. Between 2001 and 2004 I had problems to reach my normal playing strength during the tournaments since I was too rusty all the time. I always started the tournaments bad and then when I got warm and recovered, the tournament was over and it was a half year left to the next one. I had 2400 in 2001 and in 2004 I had 2360 after losing five ELO points in almost every tournament that I played during this period. Therefore I decided to activate myself and start to play more and a bit more serious."
- "No I don't think so. I mean there are only two black GMs in the world and I'm the only one that plays in Europe so everyone knows who I am. It's not possible for me to hide!" (when asked if international opponents are surprised when placing his name and country with his face)
