= Maro Markarian =

Soviet poet and translator (1915–1999)

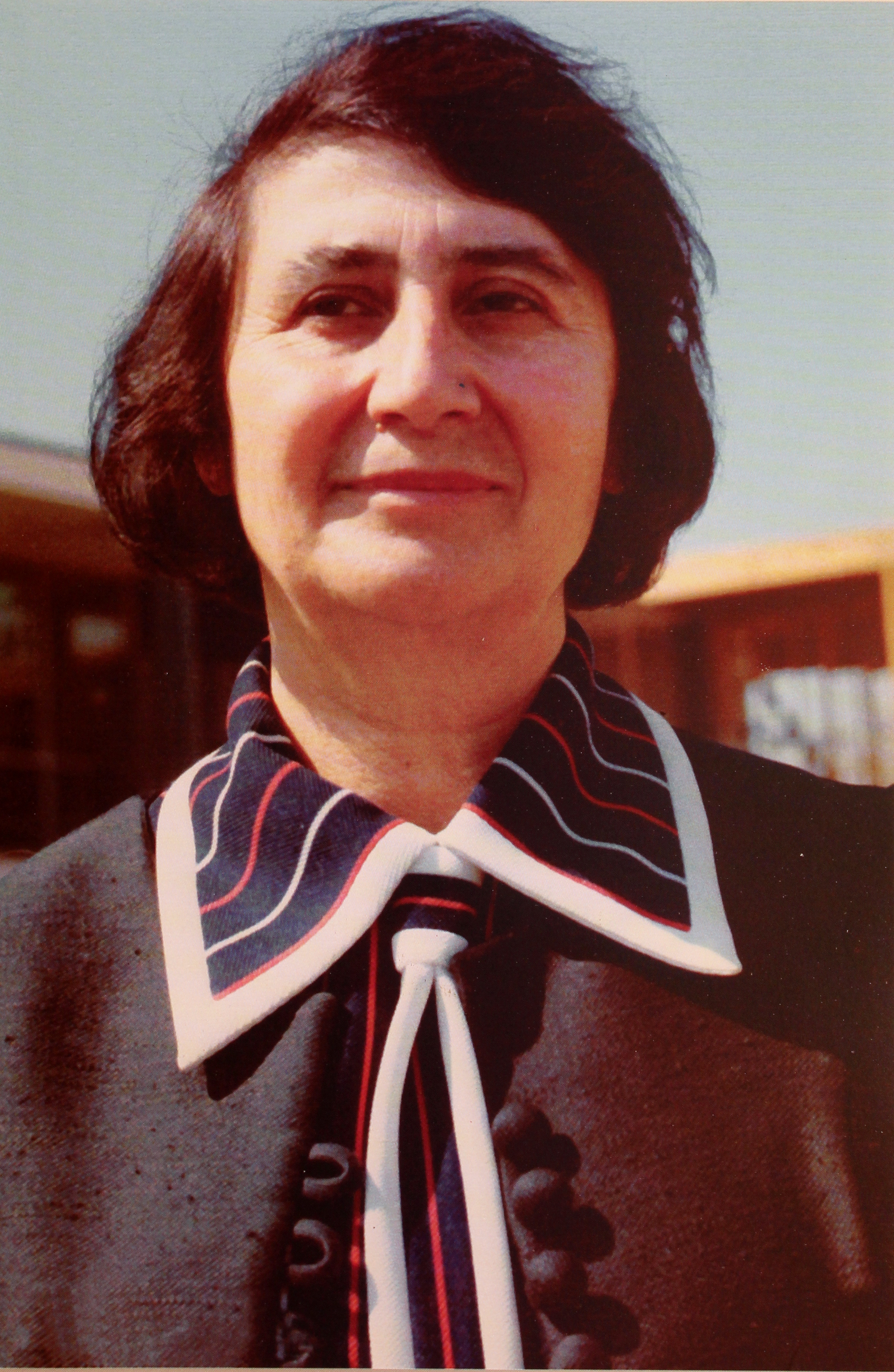
- Born: December 22, 1915; Shulaver, Marneuli region, Georgia
- Died: January 28 or 29, 1999; Yerevan, Armenia
- Burial place: Byurakan, Armenia
- Known for: Armenian poet
- Notable work: Felix Bakhchinyan, Kingdom of Nostalgia, Yerevan, 2003. Naira Hambardzumyan, Maro Markarian's lyric poetry, Yerevan, 2003.
- Spouse: Sargis Bayandur
- Children: Anahit and Ashot Bayandur
- Relatives: Benjamin Markarian (brother)
- Awards: Order of Friendship of Peoples, 1985 Laureate of the USSR State Prize (1983, for the collection of poems "Donations") Laureate of the Avetik Isahakyan Prize 1981 (for the collection of poems "Donations")

Maro Yeghishe Markarian (Armenian: Մարո Եղիշեի Մարգարյան; December 22, 1915 – January 28 or 29, 1999) was an Armenian poet, translator, member of the USSR Writers Union since 1937.

== Biography ==
Maro Markarian was born on December 22, 1915, in Shulaver (now Shaumiani village, Marneuli region of Georgia) to peasant parents. Markarian received her initial secondary education in her hometown through means of local schooling and was later fortunate to attend the Academy of Painting in 1933 found in Tiflis. Her first poem was published in 1935. Later in 1938 she graduated from the University of Yerevan from the department of literature. She then studied in the postgraduate course of the Armenian branch of the USSR Academy of Sciences. From 1967 to 1984 she also worked in the Committee for Cultural Relations with the Diaspora.

The main themes surrounding Markarian's poetry formulates around topics regarding love, human relations, and her homeland Armenia. Markarian's poems have been translated and published in several books in Russian.

She died on January 28 or 29, 1999, in Yerevan, Armenia and is currently buried in Byurakan.

== Family ==
- Brother: Benjamin Markarian, astronomer
- Husband: Sargis Bayandur, art critic, Honored Art Worker of the Republic of Armenia
- Daughter: Anahit Bayandur, Armenian translator, Member of the Supreme Council of the First convocation of the Republic of Armenia, human rights activist
- Son: Ashot Bayandur, painter

== Literature ==
- Felix Bakhchinyan, Kingdom of Nostalgia, Yerevan, 2003.
- Naira Hambardzumyan, Maro Markarian's lyric poetry, Yerevan, 2003.

== Achievements ==
- Order of Friendship of Peoples, 1985
- Laureate of the USSR State Prize (1983, for the collection of poems "Dedications")
- Laureate of the Avetik Isahakyan Prize, 1981 (for the collection of poems "Dedications")
