= Shulaveri =

Shulaveri may refer to

- Shaumiani, a town in the Kvemo Kartli region of Georgia
- Shulaveri-Shomu culture, a Late Neolithic/Eneolithic culture located in present-day Georgia, Azerbaijan and the Armenian Highlands
