= Rueb =

Rueb is a surname. Notable people with the surname include:

- Alexander Rueb (1882–1959), Dutch lawyer, diplomat, and chess official
- Andrew Rueb (born 1972), American tennis player and coach
- Gra Rueb (1885–1972), Dutch sculptor
