= Signe Hasso =

Swedish actress (1915–2002)

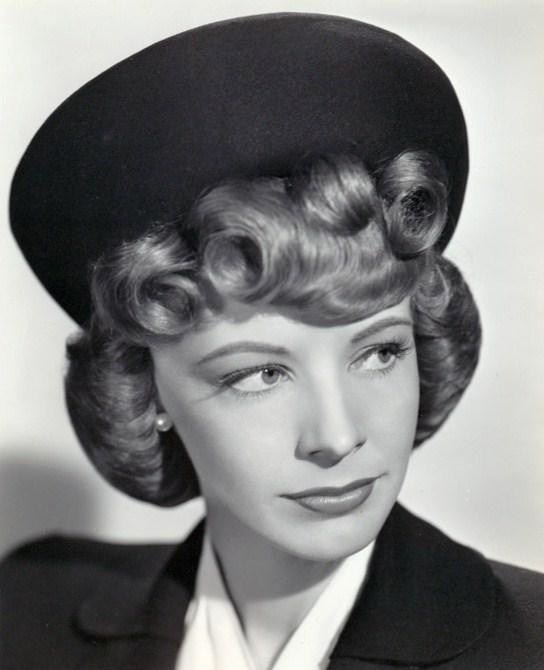
- Hasso in Strange Triangle (1946)
- Born: Signe Eleonora Cecilia Larsson; 15 August 1915; Stockholm, Sweden
- Died: 7 June 2002 (aged 86); Los Angeles, California, U.S.
- Occupation: Actress
- Years active: 1927–1998
- Spouses: Harry Hasso (m. 1933; div. 1942) William Langford (died 1955)
- Children: 1

Signe Eleonora Cecilia Hasso (née Larsson; 15 August 1915 – 7 June 2002) was a Swedish actress.

== Early life ==
Hasso was born in the Kungsholmen parish of Stockholm in 1915. Her father and grandfather died when she was four, and her mother, grandmother, two siblings, and her shared a single room. Her mother, a former aspiring actress herself, worked as a waffle cook. Hasso attended Matteusskolan, Kungsholms elementarskola för flickor (elementary school for girls) and Norrmalms enskilda läroverk.

== Career ==
Hasso's acting career began by accident. When a young actress fell ill, her mother was asked if she knew of any little girl who could act. Hasso later recalled, "I was 12 then and didn't want to go and neither did my sister, so my mother flipped a coin. I lost." Her audition for a Molière play was successful, and she started earning money as an actress. She performed in Royal Dramatic Theatre productions, beginning in 1927 at the age of 12, and enrolled as the youngest acting student in its history at the age of 16.

Hasso performed on stage and in film in Sweden. In 1933, she made her first film, Tystnadens hus, with German cinematographer/director Harry Hasso, whom she married the same year.

In Sweden, Signe was approached by Hollywood's Howard Hughes to move to the United States, where she signed a contract with RKO Pictures (which he would later control), and she was promoted as the next Greta Garbo. With only a few RKO roles forthcoming, she turned to the stage to make a living. According to the Internet Broadway Database, she appeared in five Broadway productions, beginning with Golden Wings (1941). In the mid-1940s, she signed with Metro-Goldwyn-Mayer. Her first role of note was in Heaven Can Wait (1943). During the 1940s, she appeared in The Seventh Cross (1944), Johnny Angel (1945), The House on 92nd Street (1945), A Scandal in Paris (1946), and Where There's Life (1947). Her favorite role was as the ex-wife of an actor driven mad, played by Ronald Colman, in A Double Life (1947).

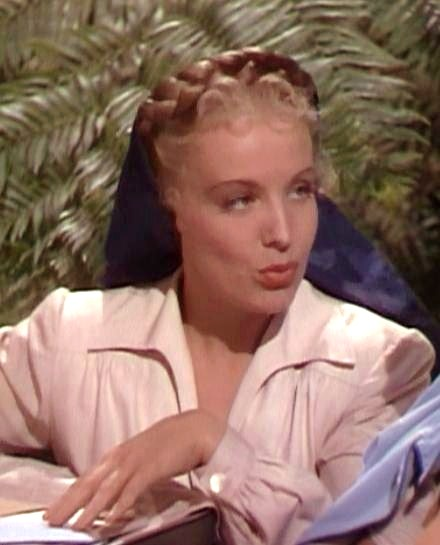
Hasso in The Story of Dr. Wassell (1944)

By the 1950s, Hasso's Hollywood career had stalled. From then on, she divided her time between making films in Sweden and acting on stage in New York City until she returned to Hollywood in the 1960s. She also acted on television, making guest appearances in several popular TV series, including Route 66, Bonanza, The Outer Limits, The Green Hornet, Hawkins, Cannon, Starsky and Hutch, The Streets of San Francisco, Ellery Queen, Quincy, M.E., Magnum, P.I., Trapper John, M.D., Hart to Hart, and The Fall Guy. She was also a frequent television guest on Bob Hope's NBC TV (Burbank) prime-time series.

Hasso worked as a composer, lyricist, songwriter and author. She also translated Swedish folk songs into English. Her debut novel, Momo (1977), depicts her childhood in interwar Stockholm. Her album Where the Sun Meets the Moon (1979) consists of her own versions of Swedish folk tunes. In a 1995 interview, she stated she wanted to be remembered for her writing, not her acting. She continued to act until late in her life, her last film being One Hell of a Guy (1998).

== Personal life and death ==
Her first husband was cinematographer/director Harry Hasso, whom she married in 1933. They had a son by the time she was 19, and divorced in 1942. In 1957, her son was killed in a car accident. In the seventies, she relocated to Park La Brea, Los Angeles where she remained until her death.

Hasso died of pneumonia and cancer at Cedars-Sinai Medical Center in Los Angeles in 2002, aged 86.

== Awards ==
In 1935, Hasso received the Theatre League's De Wahl-stipendium and in 1939 the first Nordic nordiska Gösta Ekmanpriset. In 1972, King Gustaf VI Adolf of Sweden named her Member 1st Class of the Royal Order of Vasa. In 1989, the Vasa Order of America named her Swedish-American of the Year. Hasso has a star on the Hollywood Walk of Fame for her contribution to motion pictures, at 7080 Hollywood Boulevard.

== Filmography ==
- Tystnadens hus (House of Silence, 1933) – Susanna Braun
- Witches' Night (1937) – Majken Celsing
- Career (1938) – Monika Hall
- Geld fällt vom Himmel (1938) – Hannelore
- Pengar från skyn (1938) – Hanne
- The Two of Us (1939) – Kristina – hans hustru
- Emilie Högquist (1939) – Emelie Högqvist
- Bastard (1940) – Aitanga, nomadepike
- Stål (1940) – Margit
- Än en gång Gösta Ekman (1940 short) – Birgit Steen
- With Open Arms (1940) – Eva Richert
- The Three of Us (1940) – Kristina, hans hustru
- Den ljusnande framtid (Bright Prospects, 1941) – Birgit Norén
- Assignment in Brittany (1943) – Elise
- Heaven Can Wait (1943) – Mademoiselle
- The Story of Dr. Wassell (1944) – Bettina
- The Seventh Cross (1944) – Toni
- Dangerous Partners (1945) – Carola Ballister
- The House on 92nd Street (1945) – Elsa Gebhardt
- Johnny Angel (1945) – Paulette Girard
- Strange Triangle (1946) – Francine Huber
- A Scandal in Paris (1946) – Therese De Pierremont
- Where There's Life (1947) – Gen. Katrina Grimovitch
- A Double Life (1947) – Brita Kaurin
- To the Ends of the Earth (1948) – Ann Grant
- Outside the Wall (1950) – Celia Bentner
- Crisis (1950) – Senora Isabel Farrago
- This Can't Happen Here (1950) – Vera Irmelin
- Hans Christian Andersen Fairy Tales (1952 short)
- The Sun of St. Moritz (1954) – Gerti Selle
- Taxi 13 (1954) – Agneta
- The Magnificent Lie (1955) – Joséphine de Merret
- Bonanza (1963), episode A Stranger Passed This Way - Christina Vandervort
- Picture Mommy Dead (1966) – Sister René
- Code Name: Heraclitus (1967 TV movie) – Lydia Constantine
- A Reflection of Fear (1972) – Julia
- Shell Game (1975 TV movie) – Countess
- The Black Bird (1975) – Dr. Crippen
- Sherlock Holmes in New York (1976 TV movie) – Fraulein Reichenbach
- I Never Promised You a Rose Garden (1977) – Helene
- Winner Take All (1977 TV movie)
- Evita Peron (1981 TV movie) – Fedora
- Pappa är död (1982 TV movie) – Sonja Bengtsson
- Mirrors (1985 TV movie) – Madame Eugenia
- One Hell of a Guy (1998) – Aunt Vivian

== Selected bibliography ==
- Momo (1977)
- Kom slott (1978)
- Inte än (1988)
- Om igen (1989)
- Tidens vän (1990)
