= The Woman of Sin =

1942 Italian film

- Directed by: Harry Hasso
- Written by: Ugo Betti; Tomaso Smith
- Produced by: Odon Berlioz
- Starring: Viveca Lindfors; Otello Toso; Gustav Diessl
- Cinematography: Renato Del Frate
- Edited by: Giancarlo Cappelli
- Music by: Gino Filippini
- Production company: Tirrenia Film
- Distributed by: Cine Tirrenia
- Release date: 29 December 1942
- Running time: 91 minutes
- Country: Italy
- Language: Italian

The Woman of Sin (Italian: La donna del peccato) is a 1942 Italian drama film directed by Harry Hasso and starring Viveca Lindfors, Otello Toso and Gustav Diessl. It was one of two films Swedish actress Lindfors made in wartime Italy. It was shot at the Cinecittà Studios in Rome. The film's sets were designed by the art director Guido Fiorini.

== Synopsis ==
A shady adventurer persuades his wife to steal an important invention from an engineer she has encountered on a train. However, they quickly fall in love with each other and he asks her to marry him. Tormented by her dilemma she attempts to commit suicide, but is rescued in time.

== Cast ==
- Viveca Lindfors as La giovane donna
- Otello Toso as Suo marito
- Gustav Diessl as L'ingegnere
- Alberto Capozzi
- Nino Marchesini
- Tatiana Farnese
- Giulio Panicali
- Vasco Creti
- Giuseppe Varni
- Leo Garavaglia
- Amelia Bissi
- Carlo Monteaux
- Ruggero Capodaglio
- Giovanni Petrucci
- Renato Navarrini
- Gioia Collei
- Carlo Ranieri
- Liana Del Balzo
- Armando Furlai
- Totò Mignone

== Bibliography ==
- Chiti, Roberto & Poppi, Roberto. I film: Tutti i film italiani dal 1930 al 1944. Gremese Editore, 2005.
- Qvist, Per Olov & von Bagh, Peter. Guide to the Cinema of Sweden and Finland. Greenwood Publishing Group, 2000
