= Arzu Abdullayeva =

Azerbaijani human rights activist

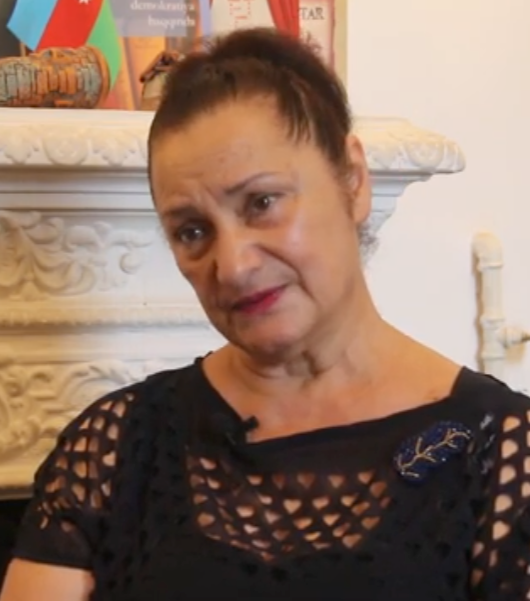
- In a 2020 interview
- Born: Baku, Azerbaijan SSR, USSR
- Citizenship: Azerbaijan
- Occupation: Human rights activist
- Years active: 1988–present
- Employer: Helsinki Citizens' Assembly
- Political party: Azerbaijani Social Democratic Party (before 2013)
- Awards: Olof Palme Prize (1992)

Arzu Ismail gizi Abdullayeva (Azerbaijani: Arzu Ismayil qızı Abdullayeva) is an Azerbaijani human rights activist. In 1988, following the outbreak of the First Nagorno-Karabakh War, she became an activist for peace and reconciliation between Azerbaijan and Armenia over Nagorno-Karabakh, for which she was jointly awarded the Olof Palme Prize with Armenian activist Anahit Bayandur.

== Personal life ==
Abdullayeva is from Baku. She later studied in Moscow.

== Activism ==
During the emergence of the Karabakh movement and the subsequent First Nagorno-Karabakh War, Abdullayeva and Armenian activist Anahit Bayandur advocated for a resolution to the conflict based on mutual respect and non-violence between Azerbaijanis and Armenians. Abdullayeva was the chairperson of the Azerbaijani committee of the Helsinki Citizens' Assembly, as well as the co-chairperson HCA International. Abdullayeva and Bayandur facilitated talks and prisoner exchanges, and promoted the care of hostages and prisoners of war on both sides of the conflict. Abdullayeva was able to appeal directly to the newly elected President of Azerbaijan, Heydar Aliyev, for the release of 38 Armenian prisoners; it is estimated that in total, Abdullayeva and Bayandur were able to secure the releases of 500 prisoners and hostages from both sides of the conflict. Abdullayeva and Bayandur published a book, Gender and Peace, that provided training on promoting peace in the South Caucasus. Abdullayeva and Bayandur's efforts to promote understanding between Azerbaijan and Armenia over Nagorno-Karabakh led to them being jointly awarded the Olof Palme Prize in 1992. Bayandur died in 2011; due to ongoing tension between Azerbaijan and Armenia, Abdullayeva was unable to attend Bayandur's funeral.

Abdullayeva was a founding member of the Azerbaijani Social Democratic Party. She went on to criticise the party's president, Araz Alizadeh, of allowing the party to become "inactive and unnecessary" under his leadership.

In 1998, Abdullayeva was awarded the European Union and United States Government's Award for Democracy and Civil Society.

In 2005, Abdullayeva founded the Public Council of Experts on the Solution of the Karabakh Conflict with the organisations Pax Christi and the Crisis Management Initiative, including peacekeepers, political scientists, internally displaced people and editors, though it does not have any Armenian members. Abdullayeva has called for education to counter prejudice and propaganda, including educating people about the construction of enemy images and their political mechanisms.

In 2015, Abdullayeva received the inaugural Helsinki Civil Society Award, alongside Andrey Yurov from Russia, for her contribution to the diplomatic settlement of the Nagorno-Karabakh conflict, and her human rights activism in Azerbaijan.

In 2016, during the Four Day War in Nagorno-Karabakh, Abdullayeva lamented deaths on both sides, as well as war propaganda, and published an appeal calling for the conflict to be ended immediately.

In 2017, Abdullayeva was among a group of activists called for the release of political prisoners in Azerbaijan, including Ilgar Mammadov.
