= Harry Hasso =

German-Swedish cinematographer (1904–1984)

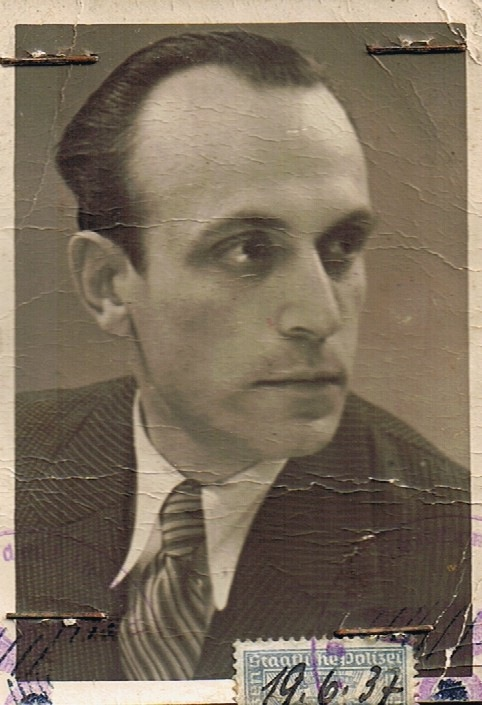
- Born: Karl Hartnagel; 24 July 1904; Frankenthal, Germany
- Died: 11 July 1984 (aged 79); Helsingborg, Sweden
- Occupations: Cinematographer, cameraman, director, actor
- Years active: 1920–1953
- Spouse(s): Zoe Walewskaja (m. 19??; div. 1933) Signe Hasso (m. 1933; div. 1941) Viveca Lindfors (m. 1941; div. 1943) Giesela Hartnagel (m. 1947; div. 1953) Britta Hasso (m. 1961)
- Children: 5

Harry Hasso (born Karl Hartnagel; 24 July 1904 – 11 July 1984) was a German-Swedish cinematographer and film director.

== Career ==
Hasso was born in Frankenthal, Germany. He worked in Sweden, Germany and Italy and for a short time in Finland as a cameraman and film director and he also wrote some of the music and manuscripts for some of the films he made. He learned to play the violin at a very young age and also played harmonica. He started his career in Luxembourg when was 16 years old. He started his own film company at age 18.

Hasso made many movies and at least 100 documentary films, among them films about his home country and home town. All the documentaries he made have been missing since World War II. Occasionally, he was an actor in some of his films.

He also worked in a circus as an acrobat and according to himself his act there was to stand on one hand on a bottle that was placed on a chair.

== Personal life ==
Hasso married Swedish actresses Signe Hasso in 1933 and Viveca Lindfors in 1941. Both were successful actresses in the United States. Signe Hasso has a star in the Hollywood Walk of Fame and was a famous Hollywood movie star. Harry Hasso remarried twice after that. His last wife was Swedish actress Britta Hasso. They married in 1961 and remained married until his death in 1984.

== Selected filmography ==
- False Greta (1934) [Cinematographer]
- Eva Goes Aboard (1934) [Cinematographer]
- House of Silence (1988) (1933) [Cinematographer] [Actor]
- Pengar från skyn (1938) [Cinematographer]
- In Paradise (1941) [Cinematographer]
- The Talk of the Town (1941) [Cinematographer]
- If I Could Marry the Minister (1941) [Cinematographer]
- The Yellow Clinic (1942) [Cinematographer]
- The Woman of Sin (1942) [Director]
- Border Post 58 (1951) [Director]
- Maria Johanna (1953) [Cinematographer] [Director] [Actor] [Writer]
