= Folke Rogard =

Swedish lawyer, chess player and official (1899–1973)

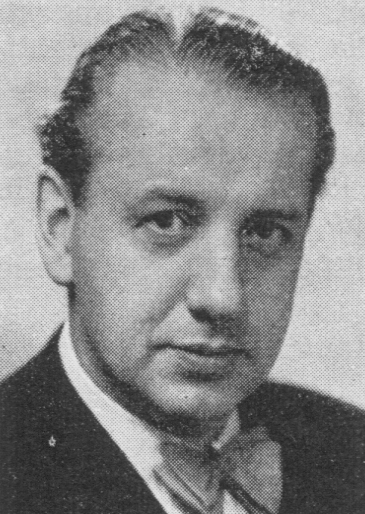

President of FIDE
- In office 1949–1970
- Preceded by: Alexander Rueb
- Succeeded by: Max Euwe

Personal details
- Born: Bror Axel Folke Per Rosengren; 6 July 1899 Stockholm, Sweden
- Died: 11 June 1973 (aged 73)

Bror Axel Folke Per Rogard (6 July 1899 – 11 June 1973) was a Swedish lawyer, chess official, player and arbiter.

He was born in Stockholm, with the surname Rosengren, and qualified as a lawyer with that name. After a family member was charged with burglary, he changed his name to Rogard and severed all connections with his family.

Rogard was vice-president of the World Chess Federation (FIDE), from 1947 to 1949, then succeeded Alexander Rueb as president, a post he held until succeeded by Max Euwe in 1970. He was also chairman of the Swedish Chess Federation from 1947 to 1964. Rogard was granted the International Arbiter title by FIDE in 1951. He could speak five languages.

During his senior leadership terms with FIDE, and with the Swedish federation, he was able to arrange for many high-profile chess events to be hosted in Sweden. Four Interzonal tournaments—Saltsjobaden 1948 (won by GM David Bronstein), Stockholm 1952 (won by GM Alexander Kotov), Gothenburg 1955 (won by GM Paul Keres), and Stockholm 1962 (won by GM and future World Champion Bobby Fischer) -- were all held in Sweden. The 1956 Student Chess Olympiad was held in Uppsala and won by the USSR. The 1969 World Junior Chess Championship was held in Stockholm and won by future World Champion Anatoly Karpov. The 1968 Candidates' match between Grandmasters Boris Spassky and Bent Larsen was held in Malmö, and won by Spassky. Gothenburg also hosted the FIDE Congress of 1955.

Major achievements for FIDE were many:

- Formalization of International Grandmaster and International Master titles, in 1950;
- Assuming control of the World Championship process, setting up Zones covering the chess world, together with Interzonal and Candidates tournaments on a regular three-year cycle, starting in 1948 with the World Championship Tournament to determine a new champion after holder Alexander Alekhine died in 1946;
- Re-establishing the Chess Olympiads, on a two-year cycle, starting in 1950, after an 11-year gap from the previous event in 1939;
- Establishment of the new World Junior Chess Championship, for players 20 years and younger, in 1951, on a two-year cycle, which was changed to an annual event in the early 1970s;
- Introduction of an International Rating System, in 1970.

Another enormous success toward the finish of Rogard's presidency was the first Russia (USSR) vs Rest of the World match, staged on ten boards in Belgrade, April 1970.

During Rogard's time of involvement with Swedish chess, Stockholm hosted the 1937 Chess Olympiad, won by the United States.

Rogard played chess at third category level.

He was married four times: first to Greta Santessen (1898-1999) from 1921 to 1934, they had a daughter Monica (born 1923); then to Gueye Rolf (1902-1973) until 1944; then to Viveca Lindfors (1920-1995) from 1944 to 1948, they had a daughter Lena Tabori (born 1944); last married to Ella Johansson (1920-2006) from 1965.
