= Where There's Life =

1947 film by Sidney Lanfield

- Theatrical poster
- Directed by: Sidney Lanfield
- Screenplay by: Allen Boretz; Melville Shavelson
- Story by: Melville Shavelson
- Produced by: Paul Jones
- Starring: Bob Hope; Signe Hasso; William Bendix; George Coulouris
- Cinematography: Charles Lang
- Edited by: Archie Marshek
- Music by: Charles Bradshaw (uncredited); Nathan Van Cleave (uncredited); Victor Young (uncredited)
- Distributed by: Paramount Pictures
- Release date: November 21, 1947
- Running time: 75 minutes
- Country: United States
- Language: English
- Box office: $3 million (US rentals)

Where There's Life is a 1947 American thriller comedy film directed by Sidney Lanfield. The film's title derives from a line in Don Quixote ("Where there's life, there's hope") as a play on the name of its star, Bob Hope. Also in the cast are Signe Hasso, William Bendix, and George Coulouris.

== Plot ==
Michael Valentine is an American radio announcer who finds out he is the new king of "Barovia", although a secret society called the Mordia, which believes it has assassinated Valentine's father, King Hubertus II, has other ideas.

== Cast ==
- Bob Hope as Michael Joseph Valentine
- Signe Hasso as General Katrina Grimovitch
- William Bendix as Victor O'Brien
- George Coulouris as Prime Minister Krivoc
- Vera Marshe as Hazel O'Brien
- George Zucco as Paul Stertorius
- Dennis Hoey as Minister of War Grubitch
- John Alexander as Herbert Jones
- Victor Varconi as Finance Minister Zavitch
- Joseph Vitale as Albert Miller
- Harry von Zell as Joe Snyder
- Anthony Caruso as John Fulda
- Norma Varden as Mabel Jones
- Harland Tucker as Mr. Alvin (Floorwalker)
- Roy Atwell as Salesman
- Emil Rameau as Dr. Josefsberg
- William Edmunds as King Hubertus II
- Crane Whitley as Assassin with Cane

== Reception ==
New York Times critic Bosley Crowther gave a moderately approving review, writing, "... its madcap humors will intoxicate the friends of Mr. Hope; those less susceptible to his high spirits are likely to be just depressed."
