= Viveca Lindfors =

Swedish actress (1920–1995)

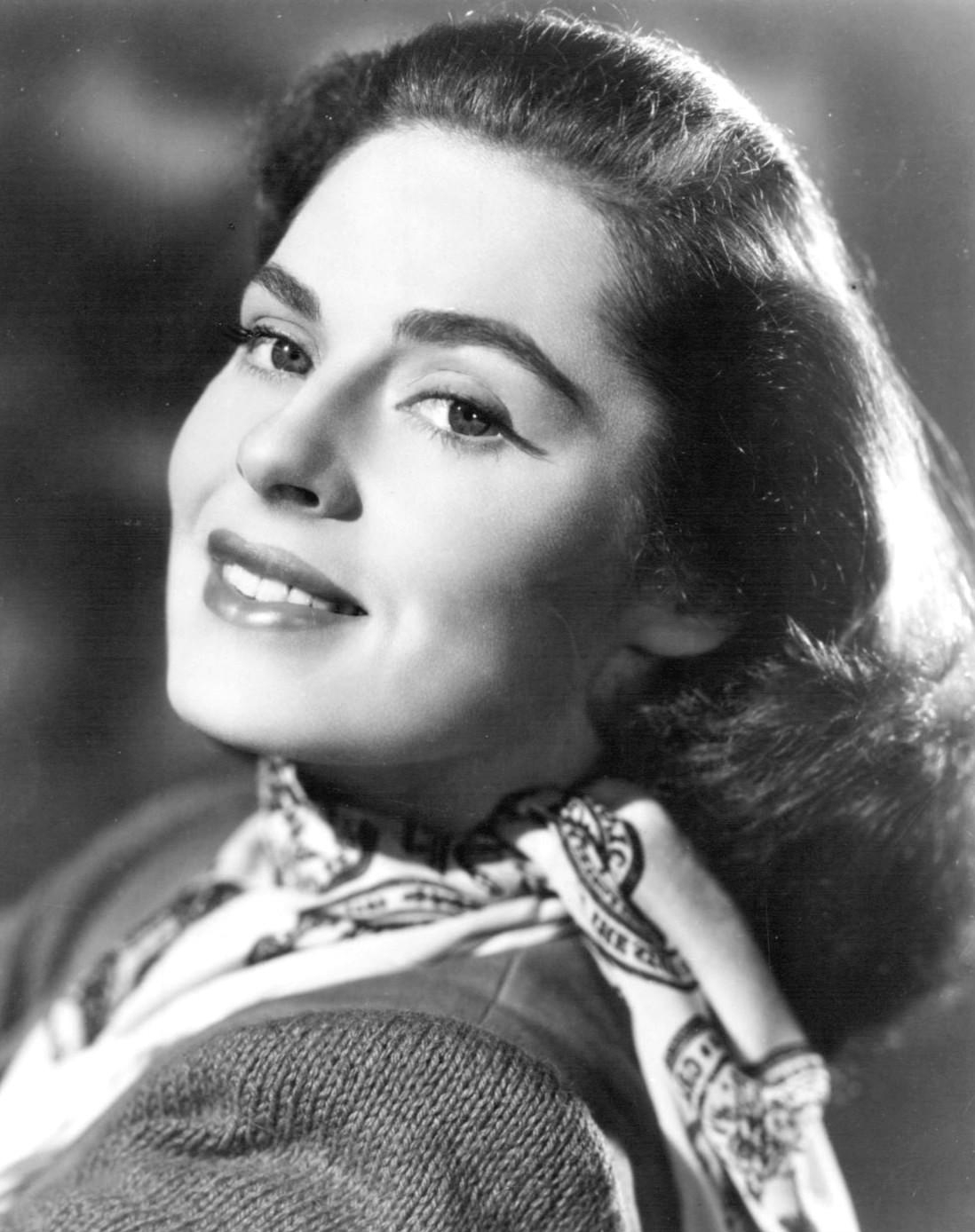
- Viveca Lindfors, 1957
- Born: Elsa Viveca Torstensdotter Lindfors; December 29, 1920; Uppsala, Sweden
- Died: October 25, 1995 (aged 74); Uppsala, Sweden
- Education: Royal Dramatic Training Academy
- Occupation: Actress
- Years active: 1940–1995
- Spouses: Harry Hasso (m. 1941; div. 1943) Folke Rogard (m. 1944; div. 1948) Don Siegel (m. 1948; div. 1953) George Tabori (m. 1954; div. 1972)
- Children: 3, including Kristoffer Tabori and Lena Tabori

Signature
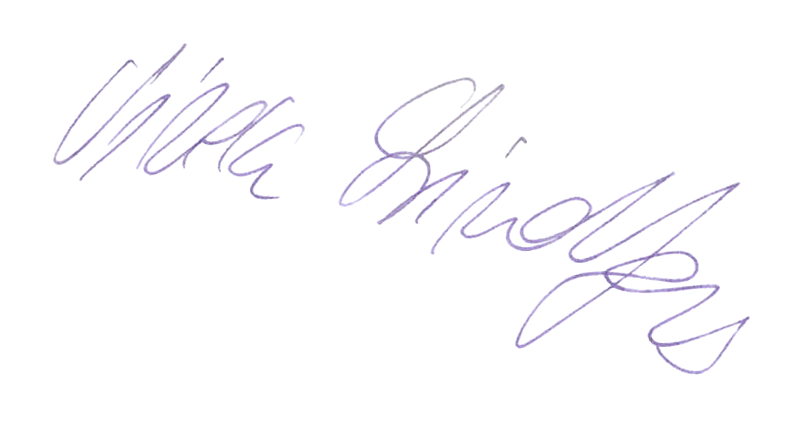

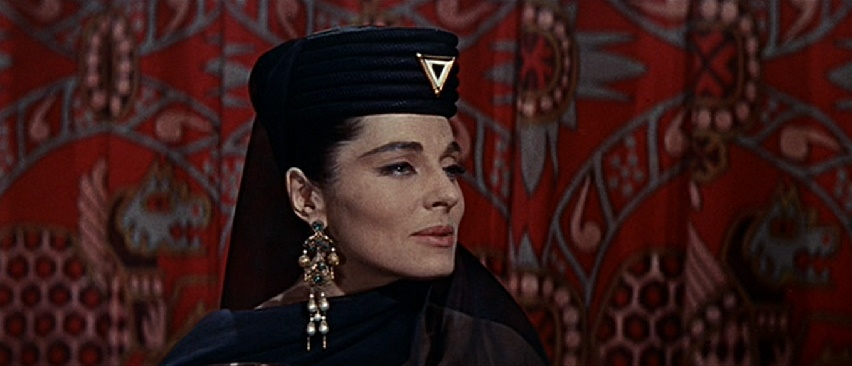
Lindfors as the Moabite high priestess in The Story of Ruth (1960)

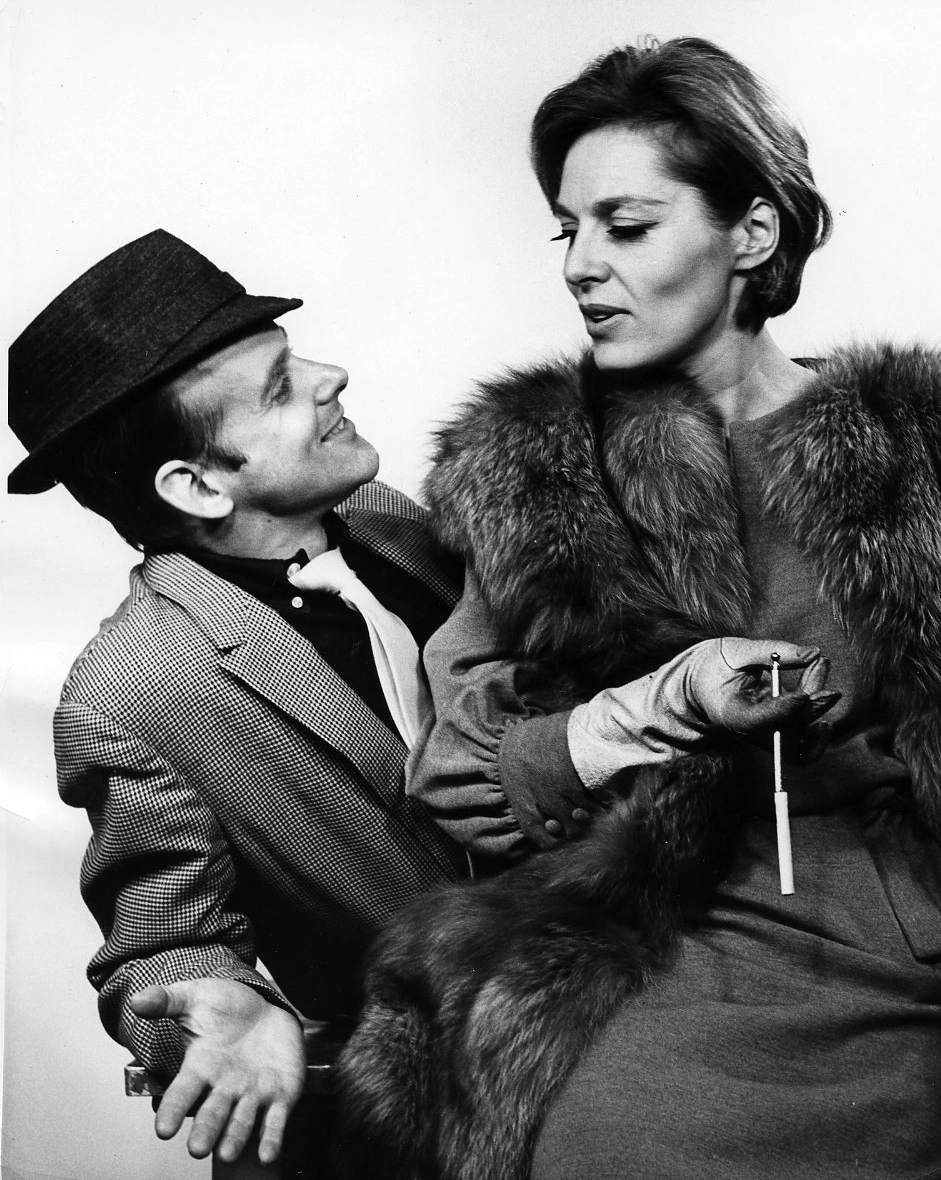
Lindfors with Bob Fosse in the Broadway revival of Pal Joey (1963)

Elsa Viveca Torstensdotter Lindfors (December 29, 1920 – October 25, 1995) was a Swedish-American stage, film, and television actress. She won an Emmy Award and a Silver Bear for Best Actress.

== Biography ==
Lindfors was born in Uppsala, Sweden, the daughter of Karin Emilia Therese (née Dymling) and Axel Torsten Lindfors.

She trained at the Royal Dramatic Training Academy, Stockholm. Soon after, she became a theater and film star in Sweden. She moved to the United States in 1946 after being signed by Warner Bros., and began working in Hollywood. She appeared in more than 100 films, including Night Unto Night, No Sad Songs for Me, Dark City, The Halliday Brand, King of Kings, An Affair of the Skin, Creepshow, The Sure Thing, and Stargate. She appeared with actors including Stewart Granger, Ronald Reagan, Jeffrey Hunter, Charlton Heston, Glenn Ford, Lizabeth Scott, and Errol Flynn.

In 1952, she appeared on Broadway alongside Edmond O'Brien in John Van Druten's I've Got Sixpence. Two years later, she made her West End debut in J. B. Priestley's poorly received play The White Countess.

Lindfors appeared frequently on television, usually as a guest star, though she played the title role in the miniseries Frankenstein's Aunt. Most of her TV appearances were in the 1950s and 1960s, with a resurgence in the 1980s and early 1990s. In 1990, she won an Emmy Award for her guest appearance on the series Life Goes On. She was nominated for an Emmy in 1978 for her supporting role in the TV movie A Question of Guilt.

In 1962, she shared the Silver Bear for Best Actress award with Rita Gam at the Berlin Film Festival, for their performances in Tad Danielewski's No Exit. Among her later film roles, she played the kindly and worldly wise Professor Taub in The Sure Thing (1985).

In the last years of her life, she taught acting at the School of Visual Arts in Manhattan, and had a lead role (essentially playing herself) in Henry Jaglom's Last Summer in the Hamptons (1995). The same year, she returned to the Strindberg Festival in Stockholm to perform in the play In Search of Strindberg.

== Personal life and death ==
Lindfors was married four times, to Swedish cinematographer Harry Hasso, Swedish attorney and World Chess Federation president Folke Rogard, director Don Siegel, and Hungarian writer, producer, and director George Tabori. She had three children – two sons (John Tabori with Hasso, and actor Kristoffer Tabori, with Siegel) and a daughter (Lena Tabori, with Rogard).

Lindfors was a naturalized U.S. citizen and a liberal Democrat, who supported the presidency of Jimmy Carter.

Lindfors died from complications of rheumatoid arthritis at the age of 74 in Uppsala.

== Selected filmography ==
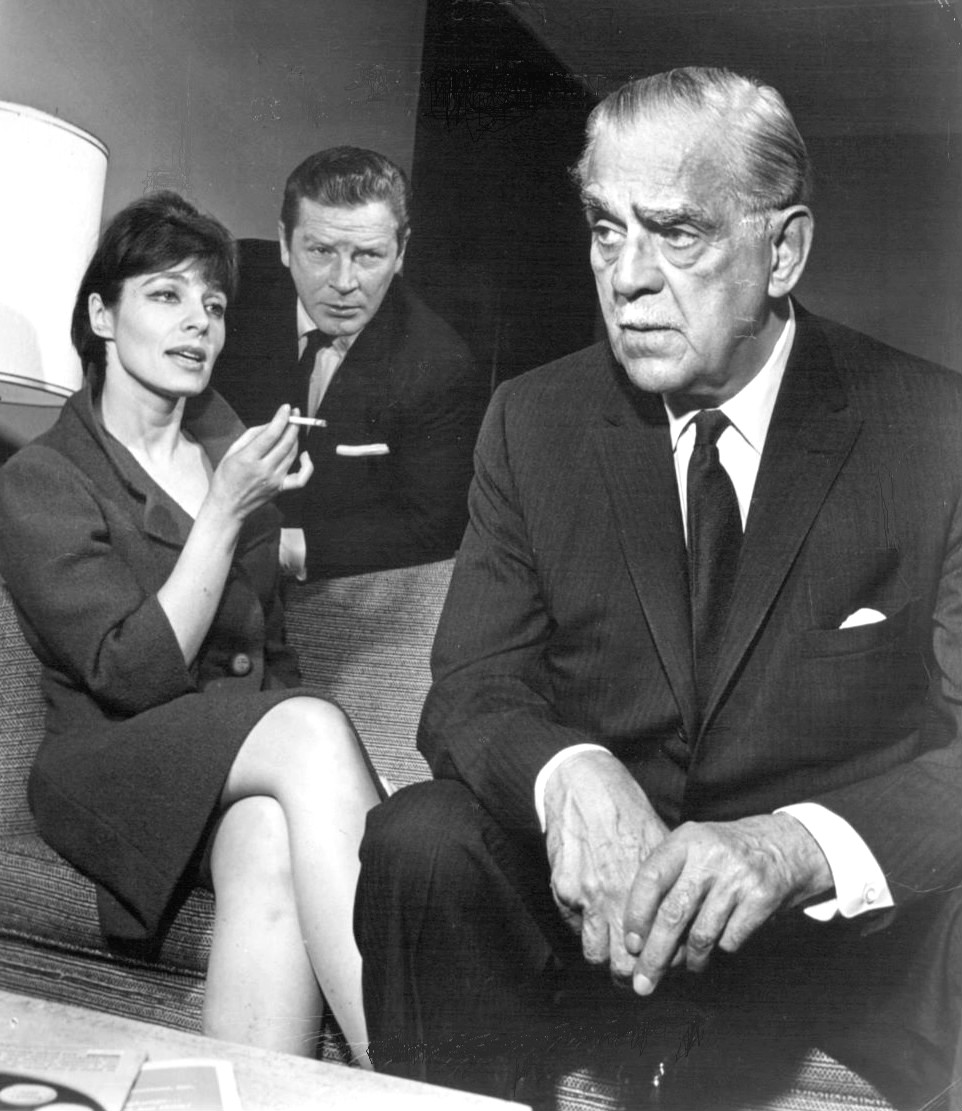
Lindfors, Richard Basehart and Boris Karloff in a Theatre '62 episode, "The Paradine Case" (1962)

Year	Title	Role	Notes
1940	The Crazy Family	Lisa	
1941	If I Could Marry the Minister	Eva Örn	
1941	In Paradise	Angelica Jansson	
1942	Tomorrow's Melody	Maj-Lis Wassberg	
1942	The Woman of Sin	The Young Woman	
1942	The Yellow Clinic	Nurse Doris	
1943	The Brothers' Woman	Emma	
1943	The Sin of Anna Lans	Anna Lans	
1944	Appassionata	Maria	
1944	Mist on the Sea	Maria Rosati	
1944	I Am Fire and Air	Jenny Ahrman	
1945	Black Roses	Märta Lind	
1945	The Serious Game	Lydia Stille	
1945	Maria of Kvarngarden	Maria	
1946	Interlude	Vellamo Toivonen	
1948	To the Victor	Christine Lund Lestrac	
1948	Adventures of Don Juan	Queen Margaret	
1949	Singoalla	Singoalla	
1949	Night Unto Night	Ann Gracie	
1950	Dark City	Victoria Winant	
1950	Backfire	Lysa Radoff	
1950	This Side of The Law	Evelyn Taylor	
1950	No Sad Songs for Me	Chris Radna	
1950	The Flying Missile	Karin Hansen	
1951	Four in a Jeep	Franziska Idinger	
1951	Journey Into Light	Christine Thorssen	
1952	Riders of Vengeance	Elena de Ortega	aka The Raiders
1955	Moonfleet	Mrs. Minton	
1955	Run for Cover	Helga Swenson	
1957	The Halliday Brand	Aleta Burris	
1958	I Accuse!	Lucie Dreyfus	
1958	Tempest	Caterine II	
1959	Rawhide	Luisa Esquivel Y Hadley	1 episode
1960	Johnny Midnight	Simone in episode "X Equals Murder")	
1960	The Story of Ruth	Eleilat	
1960	Weddings and Babies	Bea	
1961	King of Kings	Claudia Procula Pontius Pilate's wife	
1961	Tempest	Catherine the Great	
1961	The Untouchables	Mrs. Jarreau	
1961	Naked City	Lulu Kronen	1 episode
1962	No Exit	Inez	aka Sinners Go to Hell
1962–1964	The Defenders	Mady Lorne / Madeline Flanders	2 episodes
1963	The Damned	Freya Neilson	aka These Are the Damned
1964	Voyage to the Bottom of the Sea	Dr. Laura Rettig	1 episode
1964	12 O'Clock High	Nicole Trouchard	1 episode
1965	Brainstorm	Dr. Larstadt	
1965	Bonanza	Angela Bergstrom	Episode: "The Spotlight"
1965–1966	Ben Casey	Mrs. Boone / Vivian Bennett	2 episodes
1967	The Diary of Anne Frank	Petronella van Daan	TV movie
1967	Coronet Blue (TV series)	Magician's Wife	
1967–1969	The F.B.I.	Ida Salzman / Eva Bolen	2 episodes
1969	Coming Apart	Monica	
1970	Cauldron of Blood	Tania	
1970	The Interns	Jennie	1 episode
1972	A House Without Boundaries	Señorita Elvira	
1973	The Bell from Hell	Marta	
1973	The Way We Were	Paula Reisner	
1976	Welcome to L.A.	Susan Moore	
1978	A Question of Guilt	Dr. Rosen	TV movie. Emmy Award nomination for Outstanding; Performance by a Supporting Actress in a Drama or Comedy Special
1978	Girlfriends	Beatrice	
1978	A Wedding	Ingrid Hellstrom	
1979	Voices	Mrs. Lemon	
1981	The Hand	Doctress	
1982	Inside the Third Reich	Gypsy woman	TV movie
1982	Creepshow	Aunt Bedelia	Segment: "Father's Day"
1982	Divorce Wars: A Love Story	Barbara Harper	TV movie
1982	Dynasty	Adriana	1 episode
1983	Dies rigorose Leben	Ada	
1984	Trapper John, M.D.	Zella Korevechi	1 episode
1984	Passions	Lila	TV movie
1984	Silent Madness	Mrs. Collins	
1985	The Sure Thing	Professor Taub	
1987	Frankenstein's Aunt	Hannah von Frankenstein	7 episodes
1987	Rachel River	Harriet White	
1989	Misplaced	Zofia	
1989	Flickan vid stenbänken	Storråda	TV series
1990	Life Goes On	Mrs. Doubcha	1 episode. Emmy Award for Outstanding Guest; Actress in a Drama Series
1990	The Exorcist III	Nurse X	
1990	China Beach	Ilsa	1 episode
1991	Zandalee	Tatta	
1991	Child of Darkness, Child of Light	Ida Walsh	
1991	The Linguini Incident	Miracle	
1992	North of Pittsburgh	Rosa Andretti	Genie Award nomination for Best Actress
1993	Law & Order	Helga Holtz	1 episode
1994	Stargate	Catherine Langford	
1995	Last Summer in the Hamptons	Helena Mora	

== Major stage appearances ==
Year	Title	Role	Theatre
1952	I've Got Sixpence	Inez Cabral	Ethel Barrymore Theatre
1954–55	Anastasia	Anna	Lyceum Theatre
1956	Miss Julie	Miss Julie	Phoenix Theatre
1956	The Stronger	Miss Y	Phoenix Theatre
1956	King Lear	Cordelia	New York City Center
1959	I Rise in Flames, Cried the Phoenix	Frieda	Lucille Lortel Theatre
1962	Brecht on Brecht	n/a	Lucille Lortel Theatre
1963	Pal Joey	Vera Simpson	New York City Center
1965	Postmark Zero	n/a	Brooks Atkinson Theatre
1967	The Niggerlovers	The God, Angela	Lucille Lortel Theatre
1971	Dance of Death	Alice	Ritz Theatre
