= Britta Hasso =

Swedish actress and journalist (1936–2015)

Britta Hasso (1936 – 14 February 2015; also known as Britta Callmér-Hartnagel) was a Swedish actress and journalist. She was mostly known for writing articles about school and pedagogic topics.

Hasso studied to become an actress at Kalle Flygare's theatre school in Stockholm in the 1950s. Shortly after starting her career, she met Harry Hasso (also known as Karl Hartnagel), a Swedish/German cinematographer, whom she married in 1961. They remained married until his death in 1984.

She started to work as a journalist at Helsingborgs Dagblad in Helsingborg in 1966 and worked there until she retired in 1998. She died at age 79 on Valentine's Day 2015.
