= Olof Palme Prize =

Annual Swedish award

- Country: Sweden
- Status: Active
- Established: February 1987
- Website: https://www.palmefonden.se

The Olof Palme Prize is an annual Swedish prize awarded for an outstanding achievement in the spirit of Olof Palme. The Prize consists of a diploma and 100,000 US dollars.

The prize was established in February 1987 and is awarded by the Olof Palme Memorial Fund for International Understanding and Common Security (Swedish: Olof Palmes minnesfond för internationell förståelse och gemensam säkerhet), a fund that was established by Olof Palme's family and the Swedish Social Democratic Party in honor of Olof Palme's memory.

== Recipients ==
Sources:

- 1987 Cyril Ramaphosa
- 1988 UN Peacekeeping Operation under the leadership of Javier Pérez de Cuéllar
- 1989 Václav Havel
- 1990 Harlem Désir and SOS Racisme
- 1991 Amnesty International
- 1992 Arzu Abdullayeva and Anahit Bayandur
- 1993 Students for Sarajevo
- 1994 Wei Jingsheng
- 1995 Fatah Youth, Labour Young Leadership and Peace Now
- 1996 Casa Alianza under the leadership of Bruce Harris
- 1997 Salima Ghezali
- 1998 Independent media in the former Yugoslavia represented by Veran Matić of B92 radio (Serbia), Senad Pećanin of Dani weekly (Bosnia-Herzegovina) and Viktor Ivančić of Feral Tribune weekly (Croatia).
- 1999 Swedish anti-racists: Kurdo Baksi, Björn Fries and the Parent Group in Klippan, representing the popular mobilization against growing racism and xenophobia in the country.
- 2000 Bryan Stevenson
- 2001 Fazle Hasan Abed and girls' education
- 2002 Hanan Ashrawi
- 2003 Hans Blix
- 2004 Lyudmila Alexeyeva, Sergey Kovalyov, Anna Politkovskaya
- 2005 Aung San Suu Kyi
- 2006 Kofi Annan, Mossaad Mohamed Ali
- 2007 Parvin Ardalan
- 2008 Denis Mukwege
- 2009 Carsten Jensen
- 2010 Eyad al-Sarraj
- 2011 Lydia Cacho, Roberto Saviano
- 2012 Radhia Nasraoui, Waleed Sami Abu AlKhair
- 2013 Rosa Taikon
- 2014 Xu Youyu
- 2015 Gideon Levy, Mitri Raheb
- 2016 Spyridon Galinos, Giusi Nicolini
- 2017 Hédi Fried, Emerich Roth
- 2018 Daniel Ellsberg
- 2019 John le Carré
- 2020 Black Lives Matter Global Network Foundation
- 2022 Patricia Gualinga
- 2023 Marta Chumalo, Eren Keskin, Narges Mohammadi
- 2024 Bellingcat
- 2025 Utøya
- 2026 Navi Pillay and John Dugard

== See also ==
- List of peace activists
