= Rosa Taikon =

Swedish-Romani silversmith and actress

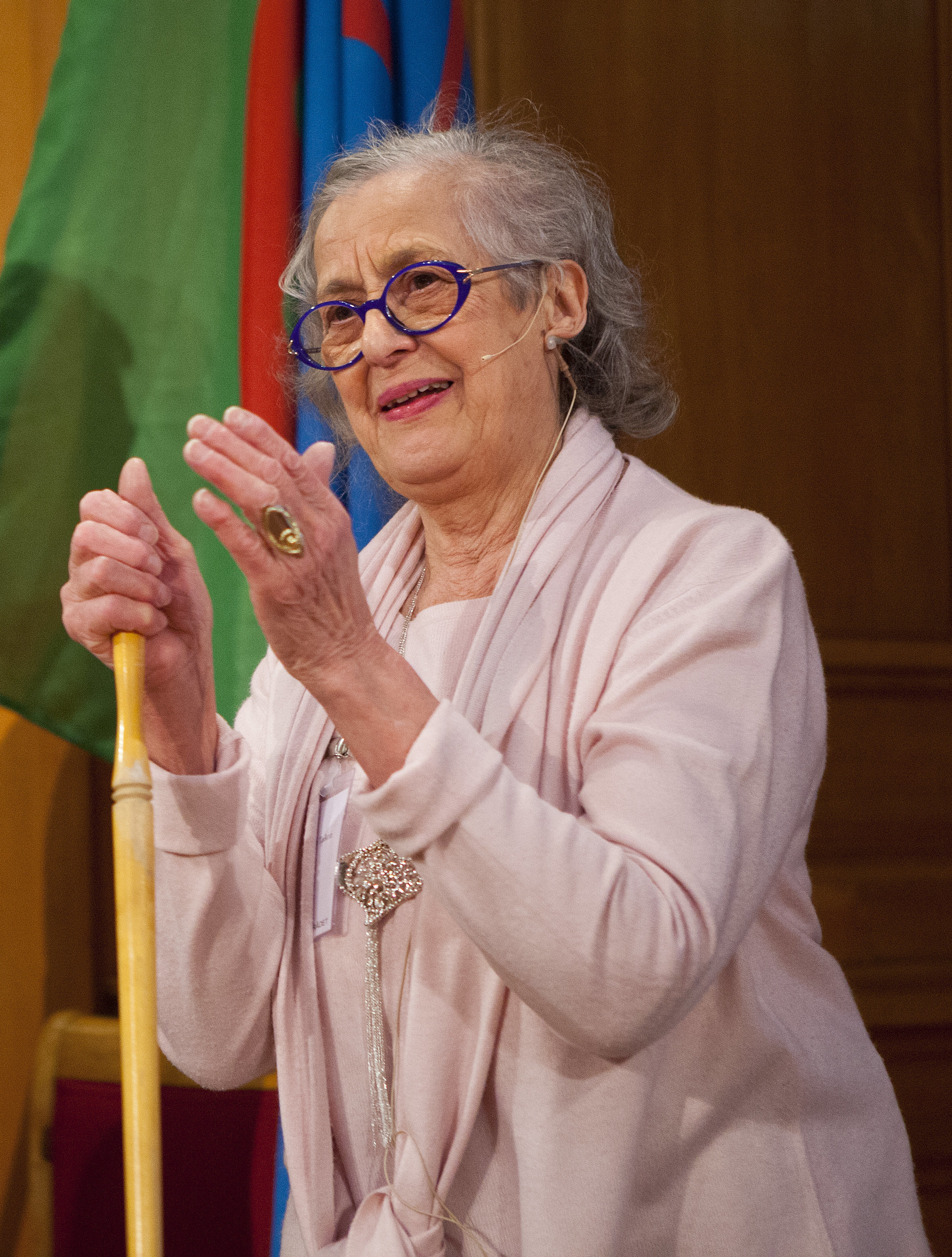
- Taikon at the Roma Jubilee Conference, March 2012
- Born: 30 July 1926; Tibro, Västergötland, Sweden
- Died: 1 June 2017 (aged 90); Ytterhogdal, Hälsingland, Sweden
- Resting place: Skogskyrkogården, Stockholm, Sweden
- Education: Konstfack
- Style: Silversmith
- Spouses: Allan Widegren (m. 1948; div. 1952) Bernd Janusch (m. 1967; div. 1987)
- Awards: Illis Quorum (2010); Olof Palme Prize (2013)

Rosa Sofia Ingeborg Taikon (30 July 1926 – 1 June 2017), formerly Janusch and Widegren, was a Swedish Romani silversmith and activist. From the Kalderash subgroup, Taikon first received public recognition for her work as a silversmith. Following the murder of her brother in 1962, Taikon and her sister Katarina became noted Romani activists against antiziganism in Sweden as well as abroad. For her contribution to Romani rights, Taikon was awarded the Olof Palme Prize in 2013.

== Biography ==
Taikon was the daughter of Johan Istvan Taikon and Agda Karlsson, and the older sister of the writer Katarina Taikon. Her mother was from Härryda, while her father, a fairground owner, merchant, coppersmith, and musician, first visited Sweden in 1898, and opted to stay there in 1914 after the Swedish government introduced a ban on admitting Romani people into the country. Taikon married Masha, a Russian immigrant, after settling in Sweden; they had no children. During the 1920s, Taikon met Karlsson while she was waitressing at a restaurant in Gothenburg. Karlsson moved in with Taikon and Masha, and had four children together: in addition to Rosa and Katarina, they also had a son, Paul, and another daughter, Paulina. The children grew up understanding Masha to be their grandmother or great-grandmother.

In 1932, Karlsson died of tuberculosis shortly after Katarina's birth, when Taikon was six years old. Soon afterwards, her father remarried a woman from Sundsvall. The family frequently had to travel around Sweden in search of work, which was difficult to find due to anti-Romani discrimination. Taikon later reported that the family had to move every three weeks due to anti-loitering laws; historian Jan Selling subsequently said that such laws did not exist, but that it was likely that local law enforcement implemented informal "three-week rules".

Due to many schools refusing to accept Romani students, Taikon's father opted to train his children to work instead. At the age of 10, Taikon began working as a drummer in her father's orchestra. However, between 1957 and 1959, Taikon attended Birkagårdens Folkhögskola, an adult education school, and subsequently attended Konstfack, a university college in Stockholm, between 1961 and 1966. After her graduation in 1947 at the age of 41, she began training as a silversmith, the traditional trade of the men in her family. In 1969, her work as a silversmith was recognised in an exhibition held at Nationalmuseum in Stockholm.

In 1962, Taikon's brother Paul was murdered, which led to her becoming a prominent Romani activist in Sweden. Alongside her sister Katarina, they published the book Zigenerska in 1963.

In 1984, Taikon was one of the host of that year's Sommar celebration. That same year, she was a guest on an episode of Här är ditt liv, the Swedish version of This Is Your Life. During the summer of 1994, a major exhibition of Taikon's work, alongside that of Herta Bengtson, Karin Björquist and Ingegerd Råman was held at the Träslosset in Arbrå.

In recognition for her work as both a silversmith and a Romani activist, Taikon was awarded the Illis quorum in 2010 and the Olof Palme Prize in 2013.

Between 1948 and 1952, Taikon was married to Allan Widegren (1927–1971), a sailor. From 1967 until 1987, she was married to fellow silversmith Bernd Janusch (born 1943). She was the aunt of the musical artist Jim Jidhed.

Taikon spent much of her life living in Ytterhogdal. In 2017 she died at the age of 90. She is buried in the Skogskyrkogården in Stockholm. Her workshop was subsequently donated to the Hälsinglands Museum, and in 2021 it became part of the museum's permanent exhibition. Some of her works are also displayed at the Nationalmuseum and the Röhsska Museum in Gothenburg.

== Filmography ==
- 1953 – Marianne
- 1950 –The Motor Cavaliers
- 1950 – Kyssen på kryssen
- 1949 – Smeder på luffen
