= Katarina Taikon =

Swedish Romani writer-actor

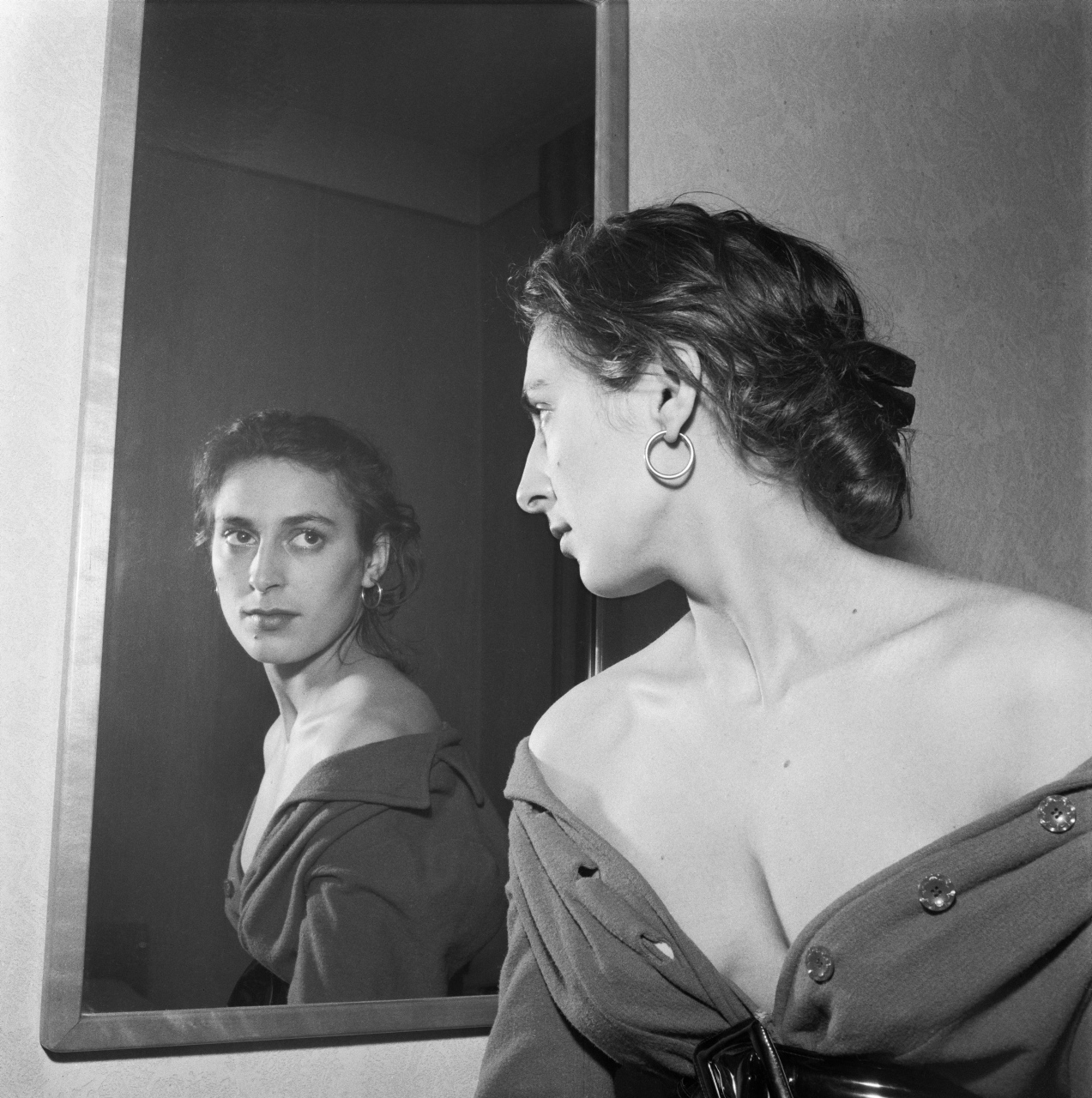
- Taikon in 1953
- Born: 29 July 1932; Almby, Örebro, Sweden
- Died: 30 December 1995 (aged 63); Ytterhogdal, Hälsingland, Sweden
- Other name: Kahtitsi Taikon
- Occupations: Activist, writer and actor
- Spouses: ? (m. 1946; div. 1948) Björn Langhammer (m. 1962; div. 1981)
- Children: 2
- Relatives: Rosa Taikon (sister)

Katarina Taikon-Langhammer (29 July 1932 – 30 December 1995) was a Swedish Romani activist, leader in the civil rights movement, writer and actor, from the Kalderash sub group. She was the sister of Rosa Taikon. She has been called the Martin Luther King of Sweden.

== Family background ==
Taikon's grandparents, Cori Caldares and his wife, came to Sweden with their twelve children at the turn of the century. They adopted the surname Taikon as it was already common in Romani communities, allowing them to avoid revealing they had recently immigrated.

One of the twelve children was Johan Taikon, Katarina Taikon's father, who working in both copper and silversmithing.

== Early life ==
In 1932 Katarina Taikon was born in a camp near Örebro to Johan Dimitri Taikon (1879–1950) and a Swedish woman, his second wife, who died when Katarina was only one year of age. She had three older siblings: Paul, Rosa, and Paulina.

During Taikon's childhood Romani still lived in camps in Sweden, and had to move often, which made it hard for the children to get any school education. Taikon did not learn how to write until she was 26. This was despite the efforts of her father, who had been advocating for the education of Romani children since the 1930s. He tried to enroll his children in schools but was often rejected by the authorities or by local families, who threatened to remove their own children from school if they had Romani classmates.

In 1946, Taikon was married off to a man eight years her senior. After a few months, she ran away from the tent she shared with her family and husband to another Romani camp. She was returned to her camp, but soon ran away again. She found a job in a shop through a charitable organization and lived on her own for several years.

== Acting career ==
In 1948, a 16-year-old Taikon participated in Arne Sucksdorff's documentary short film Uppbrott, where she danced around a campfire as part of a performance imitating traditional Romani dance. The filming of the documentary made it possible for Taikon to divorce her husband. For the next decade, Taikon acted in several Swedish motion pictures.

== Activism ==
Taikon dedicated her life to improving conditions for Romani people in Sweden and throughout the world. Through her tireless work, debating, writing and talking to Swedish authorities, the Romani were granted the same right to housing and education as all other Swedes. In 1953, the 1914 ban on Romani immigration ended. This led to other Romani seeking refuge in Sweden, and the population, at first less than a thousand people, grew.

In 1964 Katarina and her sister Rosa helped found the Zigenarsamfundet (Roma Society). That same year, Taikon was appointed as an honorary member of the Swedish Youth Peace Alliance. In 1965 Taikon headed the Romani May Day demonstration in Stockholm, the first such public Romani demonstration in the country. The demonstration called for the right to education.

Taikon tried to convince Swedish authorities that these people were in fact political refugees, since they had been oppressed in their countries. In 1967 she successfully worked to convince the Swedish government to allow Italian and Polish Romani refugees to remain in Sweden. After fruitless efforts to help a group of 47 French Romani gain asylum in Sweden, she decided to change her strategy. The only way to end the prejudices against her people was to address the young, she realized, so she started to write her popular series of children's books about her own childhood, called Katitzi. Between 1969 and 1980 she published 13 books in the series. A comic book adaptation was created in 1975, and in 1979 a television series based on the books was produced. Her sister Rosa later wrote:

the terrible injustices of which the Gypsies have for centuries been the victims, with the result that my generation and those which preceded it were deprived of all civil rights, might have continued in our country if, around 1960, Katarina Taikon had not decided to combat prejudice and racism in all its forms, She wrote books and countless newspaper articles, approached prime ministers, the Government, Parliament and all the political parties.

== Writing career ==
In 1963 Taikon published Zigenerska, an autobiographical book that focused on the struggles of the Romani community in Sweden.

In 1969 Taikon released her first children's book, Katitzi, based on her own childhood. By 1980 she had published thirteen books in the series. Unlike some earlier Swedish children's books, the Katitzi series deals with darker storylines as the books progress, with the last few being aimed toward a teenage demographic. The books aimed to illustrate the struggles Romani children and communities faced as a result of systemic societal and legal discrimination.

A comic book adaptation of Katitizi was created in 1975, and in 1979 a television series based on the books was produced.

== Personal life ==
Taikon married Björn Langhammer in 1962. She had two children.

== Death and legacy ==
Katarina Taikon died of brain damage in 1995 after a 13-year-long coma, which had been caused by cardiac arrest in 1982.

In 2012 Lawen Mohtadi wrote a biography of Taikon, entitled The Day I Will Be Free. In 2015 a documentary adaptation of Mohtadi's biography, entitled Taikon, was released.

== Filmography ==
- 1948 - Uppbrott
- 1949 - Singoalla
- 1950 - The Motor Cavaliers
- 1951 - Tull-Bom
- 1953 - Marianne
- 1953 - Åsa-Nisse på semester
- 1956 - Sceningång

== Publications ==
- Zigenerska (1963)
- Ziegnare är vi (1967)
- Katitzi I ormgropen (1971)
- Katitzi rymmer (1971)
- Katitzi, Rosa och Paul (1972)
- Katitzi I Stockholm (1973)
- Katitzi och Lump-Nicke (1974)
- Katitzi I skolan (1975)
- Katitzi Z-1234 (1976)
- Katitzi barnbruden (1977)
- Katitzi på flykt (1978)
- Katitzi i Gamla stan (1979)
- Uppbrottet (1980)
