= I've Got Sixpence =

1952 play by John Van Druten

- Original language: English
- Written by: John Van Druten
- Genre: Drama

Premiere
- Date: November 1952
- Place: Walnut Street Theatre, Philadelphia

I've Got Sixpence is a 1952 play by the British writer John Van Druten. The plot follows two girls who are roommates and their contrasting relationships with men.

After tryout runs in November, 1952 at both the Shubert Theatre (New Haven) and Philadelphia's Walnut Street Theatre, it ran on Broadway at the Barrymore Theatre for 23 performances from 2 December to 20 December 1952. The cast included Viveca Lindfors, Edmond O'Brien and Patricia Collinge.

It was not well-received by critics, who felt that O'Brien was miscast. He returned to Los Angeles and resumed his film acting career.

== Bibliography ==
- Gerald Bordman. American Theatre: A Chronicle of Comedy and Drama, 1930-1969. Oxford University Press, 1996.
- Derek Sculthorpe. Edmond O'Brien: Everyman of Film Noir. McFarland, 2018.
