= Lena Tabori =

American publisher and entrepreneur

- Born: Stockholm, Sweden
- Education: Sarah Lawrence College
- Occupation: Publisher
- Years active: 42
- Employer: Welcome Enterprises
- Parent(s): Viveca Lindfors and Folke Rogard, Stepfather: George Tabori
- Website: http://welcomeenterprisesinc.com/

Lena Tabori is the founder of Welcome Enterprises, Inc., co-founder of Stewart, Tabori & Chang (STC), and co-founder (with Mike Shatzkin) of www.climatechangeresources.org, a website to combat climate change. She began her publishing career in 1967 at Harry N. Abrams, remains a partner (with Clark Wakabayashi) at Welcome Enterprises Inc, after selling the Welcome Books imprint (under which Welcome Enterprises published visual books) to Rizzoli in 2014. Welcome Enterprises continues to package books for other publishers, including Disney. Her activity is primarily focused on the website, however. On January 15, 2020, she was named Chair of East Hampton Town’s Energy Sustainability and Resiliency Committee. She also sits on the Executive Board of The Association of Foreign Correspondents. A native of Sweden, Tabori lives in East Hampton, New York and New York City.

== Career ==
Lena Tabori began her career at Harry N. Abrams, Inc. and rose to the position of Vice President of Marketing and Special Sales before leaving in 1980 to co-found Welcome Enterprises (with Tom Wilson) and co-found Stewart, Tabori & Chang. Leaving Stewart, Tabori & Chang in 1982, Tabori packaged books through Welcome includingThe Art of Walt Disney (Hyperion), Judith Levy's best-selling Grandmother Remembers; the award-winning Glorious American Food (Random House) by Christopher Idone; and Love: A Celebration in Art and Literature (STC), which she co-edited with Jane Lahr.

In 1983 Tabori received an Emmy for her work as a producer and executive producer on Ziggy’s Gift. Directed by Richard Williams the show was an animated special for ABC television based on the Tom Wilson cartoon character, Ziggy.

In 1987 Lena began packaging books for Turner Broadcasting, editing such books as Kisses and MGM: When the Lion Roars by Peter Háy. In 1991 Tabori became president and publisher of Collins Publishers San Francisco for whom she created fifty new titles, including A Day in the Life of Hollywood.

In 1993 Tabori returned to Stewart, Tabori & Chang after a ten-year absence and became their president and publisher. During her time with STC she published more than 175 new titles before returning to Welcome Enterprises, Inc. full-time in 1997.

For Welcome, Tabori immediately created, edited and produced the first two titles in the Little Big Book series: The Little Big Book of Christmas and The Little Big Book of Love, which were both published by William Morrow. Subsequently, as she and her partner, Clark Wakabayashi, developed the Welcome Books imprint, she has been the co-editor of all additional Little Big Books including Moms and Dads, all published by Welcome Books. There are 27 in total.

Two award-winning books published by Welcome include, The Oxford Project by Stephen G. Bloom, photographed by Peter Feldstein and American Farmer, The Heart of Our Country with photographs by Paul Mobley and text by Katrina Fried. The Oxford Project received a 2009 Alex Award from the American Library Association and American Farmer, The Heart of Our Country received a Wrangler Award from The National Cowboy & Western Heritage Museum.

== Personal life ==
Lena Tabori is the daughter of Viveca Lindfors and Folke Rogard and the stepdaughter of George Tabori. Married to Marty Fried (since deceased), with whom she had two daughters: Natasha (born in 1970) and Katrina (born in 1973), she has been married to Frank Rehor since 2006.
