= Johnny Angel =

1945 film by Edwin L. Marin

- theatrical release poster
- Directed by: Edwin L. Marin
- Screenplay by: Steve Fisher; Frank Gruber (adaptation)
- Based on: Mr. Angel Comes Aboard; 1944 story by Charles Gordon Booth
- Produced by: William L. Pereira executive Jack J. Gross
- Starring: George Raft; Claire Trevor; Signe Hasso
- Cinematography: Harry J. Wild
- Edited by: Les Millbrook
- Music by: Leigh Harline
- Production company: RKO Radio Pictures
- Distributed by: RKO Radio Pictures
- Release dates: October 25, 1945 (LA); December 20, 1945 (Sweden)
- Running time: 79 minutes
- Country: United States
- Language: English

Johnny Angel is a 1945 American film noir directed by Edwin L. Marin and written by Steve Fisher (adapted by Frank Gruber) from the 1944 novel Mr. Angel Comes Aboard by Charles Gordon Booth. The movie stars George Raft, Claire Trevor and Signe Hasso, and features Hoagy Carmichael.

== Plot ==
A merchant ship captain finds his father's ship – of the same line – derelict at sea, the entire crew having disappeared. From an unlisted passenger, the only survivor of the hijacking of the ship, he learns of a plot involving secret gold, and searches New Orleans for his father's murderer.

== Cast ==
- George Raft as Johnny Angel
- Claire Trevor as Lilah "Lily" Gustafson
- Signe Hasso as Paulette Girard
- Lowell Gilmore as Sam Jewell
- Hoagy Carmichael as Celestial O'Brien
- Marvin Miller as George "Gusty" Gustafson
- Margaret Wycherly as Miss Drumm
- J. Farrell MacDonald as Capt. Angel
- Mack Gray as Mack, the Bartender

== Production ==
Mr Angel Comes Aboard was published in 1944. The New York Times described it as "a tale of adventure, mystery, treachery, and murder, that reaches a happy ending amid a welter of gore." RKO bought the film rights that year, with Jack Gross originally signed to produce and Pat O'Brien mentioned as a possible star.

In July 1944, George Raft signed to play the lead and the film was to be called Johnny Angel. Ray Enright was to direct. Eventually William Pereira became producer and Edwin L. Marin was the director, his first assignment under a two-picture deal with RKO. Signe Hasso was borrowed from MGM and Claire Trevor hired to play the main female lead.

Hoagy Carmichael, who had just made his film debut in To Have and Have Not, was hired to play a small role and to sing "Memphis in June".

== Release ==
=== Box office ===
Although RKO had low expectations for the film it was an unexpected hit, earning the studio a profit of $1,192,000.

Raft went on to make a number of films with Marin including three more thrillers for RKO.

=== Critical reception ===
The staff at Variety magazine gave the film a lukewarm review, and wrote, "Johnny Angel is another in the seemingly never-ending series of maritime intrigues involving murder and lust. It is slow and plodding, with poor story development...Raft is his invariably glowering self as a guy who really handles his mitts - and the dames - while Claire Trevor and Signe Hasso are the romantic interests. Rest of the cast is weighted down too much by the story..."

Time Out film guide gave the film a positive review and wrote, "The world of Johnny Angel is very noir indeed...They all inhabit a closed world, where even pastoral idylls reek of claustrophobia and obsession. The men struggle against the towering shadows of their fathers, the women are dangerously enigmatic, and the docks of New Orleans glisten under the diffuse light of a single street-lamp. Even Hoagy Carmichael sounds eerie singing "Memphis in June." There are no black diamonds, but Johnny Angel glitters like one."
