= Radhia Nasraoui =

Tunisian lawyer

- راضية النصراوي
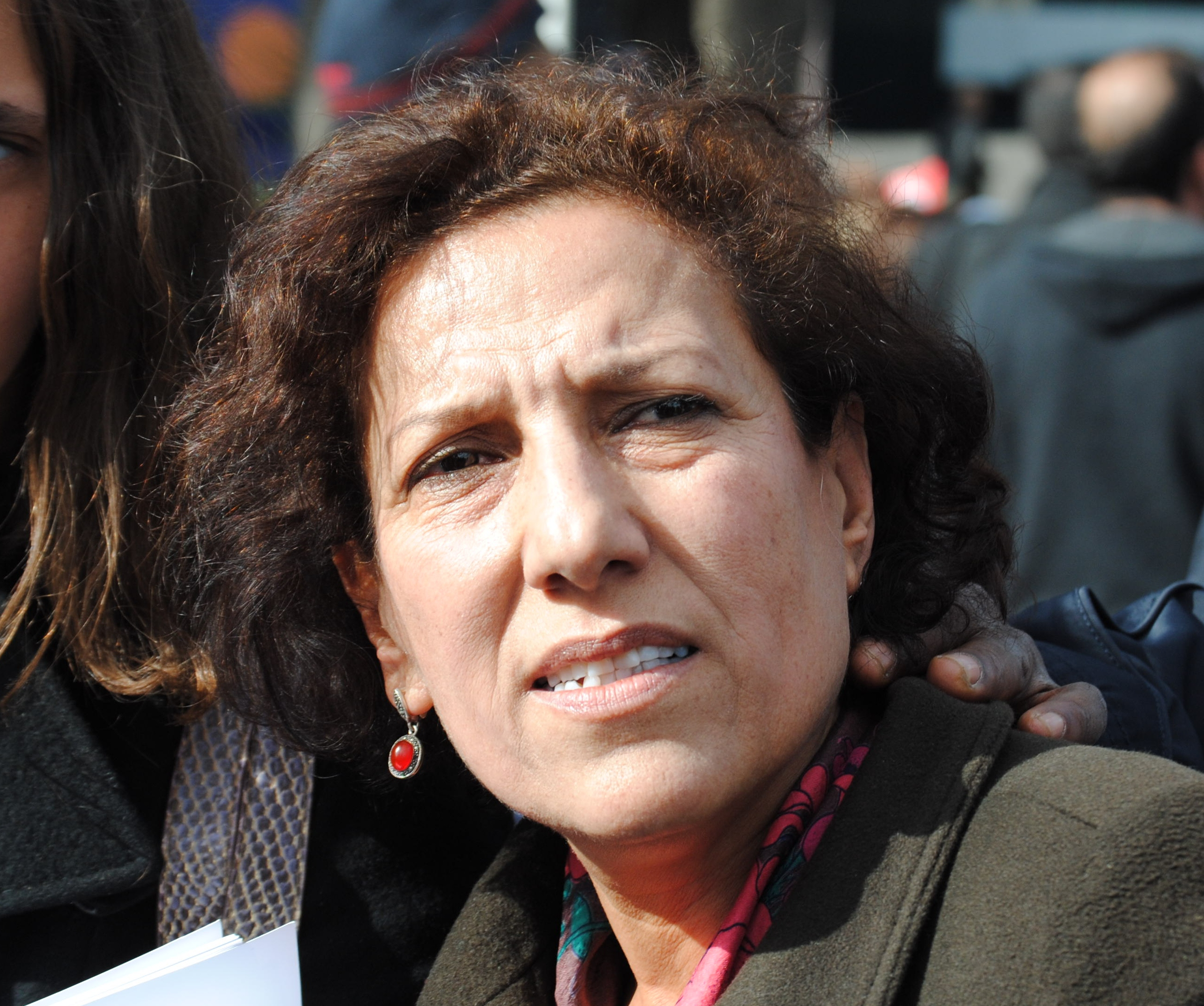

Personal details
- Born: 1953 (age 72–73) Tunis, Tunisia
- Spouse: Hamma Hammami
- Children: Nadia; Oussaïma; Sarah
- Nickname: Radhiatelli

Radhia Nasraoui (Tunisian Arabic: راضية النصراوي; born 1953) is a Tunisian lawyer specializing in human rights, who militates particularly against the use of torture.

== Struggle for human rights ==
In the 1970s, Radhia Nasraoui started campaigning for human rights, when the regime of President Bourguiba banned demonstrations by students and workers. In 1976, she managed to convince her employing firm to defend students who are accused. Two years later, in the aftermath of the Black Thursday, a general strike accompanied by bloody riots and resulting in many deaths, Nasraoui opened her own firm.

She was one of the founders of the Association against Torture in Tunisia announced that 26 June 2003. Appointed president, she denounced what she sees as the "systematic torture" practiced in her country since the accession to power of President Ben Ali 7 November 1987. Due to her professional activities in favor of human rights in Tunisia, Radhia Nasraoui continued to be exposed to repression and police brutality. The U.N. Committee on the Elimination of Discrimination against Women reported:

On 12 February 1998, the Office of Radhia Nasraoui was ransacked and most of her records stolen [...] Her house is under constant surveillance, her phone line is cut or regularly tapped. In addition, her daughters endure constant bullying. 8 May 2001, while returning from Paris, she was intercepted at the airport of Tunis and all documents (including articles on the repression in Tunisia) were confiscated. In August, her car was vandalized. Harassment of her and her daughters has increased since the beginning of January 2002.

From 15 October to 10 December 2003, she went on hunger strike "to protest against government agents' burglarizing of her office and terrorizing her family and to demand that justice should be done after a physical assault suffered in July" she put an end to the strike on the day of the commemoration of the 55th anniversary of the Universal Declaration of Human Rights.

Radhia Nasraoui continued to be exposed to state repression until the revolution of 2011 marked the fall of President Ben Ali. During this period, she was considered as a lawyer and activist against Torture and one of Tunisia's most renowned opinion leaders of the Arab Spring. Even after the revolution, she continued to denounce cases of torture and mistreatment of prisoners. She is also a member of the sponsorship committee of the Russell Tribunal on Palestine which work began 4 March 2009.

== Personal life ==
Radhia Nasraoui is married to Hamma Hammami, the secretary general of the Workers' Party since 1981, and they have three daughters, Nadia, Sarah and Oussaïma.

== Honors and awards ==
- On 16 November 2005, Nasraoui received an honorary degree by the Belgian Université libre de Bruxelles for her defense of human rights and her struggle for the emancipation of Tunisian women.
- On 25 January 2013, she received the Olof Palme Prize for Human Rights.
