= Bruce C. Harris =

Bruce Campbell Harris also known as Bruce Campbell Harris Lloyd OBE (1955, Scotland – May 30, 2010, Florida) was the Executive Director of Casa Alianza, a charity whose aims are the rehabilitation and the defence of children.

He served in this post from 1989 to September 2004, when he was fired from his post as director of Casa Alianza. According to Casa Alianza, Harris had admitted acting improperly by paying for sex with a 19-year-old Honduran who had been a resident in one of its shelters. "I assume, as I always have done, responsibility for my acts, correct or incorrect... While we all try to do our best, we are also human" said Harris.

== Personal life and career ==
Harris grew up in Dorset, and after high school he joined the conservative musical group Up with People serving as an emcee from 1975 until 1980. After returning to school with a major in International Studies, he joined Save the Children as a volunteer, and in 1989 he became the head of Covenant House's Latin American operations as executive director of Casa Alianza.

In 1993 he had to flee with his family from Guatemala when bullets were fired at the office where he worked after his investigations led to criminal proceedings being brought against police officers for the torture of street children.

In 1998, he was tried and acquitted after charges of defamation, libel and slander were brought against him by an attorney for the Defenders Association of Adoption, María Susana Luarca Saracho because of his claims about irregular adoptions in Guatemala. In 2000, Costa Rican president Miguel Angel Rodríguez accused him of plotting to damage that nation's reputation regarding its alleged child sex trade. He spoke in support of a class action lawsuit against the government of Guatemala seeking damages for alleged state sponsored genocide.

Harris' profile at speaktruth.org states that his work led to 392 criminal prosecutions of alleged crimes involving children. Most of these prosecutions occurred subsequent to Harris having filed denunciations (complaints) of child "sexual abuse."

== Allegations of misconduct ==
In 2004, Harris was dismissed from his post after he was accused of paying for sex with a 19-year-old man. This young man had, as a child, been a resident of Casa Alianza until 2002. Harris stated he resigned from Casa Alianza in order to spend more time with his family. Casa Alianza's parent organization Covenant House stated he was actually dismissed. In 2004, Harris said that he would cooperate with the Honduran prosecutors investigating Harris for allegations of sexual misconduct with children. In 2005 the case was dropped because the prosecutors could not determine if any crimes had been committed, and found no evidence that Harris had abused children while they were at Casa Alianza in Honduras.

== Awards and recognition ==
In 1991 Harris was named a "Hero of Human Rights" by Amnesty International. As director of Casa Alianza, he accepted the Olof Palme Prize in 1996. In 2000, he received the Conrad N. Hilton Humanitarian Award of one million dollars, as well as the Order of the British Empire medal. He was also listed as one of "51 heroic activists" profiled in Kerry Kennedy Cuomo's Speak Truth to Power: Human Rights Defenders Who Are Changing Our World. In 2001, he was made an Officer of the Order of the British Empire by Queen Elizabeth II of the United Kingdom, and he received the Archbishop Oscar Romero Award of the University of Dayton, USA, for his work in defending the human rights of street children in Mexico and Central America.
