= Spyridon Galinos =

Greek politician (1952–2022)

Spyros Galinos (March 1952 – 23 December 2022) was a Greek politician who served as Mayor of Lesbos from May 2014 to September 2019.

Galinos was born in Athens in March 1952 and raised in Mytilene, the capital of the Island of Lesbos.

In 1990, 1994 and 1998 he was elected City Councillor of Mytilene. In 2002, he was elected prefectural councillor, assuming the duties of Vice-Prefect at the Prefecture of Lesbos.

In 2009, he was elected to the Greek Parliament as a member of the centre-right New Democracy party. On 11 March 2012, Spiros Galinos together with ten parliamentary colleagues fled from the New Democracy party and founded with Panos Kammenos the ultra-conservative Independent Greeks party.

In 2016, he was awarded the Olof Palme Prize for his work to help people fleeing from war and terror.

Galinos died of cancer on 23 December 2022, at the age of 70.
