= Gurgen Mahari =

Armenian author and poet (1903 – 1969)

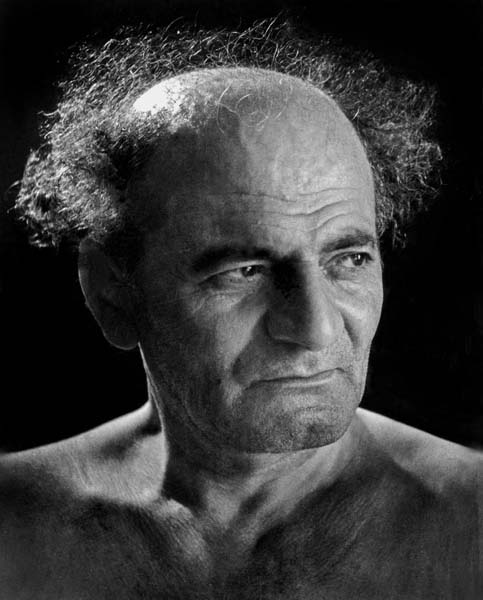
Gurgen Mahari

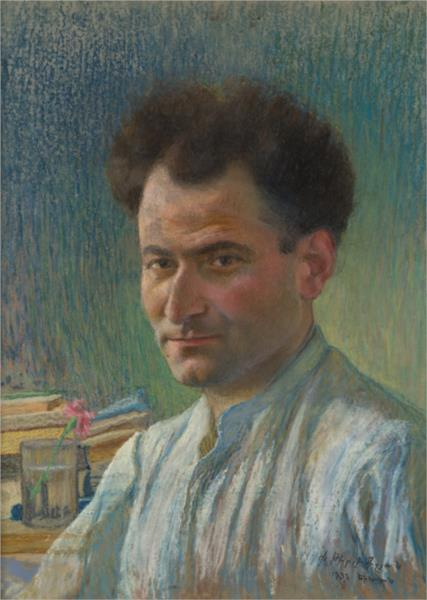
Portrait of Mahari by Panos Terlemezian (1932)

Gurgen Mahari (Armenian: Գուրգեն Մահարի, born Gurgen Grigori Ajemian; August 14 [O.S. August 1], 1903 – June 17, 1969) was an Armenian writer of prose and poetry. His most significant works include the semi-autobiographical novella Barbed Wires in Blossom (1968) and the novel Burning Orchards (1966), which is set in the writer's hometown of Van on the eve of the Armenian genocide.

== Early life ==
Born in Van in the Ottoman Empire, Gurgen fled to Eastern Armenia in 1915 during the Armenian genocide and found refuge in orphanages in Igdir, Etchmiadzin, Dilijan, and Yerevan.

== Career ==
His first book, Titanic, was published in 1924. He then wrote his autobiographical trilogy (first part, "Childhood" was published in 1929, and the third part was finished in 1955) which tells the story of his survival and the tragedy experienced by the Armenians of Western Armenia.

He was arrested in 1936, during Joseph Stalin's Great Purge and sentenced to 11 years imprisonment in a Siberian Gulag. He was released in 1947, but a year later was again arrested and sent into Siberian exile as an 'unreliable type'. He was only allowed to return to Yerevan in 1954 following Stalin's death.

He is also the author of Charents-name (1968), memoirs about Armenian poet Yeghishe Charents, and of Barbed Wires in Blossom, a novella based largely on his personal experiences in a Soviet concentration camp.

Mahari's novel Burning Orchards, which is set during the Van Uprising and the Armenian genocide, was widely condemned in Soviet Armenia for its unflattering portrayal of Armenian Marxists. Copies of Burning Orchards were publicly burned in the streets of Yerevan and Mahari was demonized by the Soviet Government. Attacks against Mahari's novel also were common in the Armenian diaspora. Today, however, Armenians consider Burning Orchards to be a masterpiece and the campaign against the novel and its author are considered to be a shameful chapter in the history of the Armenian people.

Against the wishes of his wife, a heartbroken Mahari began rewriting his novel to remove the disputed passages, but died before the revisions were complete. The original text of the novel is considered to be greatly superior and is now regarded as the canonical text.

== Works in translation ==
- Mahari, G. (2007). Burning Orchards. Translated by D. Tahta, H. Tahta and H. Ghazarian. Cambridge, UK: Black Apollo Press, Germinal Productions. ISBN 978-1-900355-57-5.
