= Singoalla (opera) =

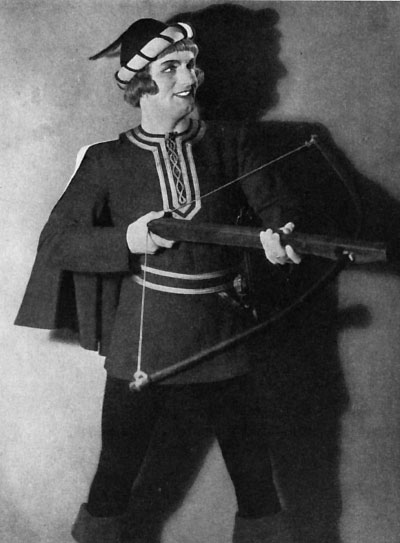
Set Svanholm as Erland Månesköld in the 1940 premiere

Singoalla is a 1940 opera in four acts by Gunnar de Frumerie to a libretto by Ella Byström (1889–1969) based on the novel with the English title The Wind Is My Lover by Swedish author Viktor Rydberg. The opera premiered on 16 March at the Royal Swedish Opera, Stockholm.

== Plot ==
The opera is set in Sweden during the fourteenth century. The plot centres on Singoalla, princess of a nomadic tribe and Erland, a young knight with whom she has a son. In acts 1 and 2 the tribe take him hostage in order to escape with items stolen from a monastery. The tribe give Erland a potion causing him to forget Singoalla and abandon her. Acts 3 and 4 resume the story after ten years have passed and Erland is now married to another woman but tormented by strange dreams in which child predicts the coming of the Black Death. At this point the child, his forgotten son, enters the plot and his service, leading to the death of the principal characters.

== Recording ==
- Anne Sofie von Otter as Singoalla (mezzo-soprano); Björn Haugan as Erland Månesköld (tenor); Per-Arne Wahlgren as Assim and as Riddar Bengt Månesköld (baritone); Catharina Olsson as Helena Ulvsax (mezzo-soprano); Erik Saedén as Pater Henrik (bass); Anders Andersson as Broder Johannes (tenor); Stig Tysklind as Hövdingen [chief of the wandering people] (bass); Inger Blom as Assim's Mother (contralto); Lasse Bergström as Sorgbarn (boy soprano); Royal Stockholm Philharmonic Orchestra, Hägerstens Motet Choir, Yuri Ahronovitch OCLC 1057122600 1988 Caprice CAP22023
