= Shaumiani =

Shaumiani შაუმიანი
- Location in Georgia Shaumiani (Kvemo Kartli)
- Coordinates: 41°20′38″N 44°45′30″E
- Country: Georgia
- Region: Kvemo Kartli
- Municipality: Marneuli
- Elevation: 493 m (1,617 ft)
- Climate: Cfa

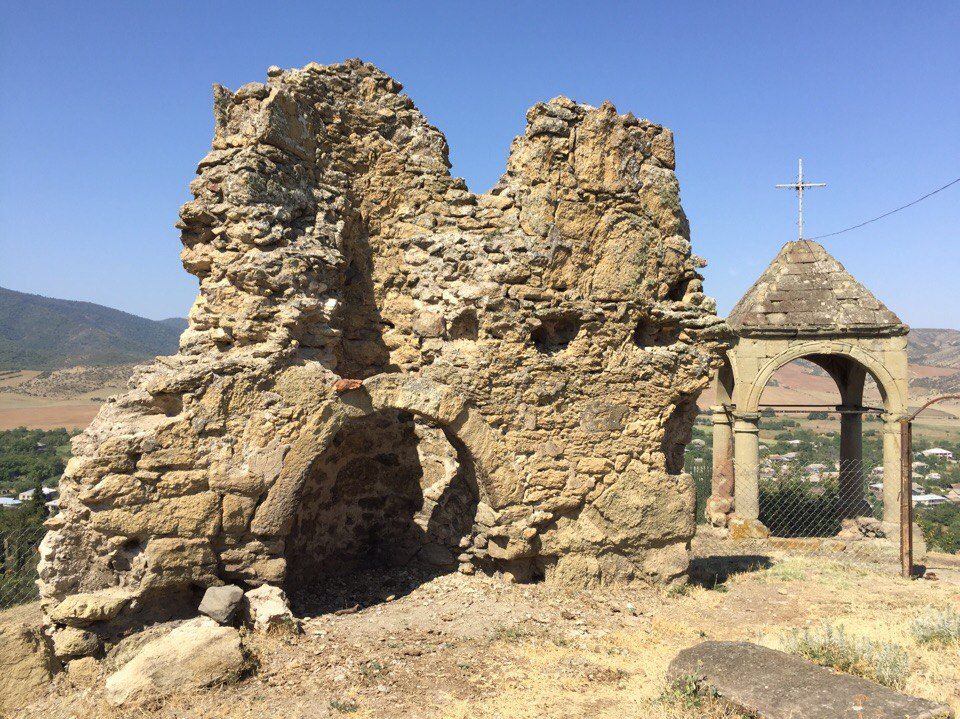
Ruins of an old Armenian church in Shaumiani

Shaumiani (Georgian: შაუმიანი, Armenian: Շահումյան, romanized: Shahumyan) is a village in the Marneuli Municipality, Kvemo Kartli region of Georgia. Until 1925 it was named Shulaveri or Shulaver (Armenian: Շուլավեր, romanized: Shulaver), later being renamed after Stepan Shahumyan. As of 2014, when it was downgraded from a small town (daba) to a village, its population was 3,107 persons.

It was the administrative center of the Borchaly uezd of the Tiflis Governorate until 1929, and of the Borchaly Rayon until 1947 when it was transferred to Marneuli and the district was renamed.

== Notable inhabitants ==
- Maro Markarian, Armenian poet
- Benjamin Markarian, Armenian astronomer
- Alexander Melik-Pashayev, Armenian conductor

== Archaeology ==
There are some important archaeological sites in this area, including those belonging to the prehistoric Shulaveri–Shomu culture. 'Shulaveri', the old name of Shaumiani, is the type site, and a part of the name of Shulaveri–Shomu culture. Research in this area emerged especially in the 21st century.

== See also ==
- Kvemo Kartli
