= Benjamin Markarian =

Armenian astrophysicist (1913–1985)

- Բենիամին Մարգարյան
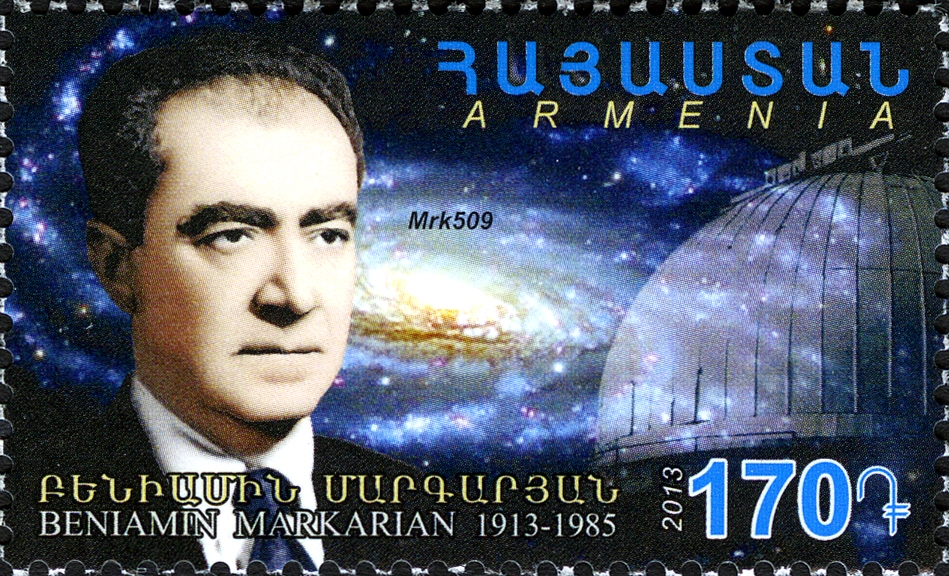
- Markarian on a 2013 Armenian stamp
- Born: Benjamin Egishevich Markarian; November 29, 1913; Shulaver, Tiflis Governorate, Russian Empire
- Died: September 29, 1985 (aged 71); Yerevan, Armenian SSR, USSR
- Scientific career
- Fields: Astrophysics

Benjamin Egishevich Markarian (Armenian: Բենիամին Եղիշեի Մարգարյան) was an Armenian astrophysicist. Markarian's Chain is a group of galaxies which was named after him when he discovered that its members move with a common motion. He is also the namesake of a catalog of compact, optically bright galaxies (including both starbursts and active galactic nuclei) known as Markarian galaxies.

== See also ==
- Category:Discoveries by Benjamin Markarian
