= Singoalla (film) =

1949 film

- French poster with Michel Auclair listed in the starring role as Erland Månesköld
- Directed by: Christian-Jaque
- Written by: Viktor Rydberg (novel The Wind Is My Lover); Pierre Véry (screenplay) and Christian-Jaque (screenplay); Bertil Malmberg (dialogue) and Romney Brent (dialogue)
- Produced by: Lorens Marmstedt (producer); Jacques Bar (producer) (uncredited); Raymond Froment (producer) (uncredited)
- Starring: Viveca Lindfors; Alf Kjellin
- Cinematography: Christian Matras
- Edited by: Jean Desagneaux; Lennart Wallén
- Music by: Hugo Alfvén
- Release date: 1949
- Running time: 63 minutes 104 minutes (Sweden)
- Countries: France; Sweden

Singoalla is a 1949 Swedish–French film directed by Christian-Jaque, starring Viveca Lindfors and Alf Kjellin. It is based on the romantic novel Singoalla by Viktor Rydberg, which in turn is based on a medieval legend of the love between a Romani woman and a nobleman. It was produced in three language versions: Swedish, French, and English. The Swedish and French versions were entitled Singoalla. The English version had three titles: Gypsy Fury (USA), The Wind is My Lover (UK), and The Mask and the Sword (UK). The Swedish and English versions starred Alf Kjellin as the nobleman, but the French version starred Michel Auclair. All three versions were edited separately – even the scoring is slightly different. The Swedish and French versions of the film run over 100 minutes; the English version runs for only 63 minutes.

== Cast ==
- Viveca Lindfors as Singoalla
- Alf Kjellin (aka Christopher Kent) as Knight Erland Månesköld - Swedish and English versions
- Michel Auclair as Knight Erland Månesköld - French version
- Edvin Adolphson as Latzo
- Lauritz Falk as Assim
- Naima Wifstrand as Cioara
- John Elfström as Erasmus
- Märta Dorff as Elfrida Månesköld
- Vibeke Falk as Helena Ulfsax
- Georg Funkquist as Chaplain
- Jean Georges Chambot (aka Johnny Chambot) as Sorgbarn
- Katarina Taikon as Gypsy Woman (uncredited)

== Depiction of the Romani People ==
Singoalla stereotypically depicts the Romani People as being uncivilised thieves. The film hired many real Romani actors, among them was Katarina Taikon, who later became a civil rights leader and writer. After the film was released, the Romani actors expressed regret about having participated in a racist movie.
