= Bruce Harris (journalist) =

English sports journalist

Stephen Bruce Harris (4 January 1887 – 4 October 1960) was an English sports journalist, prominent from the 1930s to the 1950s, who wrote mostly on tennis and cricket.

== Life and career ==
Bruce Harris was born in Derry and trained as a journalist in England, in Middlesbrough and Birmingham. He joined the Evening Standard in London in 1920 and turned his attention to sport. At first he specialised in tennis, but in 1932 the Evening Standard chose him ahead of his younger colleague E. W. Swanton, a cricket expert, to cover the forthcoming English cricket tour of Australia. He was the first journalist ever to have been sent on an overseas cricket tour by an individual newspaper.

On the voyage to Australia, Douglas Jardine, England's captain on the 1932-33 tour, was planning his bodyline tactics, which he knew would be controversial. Harris was learning how to be a cricket writer. They soon won each other's confidence. Harris supported Jardine's tactics throughout the tour, and when the tour finished he wrote his first book, Jardine Justified, for which Jardine wrote a grateful foreword. Arthur Mailey, the former Australian Test player, while deploring the closeness between Jardine and Harris, thought Jardine Justified full of "interesting and well-written passages" and better than most tour books. The reviewer for the Brisbane Telegraph noted that apart from the behaviour of the cricket crowds, Harris evidently enjoyed Australia and wrote about it enthusiastically. The reviewer for The Age noted that the book included "several entertaining chapters relating to matters other than cricket".

This "other-than-cricket" journalism became a feature of Harris's tour books. Of his book on the 1936-37 tour of Australia and New Zealand, the New Zealand Herald's reviewer wrote that between accounts of the matches Harris records "his journalist's impressions of Australia and its institutions. Gambling, life-saving on the beaches, hotel-closing, and immigration are discussed. Many a good story enlivens his pages." The Sydney Morning Herald reviewer of Harris's book on the 1946-47 tour praised his ability to rise above the partisanship that often mars cricket journalism, and said, "he is an agreeable companion in these pages, in which he shows that he has an eager capacity for observing the life and people around him as he passed [sic] from place to place". The Sydney Daily Telegraph reviewer of the same book devoted most of his review to an appreciation of Harris's chapter on Australia's liquor licensing laws.

Harris was the first journalist to accompany five touring English cricket teams to Australia, beginning with the 1932-33 tour and ending with the 1954-55 tour. He wrote a book about each Australian tour, as well as several about Test series in England in the 1950s.

Harris was the secretary of the Cricket Writers' Club soon after its founding in 1947 and later served as the club's chairman. He died at his home in Ealing after a long illness, aged 73.

== Books ==
- Jardine Justified: The Truth about the Ashes (1933)
- 1937 Australian Test Tour (1937)
- With England in Australia: The Truth about the Tests (1947)
- In Quest of the Ashes, 1950-51 (1951)
- Cricket Triumph: England versus Australia, 1953 (1953)
- Ashes Triumphant: Australia versus England, 1954-5 (1955)
- England versus South Africa, 1955 (1955)
- Defending the Ashes, 1956 (1956)
- West Indies Cricket Challenge, 1957 (1957)
- The True Book about Cricket (1958)
