= Alexander Rueb =

Dutch lawyer, diplomat, and chess official (1882–1959)

President of FIDE
- In office 1924–1949
- Preceded by: Office established
- Succeeded by: Folke Rogard

Personal details
- Born: Alexander Rueb; December 27, 1882 The Hague, Netherlands
- Died: February 2, 1959 (aged 76)

Alexander Rueb (27 December 1882 – 2 February 1959) was a Dutch lawyer, diplomat, and chess official.

He was born in The Hague. One of the founders of international chess governing body, FIDE, Rueb was elected its first president in 1924. He was succeeded by Folke Rogard in 1949. From 1923 through 1928, he was president of the Royal Dutch Chess Federation. His large and well-known chess library was destroyed by bombs in 1945, but he rebuilt it after World War II. The collection was placed in the Amsterdam University Library after his death.

Rueb was also an important figure in the field of endgame studies, simultaneously publishing two standard works: De Schaakstudie (Gouda, 1949–55, 5 vols.) and the five volume companion Bronnen van Schaakstudie.
