= Zorayr Khalapyan =

Armenian writer, novelist and dramaturgist

Zorayr Khalapyan (Armenian: Զորայր Երվանդի Խալափյան; Talış, Tartar, Nagorno-Karabakh Autonomous Oblast, Transcaucasian Socialist Federative Soviet Republic, U.S.S.R., 1 August 1933 – 18 August 2008), was an Armenian writer, novelist, and dramaturgist.

“Armenfilm” Studio used his novel in their television adaptation of Where were you, Man of God? which was nominated for five Armenian National Cinema Awards "HAYAK -2012", including Best Picture and Best Cinematography, and won three, for Best screenplay writer, Best composer and Best leading actress.

== Works ==
Zorayr Khalapyan enriched modern theater with a number of plays that have been successfully staged in Armenia, as well as in Saint Petersburg, Riga, Pärnu, Blagoevgrad (Bulgaria) theaters. The most famous plays "miracle child" and "lullaby" may be classified as one of the best dramaturgical achievements of 60s-70s.

The Knight and the Sword-bearer, (Yerevan, 2003)
Ara the Beautiful and Shamiram, (Yerevan, 1998)
Vasil the Great, Armenian Byzantium Caesar or King of the Pitcher (Yerevan, 1995)
Warm Comfort, (Yerevan, 1979)
Where Were You, Man of God? (Moscow, 1971)
