= Swedish Chess Federation =

Chess governing body in Sweden

The Swedish Chess Federation (Swedish: Sveriges Schackförbund, SSF) is the national organization for chess in Sweden. It was founded in 1917 and is headquartered in Uppsala. The organization has a 9-member board of directors led by a chairman; Håkan Jalling has been chairman since 2018.

The Swedish Chess Federation also organizes a Swedish Chess Championship.

== Chairmen ==
- 1917–1939 Ludvig Collijn, Stockholm
- 1940–1947 Erik Olson, Göteborg
- 1947–1964 Folke Rogard, Stockholm
- 1964–1965 Nils Grenander, Göteborg
- 1965–1969 Nils Kellgren, Stockholm
- 1969–1977 Birger Öhman, Stockholm
- 1977–1999 Christer Wänéus, Norrköping
- 2000–2007 Ingvar Carlsson, Linköping
- 2007–2010 Ari Ziegler, Göteborg
- 2010–2013 Anil Surender, Malmö
- 2013–2018 Carl Fredrik Johansson, Uppsala

2018- Håkan Jalling
