= Singoalla (novel) =

1857 novel by Viktor Rydberg

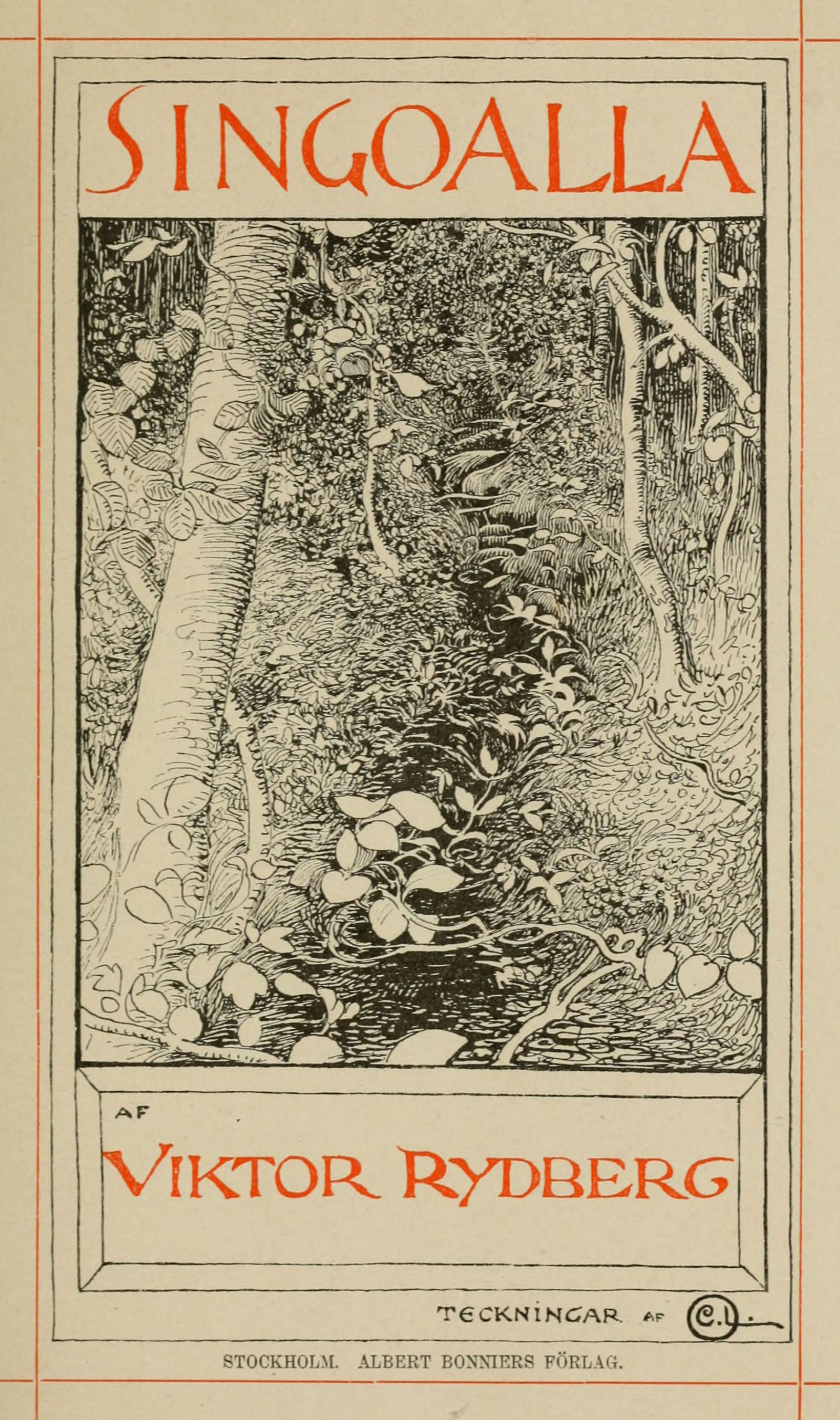
- Author: Viktor Rydberg
- Original title: Singoalla
- Language: Swedish
- Genre: Historical fiction, Romance
- Published: 1865
- Publication place: Sweden

Singoalla (1857) is a historical novel written by Swedish author Viktor Rydberg and is one of the author's most important works. The book takes place during the Middle Ages in the province of Småland and revolves around the love between the knight's son Erland Månesköld and the mysterious Romani girl Singoalla. The novel was first published in the Gothenburg calendar Aurora, then with the subtitle Romantisk sagodikt ("Romantic fairy tale poem"). The first edition of the book was published in 1865, then with a revised happy ending instead of the original unhappy one. The first English translation was published in 1904.

== Plot ==
Singoalla is set in the 1340s and 1350s and is about the love between the knight's son Erland and Singoalla, a girl of the Romani people who set camp for a few days near Erland's father's castle. Their first meeting is by the stream that runs through the forest belonging to the castle. Their meeting is short as the Romani leave again that evening, but Erland cannot forget Singoalla after this. When her people return a year later and ask Erland's father to set up camp in his forest for a week while they wait for another group, Erland sees his chance to meet her again. During this week, the young couple meet every evening and their love grows.

One evening they decide to marry by a sacred vow to each other, but Singoalla's fiancé Assim sees them and tells her father everything. The newlyweds then go and talk to Singoalla's father and it is decided that Erland will come with the Romani as they will leave on the same night. What they don't know is that the Romani people have stolen goods from the monastery where Erland was schooled and when the company has come a bit along the way, Erland's people catch up with them to take these things back. Assim's mother has already poisoned Erland, with the people behind her, and leaves the monks to choose between the goods and Erland. The people of the area choose to take Erland back home while the wandering people continue their journey. When Erland comes back to consciousness, he thinks that Singoalla was in on it all and therefore begins to hate her above all else. He marries Helena, who has been his betrothed since childhood, and they have a son together. What he doesn't know is that Singoalla has been abducted by her father and that she had been told by Assim that Erland had died. She then chooses to live with Assim, but not as husband and wife, as Assim follows her as her slave.

Several years later, she returns with Assim and her and Erland's son Sorgbarn (which translates to "Child of Sorrow"). She has found out that Erland is still alive and decides to nest Sorgbarn into his home. Sorgbarn therefore goes to the monastery and says that he wants to be Erland's slave for a hundred days and when those days have passed, the monastery would get back all the things that had been stolen from them ten years earlier. Sorgbarn claims to have dreamt about where these things are hidden. It is then decided that Sorgbarn will live with his father as a slave and serve him for a hundred days. After a while, Sorgbarn begins to hypnotize Erland at night and takes him to Singoalla, who lives hidden in the forest. At night, in his hypnosis, Erland remembers that he loves Singoalla and calls Sorgbarn his son, but during the day he hates Singoalla and Sorgbarn more and more.

It all ends with Erland outwitting Sorgbarn and killing him in the woods. However, he chooses to let Singoalla live as he has heard that the plague is on its way and thus believes that she does not have long left to live. He also promises her that he will live the rest of his life in the open air without a roof over his head. Seven days later, Erland goes to the monastery to talk to his friend Johannes. He then learns that his wife Helena has died of the plague but that his son has been taken care of by a dark girl who has taken him on his journey. Erland realizes that this girl is Singoalla. He asks Johannes to move out into the woods with him and Johannes accepts. They go out into the forest and dig a dwelling in a hill where they then live their entire lives as hermits. Several years later, a young man comes and talks to Erland, gives him a hug and then walks away again. This youth is his and Helena's son who was raised by Singoalla.

== Characters ==
- Erland Månesköld, a knight's son
- Singoalla, a Roma girl
- Assim, Singoalla's betrothed
- Sorgbarn ("Child of Sorrow"), Erland's and Singoalla's illegitimately born son
- Helena, Erland's wife
- Johannes, Erland's friend

== Editions and translations ==
The first version of the novel appeared in the Gothenburg calendar Aurora in 1857. Rydberg reworked the novel to a greater or lesser extent between editions, and when he himself published the book for the first time in 1865, the ending was completely reworked and it had a happier ending than the original unhappy one. He also continued to make changes in the later editions in 1876 and 1893, although of a less radical nature. The fourth edition from 1894 contained illustrations by Carl Larsson. The editorial Gidlunds förlag published the book for the first time in its original version in 1983 on the initiative of the author Sven Delblanc. Of Rydberg's novels, Singoalla has been published in the most editions, and from the mid-1900s it became Rydberg's most published novel in Swedish.

Singoalla is also Rydberg's most translated novel with translations to over ten languages and has been published abroad almost thirty times. A year after the novel's publication, in 1866, a Danish translation by an anonymous translator was published. In the following decades, it was translated into German (by M. L. Sunder, 1885), Dutch (Philippine Wijsman, 1899), and Finnish (Juhani Aho, 1895). Singoalla, like the rest of Rydberg's works, did not make an international breakthrough during his lifetime. The publisher Fredk. J. Crowest thus writes in the preface to Josef Fredbärj's English translation of Singoalla in 1904 that "Rydberg was during his lifetime little known outside his own country. However, it is not unlikely that Rydberg's posthumous reputation will be greater than that during his lifetime".This ended up becoming true and Singoalla is the only work by Rydberg which after the 1920s has largely remained published abroad.

== Development ==
The book is a very personal work for Rydberg, taking place in the author's home province, and he is said to have put his best efforts into it. In a letter to a friend, he wrote that "Singoalla is the daughter of my youth, and in spite of all the self-criticism I am unable to feel indifferent towards her".

== Adaptations ==
- 1940: Adapted to an opera in four acts by Gunnar de Frumerie.
- 1949: Adapted to film by the Swedish-French director Christian-Jaque.
- 1961: Made into a ballet composed by Jan Carlstedt.
- 2005: Performed as a play by the director Bobo Lundén in Hagaparken.

== See also ==
- Romani people in fiction
- Gothic fiction
