= Ytterhogdal =

- Location within Jämtland Location within Sweden
- Coordinates: 62°11′N 14°57′E
- Country: Sweden
- Province: Hälsingland
- County: Jämtland County
- Municipality: Härjedalen Municipality

Area
  - Total: 2.26 km^{2} (0.87 sq mi)

Population (31 December 2010)
  - Total: 534
  - Density: 236/km^{2} (610/sq mi)
- Time zone: UTC+1 (CET)
  - Summer (DST): UTC+2 (CEST)

Ytterhogdal (Swedish pronunciation: [ˈʏ̂tːɛrˌhʊɡːdal]) is a locality situated in Härjedalen Municipality, Jämtland County, Sweden with 534 inhabitants in 2010. Being located in the province of Hälsingland, the village has connections to three provinces due to the municipality and county having namesake provinces outside of Ytterhogdal. European route E45 passes the village The village is located close to Sweden's geographical midpoint.

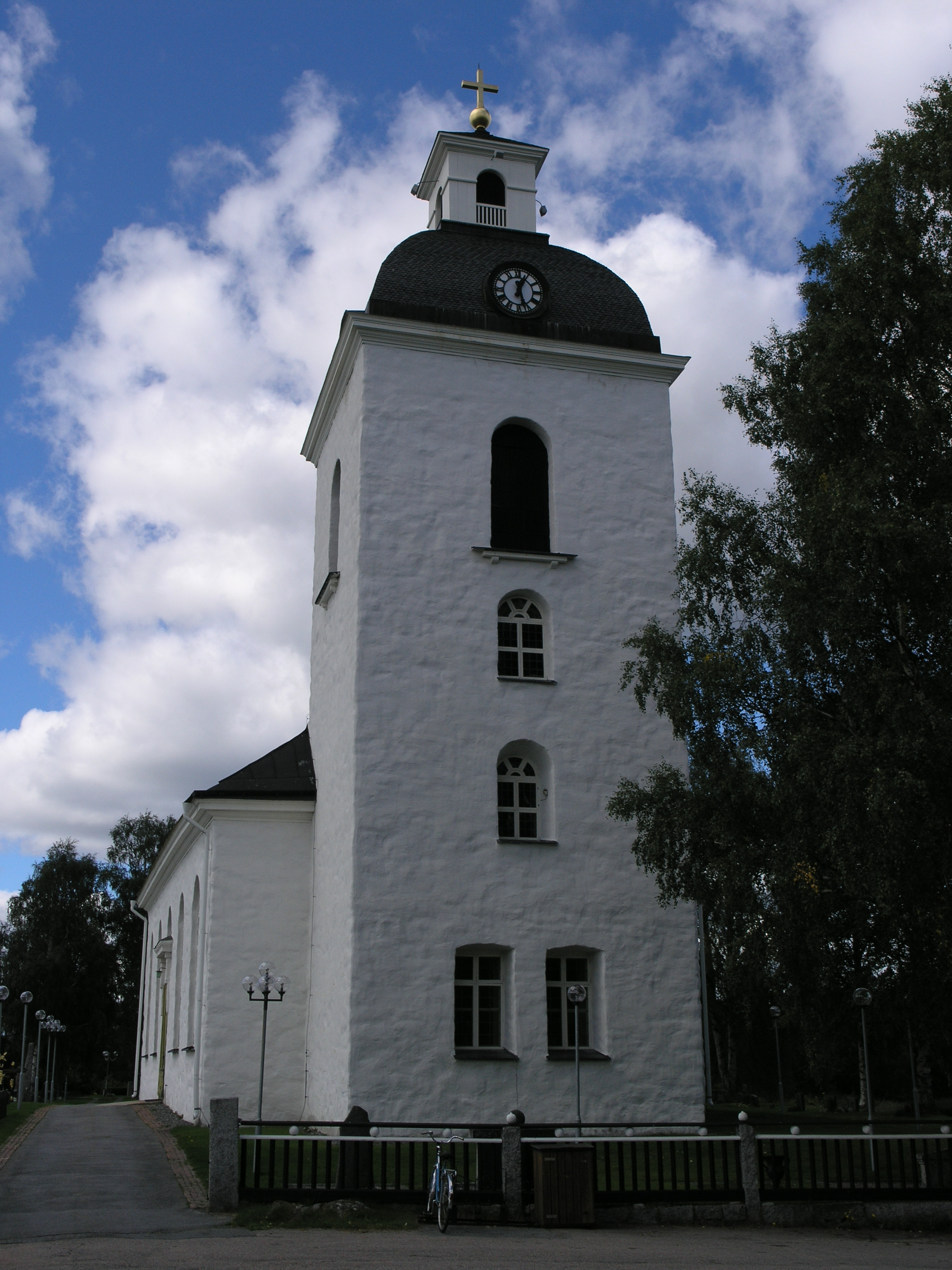
Ytterhogdal Church

Ytterhogdal Church (Ytterhogdals kyrka) is in the Diocese of Härnösand. The church building was built in the years 1799-1809 by the builder Johan Christian Loëll from Gävle. It was built in stone with a tower to the east. The sculptures in the church were made between 1839 and 1848 by Göran Sundin (1795-1857).

== Climate ==
Ytterhogdal has a highly variable subarctic climate (Köppen Dfc). The unpredictability of the climate is underlined by the all-time record high of 32.9 °C (91.2 °F) followed by an overnight air frost were recorded within three days between 12 and 15 June 2006.

Climate data for Ytterhogdal 2002–2021 (extremes since 1961)
| Month | Jan | Feb | Mar | Apr | May | Jun | Jul | Aug | Sep | Oct | Nov | Dec | Year |
|---|---|---|---|---|---|---|---|---|---|---|---|---|---|
| Record high °C (°F) | 9.5 (49.1) | 11.7 (53.1) | 15.8 (60.4) | 23.0 (73.4) | 28.0 (82.4) | 32.9 (91.2) | 32.0 (89.6) | 31.5 (88.7) | 26.2 (79.2) | 21.1 (70.0) | 14.4 (57.9) | 9.8 (49.6) | 32.9 (91.2) |
| Mean maximum °C (°F) | 4.4 (39.9) | 6.2 (43.2) | 11.2 (52.2) | 17.7 (63.9) | 24.3 (75.7) | 27.2 (81.0) | 28.5 (83.3) | 25.8 (78.4) | 21.5 (70.7) | 14.9 (58.8) | 8.5 (47.3) | 5.0 (41.0) | 29.9 (85.8) |
| Mean daily maximum °C (°F) | −4.1 (24.6) | −1.6 (29.1) | 3.6 (38.5) | 9.5 (49.1) | 14.9 (58.8) | 19.2 (66.6) | 21.5 (70.7) | 19.5 (67.1) | 14.7 (58.5) | 7.6 (45.7) | 1.4 (34.5) | −2.5 (27.5) | 8.6 (47.6) |
| Daily mean °C (°F) | −8.5 (16.7) | −6.6 (20.1) | −2.3 (27.9) | 3.3 (37.9) | 8.5 (47.3) | 12.8 (55.0) | 15.3 (59.5) | 13.6 (56.5) | 9.3 (48.7) | 3.3 (37.9) | −2.2 (28.0) | −6.5 (20.3) | 3.3 (38.0) |
| Mean daily minimum °C (°F) | −12.9 (8.8) | −11.6 (11.1) | −8.2 (17.2) | −3.0 (26.6) | 2.0 (35.6) | 6.4 (43.5) | 9.1 (48.4) | 7.6 (45.7) | 3.9 (39.0) | −1.0 (30.2) | −5.8 (21.6) | −10.4 (13.3) | −2.0 (28.4) |
| Mean minimum °C (°F) | −28.5 (−19.3) | −26.9 (−16.4) | −22.9 (−9.2) | −11.1 (12.0) | −5.2 (22.6) | −0.7 (30.7) | 2.4 (36.3) | −0.1 (31.8) | −3.3 (26.1) | −10.7 (12.7) | −18.0 (−0.4) | −24.6 (−12.3) | −31.5 (−24.7) |
| Record low °C (°F) | −43.6 (−46.5) | −40.0 (−40.0) | −37.7 (−35.9) | −22.0 (−7.6) | −11.8 (10.8) | −3.3 (26.1) | −1.6 (29.1) | −2.9 (26.8) | −8.7 (16.3) | −25.8 (−14.4) | −34.3 (−29.7) | −42.8 (−45.0) | −43.6 (−46.5) |
| Average precipitation mm (inches) | 56.1 (2.21) | 36.7 (1.44) | 32.3 (1.27) | 27.9 (1.10) | 57.2 (2.25) | 76.7 (3.02) | 84.2 (3.31) | 83.3 (3.28) | 53.0 (2.09) | 54.4 (2.14) | 49.6 (1.95) | 58.1 (2.29) | 669.5 (26.35) |
| Average extreme snow depth cm (inches) | 59 (23) | 65 (26) | 59 (23) | 32 (13) | 3 (1.2) | 0 (0) | 0 (0) | 0 (0) | 0 (0) | 5 (2.0) | 18 (7.1) | 41 (16) | 73 (29) |
Source 1: SMHI Open Data for Ytterhogdal, temperature
Source 2: SMHI Open Data for Ytterhogdal, precipitation

== Sports ==
The following sports clubs are located in Ytterhogdal:

- Ytterhogdals IK
