= Claude Loyola Allgén =

Swedish composer

Claude Loyola Allgén (16 April 1920 – 18 September 1990), officially Claude Johannes Maria Klas Thure Allgén, was a Swedish composer.

== Background and early life ==
Allgén was born in Calcutta. His family lived briefly in Pixbo (1926-1929) and then Gothenburg before moving to Djursholm, where Allgén spent most of his childhood. At age 12-13 he began studying the violin but soon switched to viola and at sixteen was accepted into the Royal Swedish Academy of Music. Here Allgén studied counterpoint with Melcher Melchers and viola with Charles Barkel. During the 1940s Allgén belonged to the ’Monday Group’ (Måndagsgruppen) along with other radical modernist composers such as Karl-Birger Blomdahl, Sven-Erik Bäck and Hans Leygraf. However, Allgén overestimated the importance of his role in the group. In 1941 he graduated from the Academy of Music and sought further studies with Hilding Rosenberg, but found little encouragement from his tutelage.

== Religious conversion ==
Due to his conversion to Roman Catholicism Allgén changed his formal first name in 1950, choosing to adopt the names Claude Johannes Maria after a number of saints. He added Loyola after his Catholic confirmation, during which the confirmed are given the choice of a patron saint; Allgén chose the Jesuit founder, Ignatius of Loyola.

== Later life and career ==
After his conversion Allgén studied for the priesthood in Innsbruck, Austria and in the Netherlands, but was never ordained. He instead retreated to Sweden where he lived as a pauper. Lacking income, Allgén was forced to live on social benefits and refused to accept early retirement. Allgén is described as a distinctive personality, which in part led to his social exclusion as a composer. Until 1973 he failed to be considered for admission into the Swedish Society of Composers, but was eventually accepted, partly as a result of influence from his composer colleague Karl-Erik Welin. Allgén’s entire musical production was long alleged to be technically unplayable but recent consideration has shown this to be untrue. Although many of the works highly technically demanding several musicians since the late 1980s have incorporated Allgén’s works into their repertoire.

== Death ==
Allgén died in a fire at his house in Täby in 1990. Due to unpaid bills the power to his property had been discontinued and it is thought most likely that he left a candle unattended as he slept. The fire destroyed parts of his musical production, including his last composition Horror Vacui, written for the Stockholm Saxophone Quartet.
