= Music of Sweden =

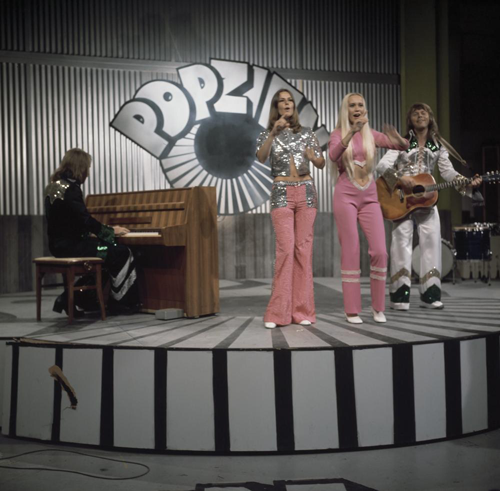
ABBA is one of Sweden's most successful pop groups.

The music of Sweden has a long history, with musical evidence dating back to the Bronze Age and the lur instruments. The Swedish fiddle and nyckelharpa are among the most common Swedish folk instruments. The instrumental genre is the biggest one in Sweden. In the 1960s, Swedish youth sparked a roots revival in Swedish folk culture. Many joined Spelmanslag (folk musicians' clubs) and performed on mainstream radio and TV. They focused on instrumental polska music, with vocals and influences from other traditional genres becoming more prominent since the 1990s. By 1970, the "dansband" culture also began. Music in Sweden is a vital part of Swedish culture, as evidenced by the national success of musical shows like Allsång på Skansen and Melodifestivalen.

Swedish music has also included more modern influences. On a per-capita basis, Sweden is one of the world's most successful exporters of music. Its most famous export is ABBA, one of the best-selling popular music groups of all time. Sweden has also historically dominated the Scandinavian music scene, with Danes and Norwegians listening to music in Swedish rather than the other way around. In the late 1980s and early 1990s, Scandinavian death metal bands became very popular with the international heavy metal community.

Throughout the history of Sweden, the Swedish monarchy have been extensive patrons; notably, Gustav Vasa and Gustav III were both considered very fond of music. Gustav Vasa encouraged musicians to attend his court, and Gustav III would found the Royal Swedish Opera and Royal Swedish Academy of Music; the latter institutions are still major promoters of Swedish music today. Sweden's most famous classic troubadour was Carl Michael Bellman, who lived from 1740 to 1795; he is famous for his extensive use of the lower class in his works. Later examples of troubadours include Evert Taube, Cornelis Vreeswijk, Fred Åkerström, and Povel Ramel. Amongst other well-known classical Swedish composers are Joseph Martin Kraus, Franz Berwald and Johan Helmich Roman.

== Traditional ==
Swedish folk songs are dominated by ballads and kulning; the latter was originally used as a cow-herding call and is traditionally sung by women. Ballad stories descend from skillingtryck printed songs from the 19th century. Modern bands like Folk och Rackare, Hedningarna and Garmarna incorporated folk songs into their repertoire.

=== Swedish folk instruments ===
The fiddle is perhaps the most characteristic and original instrument of the Swedish folk tradition. It had arrived by the 17th century, and became widespread until 19th-century religious fundamentalism preached that most forms of music were sinful and ungodly. Despite the oppression, several fiddlers achieved a reputation for their virtuosity, including Jämtland's Lapp-Nils, Bingsjö's Pekkos Per and Malung's Lejsme-Per Larsson. None of these musicians were ever recorded; the first major fiddler to be recorded was Hjort Anders Olsson. Other early fiddlers of the 20th century included Nils Agenmark and Päkkos Gustaf. There is an extensive traditional repertoire of fiddle tunes, in forms such as the 3/4 polska and the 4/4 gånglåt. One type of fiddle peculiar to Sweden is the låtfiol, a fiddle with two sympathetic strings, similar to the Norwegian Hardanger fiddle.

The nyckelharpa (keyed fiddle) is similar to both a fiddle and a hurdy-gurdy, and is known from Sweden since at least 1350, when an image of one was carved on a gate in a church in Gotland. During the 15th and 16th centuries, the nyckelharpa was known throughout Sweden, Denmark and particularly in the province of Uppland. The latter has long been a stronghold for nyckelharpa music, including through the 60s revival, which drew on musicians like Byss-Calle from Älvkarleby. The instrument played at this time was not the same as that used today; August Bohlin and Eric Sahlström made changes to the instrument that made it a chromatic and straight, more violin-like instrument. In spite of these innovations, the nyckelharpa's popularity declined until the 1960s roots revival. The nyckelharpa was a prominent part of several revival groups later in the century, especially Väsen and Hedningarna.

The Swedish bagpipes (säckpipa) has been part of a long-running folk tradition, passed down orally until the death of Gudmunds Nils Larsson in 1949. Later revivalists such as Per Gudmundson added a tuning slide and revitalized the instrument.

Accordions and harmonicas were an integral part of Swedish folk music from the beginning of the 20th century, when they contributed to the gammeldans genre. The most famous Swedish accordionist is undoubtedly Kalle Jularbo, who was famous throughout the early 20th century. Later, the accordion fell out of favour within the roots revival, and did not return until the very end of the 1970s.

=== Roots revival ===
In the 1960s, Swedish jazz musicians like Jan Johansson used folk influences in their work, resulting in an early 1970s series of music festivals in Stockholm. The Swedish Music Movement reflected a popular trend towards jazz- and rock-oriented folk music, featuring many performers who brought a new vitality to Swedish folk.

== Classical ==
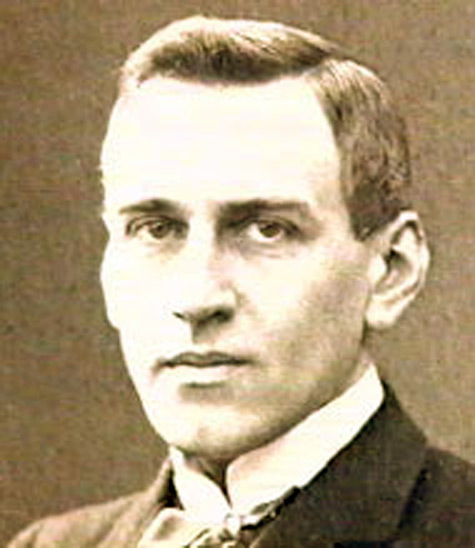
Wilhelm Stenhammar was a Swedish classical composer and a musician.

The father of Swedish classical music is often claimed to be Johan Helmich Roman (1694–1758); his most famous work is the Drottningholm Music, written for the wedding of Crown Prince Adolf Frederick. Another influential composer is Carl Michael Bellman, whose patron was the king Gustav III of Sweden. Bellman's songs are often about drinking, prostitution and everyday love troubles. He was a virtuoso improviser, and his songs, in the collections Fredmans epistlar and Fredmans sånger, are widely performed in Europe in different translations. Bellman is most notable for his extensive influence on later Swedish musical traditions. Joseph Martin Kraus (1756–1792) had a life span very similar to that of Mozart, who lived between 1756 and 1792. Kraus was an innovative composer, with a music filled with finesse and bold contrasts. His harmonic language was very personal, although his ability to develop motives never reached the level of the Viennese composers such as Mozart or Haydn. In the early romantic era, Franz Berwald (1796–1868) was the most prominent of the Swedish composers. His music was almost ignored during his lifetime, and he made his living as an orthopedic surgeon. He gained most of his recognition after his death, and composers such as Kurt Atterberg and Wilhelm Stenhammar worked hard to raise interest in Berwald's music.

Wilhelm Stenhammar (1871–1927) was one of the later national romantic composers. He was considered one of the finest pianists of his time. He studied for some years in Berlin, where he came in contact with German high romanticism, such as the music of Bruckner and Wagner, which greatly influenced his two symphonies. He also wrote six string quartets, a respectable amount of piano music and one opera, Tyrfing, on a Norse mythological subject. Another national romantic composer (also a conductor and violinist) was Hugo Alfvén (1872–1960). His orchestration is bright and colorful, reminiscent of that of Richard Strauss, although the harmonic language is quite different. Some of his works, such as the Swedish rhapsodies, are program music, that is, music intended to evoke an extramusical narrative. Alfvén appears as a character in the film The Passion of Marie.

Important composers in the early 1900s are Hilding Rosenberg, Kurt Atterberg and Ture Rangström. The best-known opera singers were the 19th-century soprano Jenny Lind and the 20th-century tenor Jussi Björling, who enjoyed great success abroad. Also the sopranos Christina Nilsson and Birgit Nilsson; tenor Nicolai Gedda; baritone Håkan Hagegård; and, more recently, soprano Miah Persson and mezzo-sopranos Anne Sofie von Otter and Katarina Karnéus—these singers have all become well known in the world of opera. Evert Taube, Povel Ramel, Cornelis Vreeswijk and Fred Akerstrom are all popular modern troubadours, considered to be classics in Swedish music. Sweden also has a very prominent choral music tradition, deriving in part from the cultural importance of Swedish folk songs and the popularity of choir schools.

=== Choral ===
Sweden has a long tradition of professional and amateur choir singing. A large percentage of the Swedes sing in amateur choirs in various styles. The choirs of Sweden are among the best in the world, with the Radio Choir, run by Sveriges Radio (Swedish public radio) being one of the world's top professional classical choirs. Lunds Studentsångförening (LSS) and Orphei Drängar (OD) are two world-class male choirs singing both in Swedish and other languages. The choir leader Eric Ericson started his career as chief conductor of OD in the 1950s. The Adolf Fredrik's Music School, in Stockholm, is commonly considered Sweden's most prestigious music school.

== Modern ==
=== Jazz ===
Well-known jazz names include: Alice Babs, who worked with Duke Ellington for many years starting in 1963, Arne Domnerus, who has recorded albums with James Moody, Art Farmer and Clifford Brown, Bengt Hallberg, Bobo Stenson, Esbjörn Svensson Trio, composer and jazz musician Georg Riedel, Georg Wadenius, best-selling jazz musician Jan Johansson, the jazz duo Koop, Lars Gullin, the multi-instrumentalist and composer Magnus Lindgren, singer and actress Monica Zetterlund, Nils Landgren, Putte Wickman, Rolf Ericson, guitarist Ulf Wakenius, and Åke Hasselgård. In addition, American jazz trumpeter Don Cherry was based in Sweden for much of his later life.

=== Popular music ===
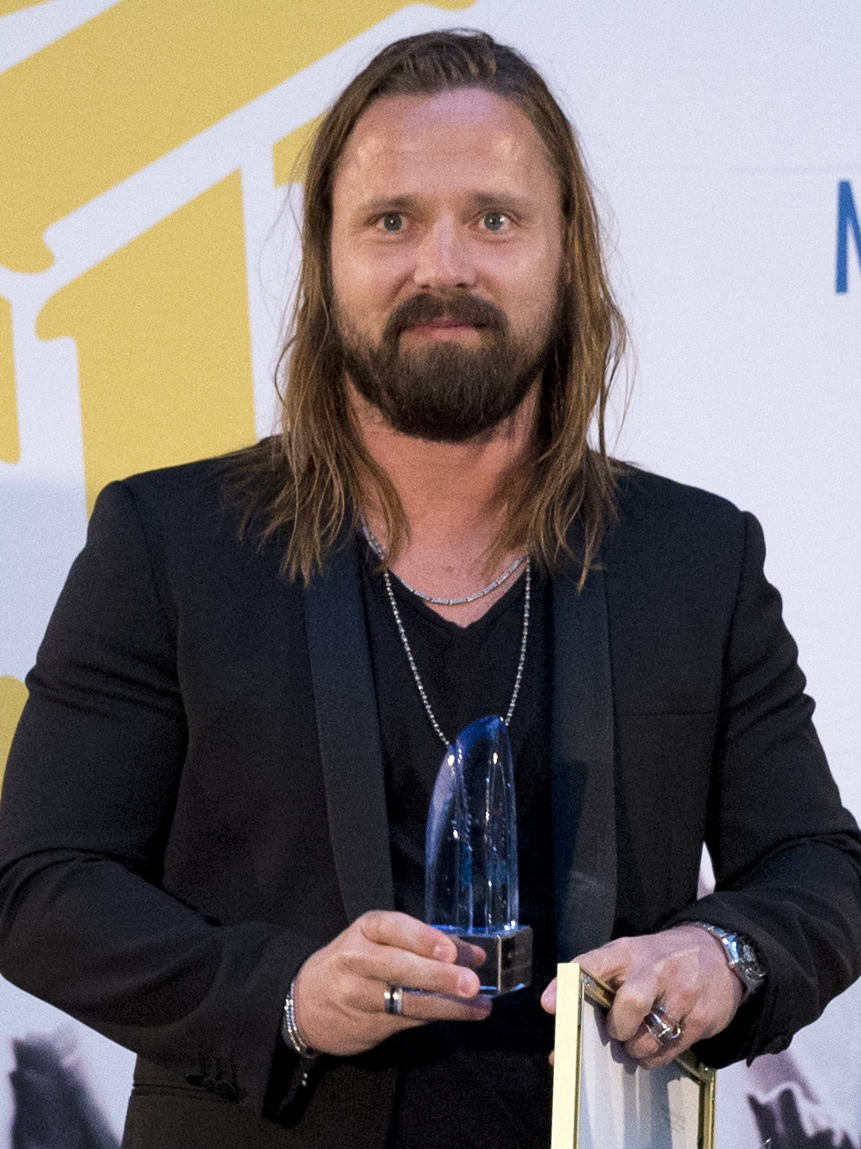
Max Martin is a popular songwriter who composed many hit songs for artists including Britney Spears and Backstreet Boys.

Sweden is one of the world's biggest exporters of music relative to the size of its economy and population. The most famous Swedish popular music act of all time is ABBA, composed of members Agnetha Fältskog, Björn Ulvaeus, Benny Andersson and Anni-Frid Lyngstad. After winning the Eurovision Song Contest 1974, ABBA grew to become the dominant pop band of the 70s and early 80s. Their sales figures are disputed but claims have been made of 380 million records around the world, making them the second-most successful group in history after The Beatles. ABBA continues to sell around one million records a year worldwide. ABBA members Benny Andersson and Björn Ulvaeus have been very successful in musical theatre, with their international hit Mamma Mia!, as well as Chess, and Kristina från Duvemåla, which was a major success in Sweden. The female members also pursued solo careers after the breakup. Agnetha Fältskog has scored various hits as a solo artist, with her 2013 album A selling up to 1.5 million copies worldwide.

ABBA marked the beginning of an era in which Swedish pop music gained international prominence, a position it still maintains today. After the UK, Sweden is the European nation with the most number-one hits on the U.S. Billboard Hot 100: as of 2019, seven recordings by Swedish artists have reached the #1 position. The first one was a 1974 cover version of "Hooked on a Feeling", performed by Blue Swede, followed by ABBA's "Dancing Queen" in 1977. Roxette had four number-one hits between 1989 and 1991: "The Look", "Listen to Your Heart", "It Must Have Been Love" and "Joyride", and in 1994 Ace of Base reached the top with their hit "The Sign".

Since the 1990s, Sweden's influence on the international pop music scene has been most evident via a number of its songwriters and producers. Cheiron Studios, spearheaded by Denniz Pop and his protégé Max Martin, helped Ace of Base become an international success, and then went on to create some of the biggest hits of Britney Spears, Backstreet Boys, NSYNC, Westlife, and later Katy Perry, Justin Bieber, Taylor Swift and The Weeknd, to name just a few. Denniz Pop died from cancer in 1998 and Cheiron Studios was closed two years later, but Martin remains a successful figure in the industry - only Paul McCartney has written more #1 Billboard hits. Other prominent producers who were part of Cheiron include Carl Falk, Rami Yacoub, Kristian Lundin, Per Magnusson and Andreas Carlsson. In Cheiron's and Max Martin's wake a number of successful producers have also emerged in later years, including Shellback, Bloodshy & Avant, and RedOne.

The success of Swedish popular music is also evident in the Eurovision Song Contest. The contest attracts great interest and the Swedish entrant is selected through Melodifestivalen, a series of qualifiers which is Sweden's most popular television show. Since ABBA's win in 1974, Sweden has won the Eurovision Song Contest a further six times: in 1984 with Herreys, in 1991 with Carola Häggkvist, in 1999 with Charlotte Nilsson, in 2012 with Loreen, in 2015 with Måns Zelmerlöw, and most recently in 2023 again with Loreen. With these seven wins, Sweden is tied with Ireland for the most Eurovision victories.

Some of the most successful post-ABBA popular music artists from Sweden are Europe, Roxette, Madleen Kane, Agnes, Ace of Base, Kent, Carola Häggkvist, Army of Lovers, Neneh and Eagle-Eye Cherry, Leila K, Robyn, A*Teens, Nanne Grönvall, The Cardigans, BWO, Andreas Johnson, Alcazar, and September. A number of renowned rock and pop-oriented artists have come out of the country in recent years, including Eskobar, Bob Hund, Clawfinger, The Sounds, The Hives, Hardcore Superstar, Millencolin, Sahara Hotnights, The Hellacopters, The Ark, Infinite Mass, Mando Diao, Looptroop Rockers and José González. The Knife and Jens Lekman have both received significant underground acclaim in recent years. Such has been the success of music abroad that clubs specializing in Swedish music have sprung up in major cities like Berlin, Barcelona and London. Rock band Kent are also often regarded as a pop band based on the variety of sounds found on their various albums.

Some Swedish easy listening/contemporary groups and artists who are not as well known internationally, but are recognized in Sweden, include Gyllene Tider, Peter Jöback, Lill-Babs Svensson, Marie Fredriksson, Laleh, Per Gessle, Ted Gärdestad, Helen Sjöholm, Charlotte Perrelli, Loreen, Sanna Nielsen, Lena Philipsson and Patrik Isaksson. Many bubblegum dance artists emerged from Sweden, including Smile.dk, made famous by the videogame Dance Dance Revolution.

- ABBA – pop
- Ace of Base – pop
- Anna Ternheim – indie pop
- Agnes Carlsson – pop, electropop, dance
- Avicii – DJ, electronic dance music
- Basshunter – eurodance, trance, electropop
- Benjamin Ingrosso - dance-pop, electropop, R&B
- BWO – electro, pop, dance
- Carola Häggkvist – pop
- Di Leva – indie pop, rock
- El Perro del Mar – indie pop
- First Aid Kit – Swedish folk duo
- Håkan Hellström – indie pop
- I'm from Barcelona - pop
- iamamiwhoami – electropop, alternative, experimental
- Icona Pop – dance-pop, electropop
- Jay-Jay Johanson – experimental, pop
- Jens Lekman – indie pop
- Kleerup – pop
- The Knife – electropop
- Laleh – folk, pop
- Leila K – eurodance
- Loreen – pop
- Lasse Lindh – indie pop
- Lykke Li – electropop, indie pop, experimental
- Måns Zelmerlöw – pop
- Markus Krunegård – pop
- Molly Sandén – pop
- Miike Snow – indie pop
- Omar Rudberg – pop
- Otto Knows – DJ, electronic dance music
- The Radio Dept. – dream pop, shoegaze
- Rednex – pop, eurodance, country
- Robin Bengtsson – pop
- Robyn – electropop, dance-pop,
- Roxette – pop, pop rock, soft rock, dance-pop, power pop
- Sanna Nielsen – pop
- September – pop, dance-pop, house
- Shellback – music producer
- Shout Out Louds – indie pop
- Sophie Zelmani – folk, indie pop
- Suburban Kids with Biblical Names – twee pop, indie pop
- Swedish House Mafia – electronic dance music group
- The Fooo Conspiracy – pop group
- The Tallest Man on Earth – folk
- The Tough Alliance – indie pop, electropop
- Tove Lo – pop, electropop
- Tove Styrke – electropop, synthpop
- Veronica Maggio – pop
- Zara Larsson – dance-pop, R&B, electropop

=== Hip-hop ===
While jazz, blues and soul have been around for a long time in Sweden, hip-hop is a more recent addition. Swedish hip-hop emerged in the first half of the 1980s and crossed into the mainstream a decade later. Artists that achieved mainstream popularity in the early 1990s include Just D, Infinite Mass and The Latin Kings. In the late 1990s there was a second breakthrough and artists like Petter, Ken Ring, Thomas Rusiak, Timbuktu and Looptroop Rockers became well known. More recent acts worth mentioning are Promoe (of Looptroop Rockers), Roffe Ruff, Snook, Ison & Fille, Maskinen, Million Stylez, Rebstar, Adam Tensta, and Drain Gang. Swing hip-hop jazz also has made a mark with the band Movits! as a frontrunner.

=== Rock ===
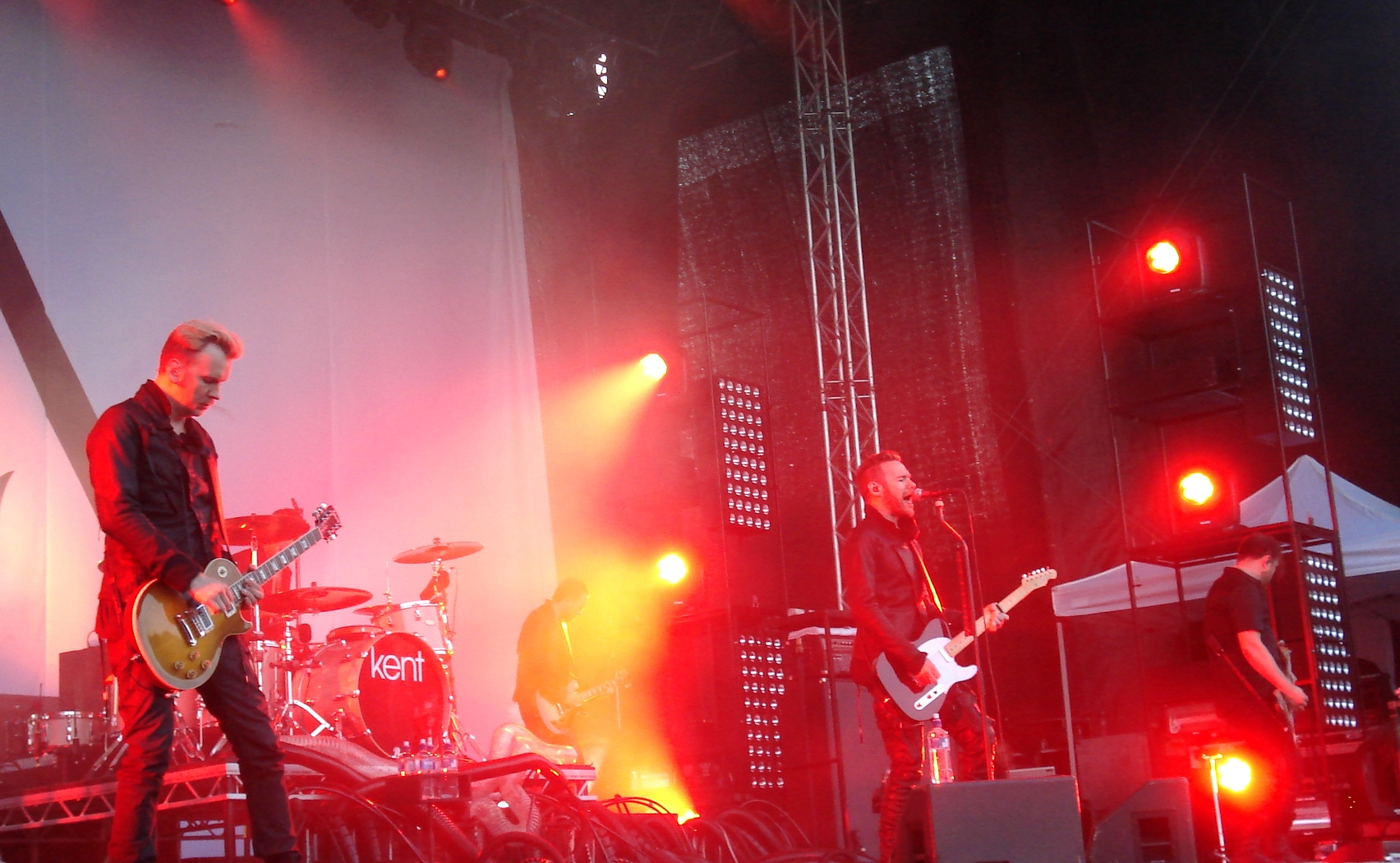
Kent performing in 2010

While rock is not as widespread in Sweden as pop or metal are, there are some very interesting acts. The 1990s saw the rise of Kent, who became the most popular Swedish rock band in Scandinavia until they disbanded in 2016; Kent is still one of the most popular acts in Sweden and Scandinavia.

Some of Sweden's rock bands include:

- The Ark
- Backyard Babies
- bob hund
- Broder Daniel
- The Cardigans
- Drain STH
- Dungen
- Europe
- Eldkvarn
- H.E.A.T
- The Hellacopters
- The Hives
- The Knockouts
- Johnossi
- Kent
- Mando Diao
- Moneybrother
- Millencolin
- Peter Bjorn and John
- Sahara Hotnights
- Shout Out Louds
- The Sounds
- The Spotnicks
- The Soundtrack of Our Lives
- Takida
- Timo Räisänen

=== Punk rock ===
The most prominent and important Swedish punk rock band is Ebba Grön (1977–1982) headed by Joakim Thåström. Thåström also had two other bands called Imperiet and Peace, Love & Pitbulls but they were very pop influenced and never became anywhere near as popular as Ebba Grön. However, Thåström is still big in Sweden, now as a solo artist.

Sweden is also home to several influential emo and hardcore punk bands, such as Fireside, Last Days Of April, Satanic Surfers, Kelly 8 and landmark post-hardcore band Refused. More aggressive early hardcore punk bands include Asta Kask, Charta 77, Mob 47, Anti Cimex, Totalitär, Homy Hogs, T.S.T, Headcleaners, and The Shitlickers. Some later influential bands of the aggressive sort are for example Disfear, Driller Killer, Wolfbrigade, Loudpipes, Warvictims, Bombshell Rocks, and Raised Fist.

=== Heavy metal ===
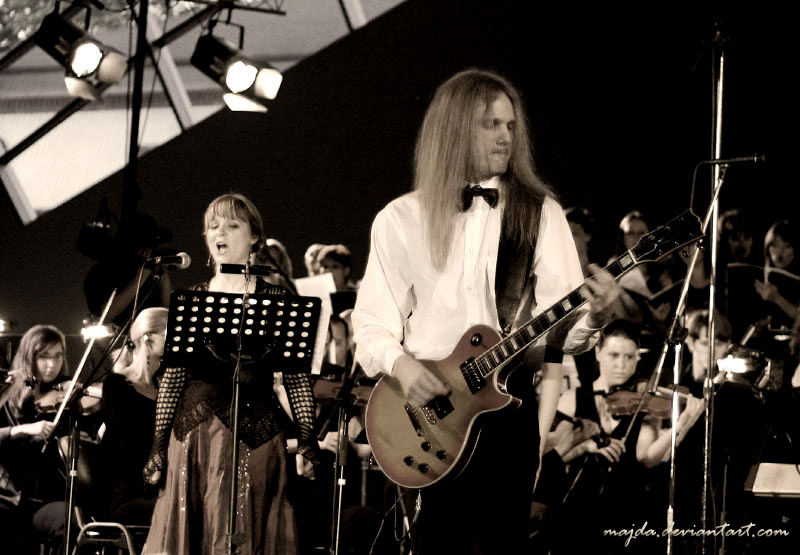
Therion is considered one of the pioneers of symphonic metal.

Sweden (along with Scandinavia at large) is known for its large number of heavy metal bands, so much so that this phenomenon has attracted scholarly analysis. Sweden is second only to neighboring Finland in heavy metal bands per capita.

Swedish musicians were instrumental in the creation of melodic death metal, also known as Gothenburg metal, particularly the bands Arch Enemy, In Flames, At the Gates, and Dark Tranquility. These bands later developed their style further, adding new influences and inspiring other acts like the American melodic metalcore bands. Bathory is credited for helping create black metal, a style that became popular in Norway, as well as pioneering Viking metal, and deceased black metal icon Per Yngve Ohlin was from Sweden. Dissection is also noted for their large influence on Swedish black metal, in particular melodic black metal. The country is also well known for death metal, progressive, doom and power metal bands. Stockholm band Candlemass is one of the first and most influential doom metal bands, starting in 1984. Yngwie J. Malmsteen is one of the fathers of neo-classical metal. Meshuggah is an avant-garde metal band which developed djent from the late 80s and 90s. Opeth is regarded as one of the most influential and innovative metal bands, crossing melodic death metal and progressive rock between the 90s and the 2000s. Passenger is considered the swan song of the nu metal scene in the early 2000s. Other famous bands include Pain of Salvation, Entombed, Dismember, Hypocrisy, Amon Amarth, Amaranthe, Soilwork, Freak Kitchen, Sabaton and more.

Some of the prominent metal acts are:

- Ablaze My Sorrow
- Abruptum
- Aeon
- Amaranthe
- Amon Amarth
- Anata
- Angtoria
- Arch Enemy
- Arckanum
- At the Gates
- Avatar
- Bathory
- Beseech
- Bloodbath
- Bloodbound
- Brothers of Metal
- Candlemass
- Carnage
- Carnal Forge
- Cemetary
- Centinex
- Count Raven
- Crashdïet
- The Crown
- Crucified Barbara
- Cult of Luna
- Dan Swanö
- Dark Funeral
- Dark Tranquillity
- Darkane
- Deathstars
- Deranged
- Desultory
- Diabolical Masquerade
- Diabolique
- Dismember
- Dissection
- Draconian
- Dragonland
- Dream Evil
- The Duskfall
- Edge of Sanity
- Enforcer
- Entombed
- Europe
- Evergrey
- Falconer
- Gates of Ishtar
- Ghost
- Grave
- Grotesque
- HammerFall
- Hardcore Superstar
- The Haunted
- Hypocrisy
- In Flames
- In Mourning
- In Solitude
- Insision
- Kaamos
- Katatonia
- King of Asgard
- Lake of Tears
- Liers in Wait
- Lifelover
- Lord Belial
- Yngwie Malmsteen
- Månegarm
- Marduk
- Meshuggah
- Morgana Lefay
- Naglfar
- Nasum
- Necrophobic
- Netherbird
- Nifelheim
- Nightingale
- Nocturnal Rites
- October Tide
- One Man Army and the Undead Quartet
- Opeth
- Ophthalamia
- PAIN
- Pain of Salvation
- The Project Hate MCMXCIX
- Raubtier
- Regurgitate
- Repugnant
- Sabaton
- Sacramentum
- Satanic Slaughter
- Scar Symmetry
- Setherial
- Seventh Wonder
- Shining
- Siebenburgen
- Silencer
- Soilwork
- Sonic Syndicate
- Spawn of Possession
- Steelwing
- Therion
- Thyrfing
- Tiamat
- Twilight Force
- Unanimated
- Unleashed
- Valkyrja
- Vildhjarta
- Vintersorg
- Visceral Bleeding
- Vomitory
- Watain
- Witchery
- Wolf
- Zonaria

Successful progressive/psychedelic acts are for example Bo Hansson, Dungen, Anekdoten, Morte Macabre, Opeth and Paatos. Finland and neighboring Norway are also crucial centers of controversial rock music genres, including black metal, death metal, and techno-rock movements since the 1980s and 1990s.

=== Progressive and jazz-rock music ===
Sweden is also known in some circles for its progressive and jazz-rock musicians, particularly for virtuoso-led acts including Andromeda, Anekdoten, Änglagård, Arbete och Fritid, Björn J:son Lindh, Bo Kaspers Orkester, Janne Schaffer, Kaipa, Landberk, Samla Mammas Manna, Opeth, The Flower Kings, and Beardfish. One of the most unusual progressive music artists in Sweden has been avant-garde singer iamamiwhoami.

==== Progg ====
During the 1970s, the progg (not to be confused with progressive rock) movement gained popularity. Progg, originally an abbreviation of "progressiv musik" ("progressive music"), was an umbrella term for much of the alternative music of this era. Some of those artists were progressive in a musical sense, such as Bo Hansson, Samla Mammas Manna and Träd, Gräs och Stenar. Others were progressive mainly in a political (usually left-wing) and lyrical sense, such as Nationalteatern, Blå Tåget and Hoola Bandoola Band.

=== Reggae ===
Reggae is also a major part of modern Swedish music. An early pioneer of Swedish reggae was Peps Persson, who Bob Marley once said was the only white man with reggae in his blood. Since then, more has happened. The Uppsala group Labyrint is widely spread with their musical mix of rap and reggae called förortsreggae. Swedish music producers Soundism are behind Swedish reggae artists Kapten Röd, Papa Dee, Million Stylez, and Chilly & Leafy (and more), also records with international artist such as Junior Ketlly, Lady Saw, and Buju Banton.

=== Electronic music ===
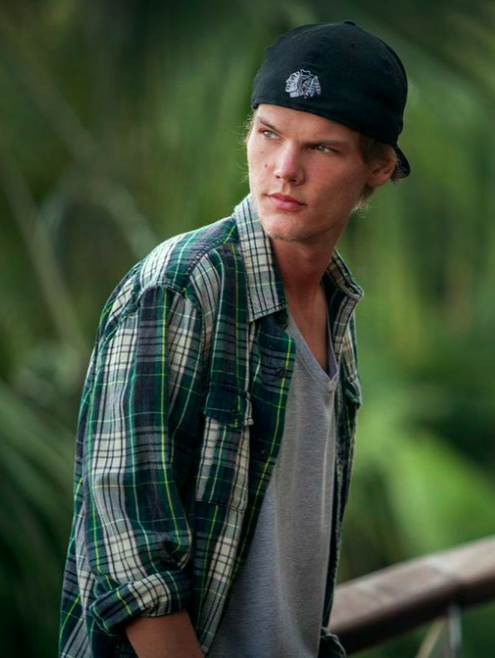
Tracks from DJ and producer Avicii reached high positions on worldwide music charts.

Electronic music in Sweden has been heavily influenced by German electronic music. The EDM act Swedish House Mafia, consists of Steve Angello, Sebastian Ingrosso and Axwell, has topped house music charts and DJ top 10s around the world. In 2011, Avicii (real name Tim Bergling) was voted the sixth best DJ in the world in the Top 100 DJ poll. His music remained popular until his death by suicide in 2018. Other similar artists of note are John Dahlbäck, Manse, Eric Prydz, Nause, Albin Myers, the duo Dada Life, Galantis, Adrian Lux, Basshunter, Otto Knows, Alesso, Rebecca & Fiona, Cazzette, Jakob Liedholm, Sebjak, AronChupa, Icona Pop, Will & Dan, Brohug and Tjernberg.

Singer and producer Robyn has long been one of Sweden's most prominent electropop acts. In the synth world, the band S.P.O.C.K has been active since the late 1980s. Secretive duo The Knife was highly rated among critics, and Sally Shapiro, is the pseudonym of producer Johan Agebjörn and a Swedish singer.

In the mid to late 2000s Swedish-language Eurodance & Eurotrance dance music became internationally popular. In 2006, Basshunter became popular with his eurotrance dance songs, based on long-standing themes set in mid to late 2000s computer-centric culture. Little Dragon and Alcazar are also Swedish.

There are many techno producers from Sweden, though they are often better known internationally than within Sweden. There is even a special Swedish subgenre of techno, the best-known producer within this genre being Adam Beyer, head of the Drumcode label with notable artists such as Cari Lekebusch, Joel Mull, and Henrik B.

In addition, Sweden is one of the leading countries in the world when it comes to chiptunes, or bitpop. Chip music is music made to run on old game consoles and specialized PCs, like the Amiga, Commodore 64, or Game Boy; Other notable acts include Slagsmålsklubben, Crazy Q, Coma, Covox, Goto80, Maktone, Random, Wintergatan, Zabutom, The Knife, Zeigeist and Machinae Supremacy. Elektronmusikstudion (EMS), formerly known as Electroacoustic Music in Sweden, is the Swedish national centre for electronic music and sound art. The research organisation started in 1964 and is based in Stockholm.

== See also ==
- List of Swedes in music
- Royal Swedish Academy of Music
- Gothenburg Symphony Orchestra
- Swedish Federation of Young Musicians
- Culture of Sweden
- Sweden in the Eurovision Song Contest
