= The Monday Group =

Group of Swedish composers, musicians and musicologists

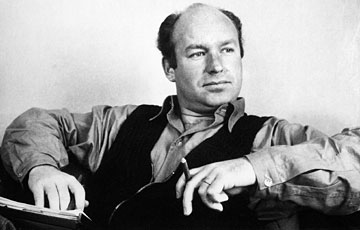
Swedish composer Karl-Birger Blomdahl (1916–1968).

The Monday Group (sv. Måndagsgruppen) was an influential group of Swedish composers, musicians and musicologists. The group was formed in 1944 and gathered a group of young composers in the apartment of the group's leader Karl-Birger Blomdahl. During the meetings the members discussed music aesthetics and compositional process and technique, in particular Paul Hindemith's Unterweisung im Tonsatz. The core of the group consisted of Karl-Birger Blomdahl, Sven-Erik Bäck, Sven-Eric Johanson, Ingvar Lidholm, Claude Loyola Allgén and Hans Leygraf. Other people, for example Claude Génetay, Göte Carlid, Hilding Rosenberg and Ingmar Bengtsson also participated at times.

Musically the group had a modernist approach inspired by German avant-garde. Most of the members rejected the late-romantic and neo-classical ideals that were present in Sweden at the time.

Måndagsgruppen participated in cultural and musical debate and played an important role in the stylistic changes towards modernism that came during 1950–1960. Several of the members became professors in composition.
