= Björn Haugan =

Swedish opera singer

Björn Haugan (5 September 1942 – 8 January 2009) was a Swedish born, Norwegian operatic lyric tenor.

== Background ==
Björn Haugan was born in Söderhamn Municipality in the province of Hälsingland within Gävleborg County, Sweden. He was the son of Arne Gudbrand Haugan (1917-1997) and Anna Gunhild Widell (1920–2008). He trained under Arne Sunnegårdh at the Royal College of Music, Stockholm.

== Career ==
Bjørn Haugan made his first appearance with The Norwegian Opera and Ballet in Oslo during 1971.

Haugan is perhaps most frequently associated with his performance in the 1983 Swedish film, Två killar och en tjej, which was directed by Lasse Hallström. Haugan was featured as a tenor in a number of operas which have been recorded with the Danish National Symphony Orchestra, Swedish Radio Symphony Orchestra and the Royal Opera House.

- Aniara – Karl-Birger Blomdahl (composer) Swedish Radio Symphony Orchestra (1994)
- Gilgamesh – Per Nørgård (composer) Danish National Symphony Orchestra (1993)
- Singoalla – Gunnar de Frumerie (composer) Orchestra of The Royal Opera (1994)
- Requiem – Otto Olsson (composer) Orchestra of The Royal Opera (1997)
