= Erik Saedén =

Swedish opera singer

- Born: 3 September 1924; Vänersborg
- Died: 3 November 2009
- Genres: opera
- Instrument: bass-baritone

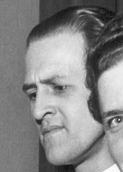
Erik Sædén (1951)

Carl Erik Sædén (3 September 1924, in Vänersborg – 3 November 2009), was a Swedish bass-baritone whose career was principally centred on Stockholm, both on the operatic stage as well as the concert platform. He made a few recordings and appeared in the 1975 Bergman film of The magic flute.

== Career ==
Sædén studied at the Kungliga Musikhögskolan in Stockholm from 1943–52, his teachers there including Arne Sunnegårdh, Martin Öhman and Wilhelm Freund. He received degrees in higher cantor and organist degree from the Royal College of Music in 1946, and a degree in vocal teaching 1952. Having joined the choir of Engelbrekt Church in 1944 (where he later sang in the St Matthew Passion), Saedén studied in Rome in 1952 and at the Salzburg Mozarteum in 1952, 1954 and 1955.

In 1965, he became a member of the Stockholm Music Academy, and in 1966 a Swedish hovsångare (court singer by special appointment). From 1957 to 1983 he was a singing teacher at the Royal College of Music, Stockholm. In 1974 he received the medal of Litteris et artibus. At the same time, he worked as a teacher at the Royal Music Academy in Stockholm.

Sædén first appeared at the Royal Opera in Stockholm in 1952 and was a member of the company until 1981. Among over 100 roles which he sang were the Count (Le Nozze di Figaro), Beckmesser, Wolfram (Tannhäuser), Scarpia, Jochanaan, Golaud, Pimen, Wozzeck (Swedish premiere, 1957) and Nick Shadow in The Rake's Progress (Swedish premiere, 1961).

He created roles in several opera premieres:

- Ture Rangström: title role in Gilgamesj (Stockholm, 1952)
- Karl-Birger Blomdahl: Mimaroben in Aniara (1959)
- Lars-Johan Werle: Julien in Drömmen om Thérèse (1964)
- Hilding Rosenberg: Don Felix in Hus med dubbel ingång
- Franz Berwald: Saint Phar in The Queen of Golconda, (1968, centennial premiere)
- Luigi Dallapiccola: title role in Ulisse (Deutsche Oper, Berlin, 1968)
- György Ligeti: Nekrotzar in Le Grand Macabre (1978)
- Lars Runsten: Amorina (1993).

Appearances outside Sweden included Bayreuth (Kurwenal in Tristan und Isolde, Herald in Lohengrin and Donner in Rheingold), the Edinburgh Festival in 1959 and 1974), Savonlinna in 1989 (Henrik in Singoalla by Gunnar de Frumerie), Hamburg, the Royal Opera House Covent Garden (1960, 1981), Montreal (1967), Moscow, Munich and Oslo.

== Recordings ==
- Mimaroben in Aniara by Karl-Birger Blomdahl (also television)
- Unzu in Tranfjädrarna by Sven-Erik Bäck (also television)
- Die Winterreise (Franz Schubert)
- St Matthew Passion under the baton of Eric Ericson (1963) – arias
- art songs by Johannes Brahms, Claude Debussy, S. von Koch, Modest Mussorgsky, Ture Rangström, Birger Sjöberg, Wilhelm Stenhammar and Evert Taube
- Den glada änkan by Franz Lehár
- Speaker in Trollflöjten by Mozart, HMV (1975)
- Barfotasånger by Allan Pettersson, Swedish Society
- Fader Henrik in Singoalla by Gunnar de Frumerie, Caprice
- Rheingold by Richard Wagner, Melodram
- Leporello in Don Giovanni by Mozart
- The Marriage of Figaro by Mozart (Drottningholm, video)
