= Sven-Eric Johanson =

Swedish composer and organist

- Born: 10 December 1919; Västervik
- Died: 27 September 1997 (aged 77); Gothenburg

Sven Eric Emanuel Johanson (10 December 1919 - 29 September 1997) was a Swedish composer and organist.

== Biography ==
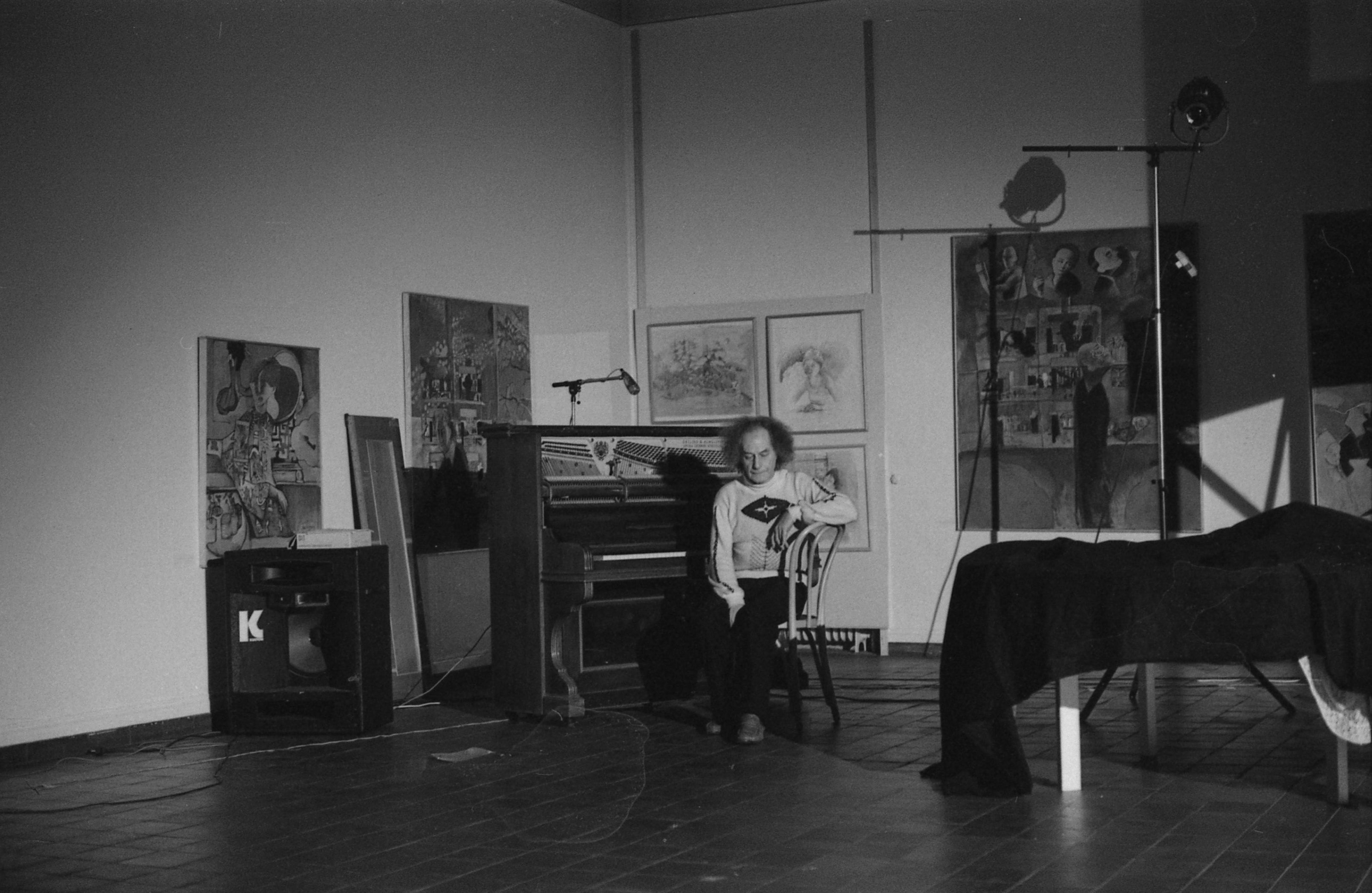
Sven-Eric Johanson

Sven-Eric Johanson was born to Hjalmar and Beda Johanson in Västervik in 1919. The parents were both officers in the Salvation Army, but in 1926 Hjalmar became a pastor in Missionsförbundet instead. He began his formal music studies in 1938 at the Ingesund College of Music and was accepted to the Royal College of Music, Stockholm in 1939.

During his time as a student in Stockholm, Johanson studied composition with Melcher Melchers and organ with Otto Olsson and Alf Linder. In 1944 Johansson became the director of music at Uppsala Missionskyrka. In the 1940s Johanson studied Ernst Krenek's book on the twelve-tone technique and employed it in his 1949 Sinfonia ostinata.

In 1952 he became the organist at Hagens kapell (today Älvsborgs kyrka) in Gothenborg, a position he held until 1977.

He was a founding member of The Monday Group. In 1971 he became a member of the Royal Swedish Academy of Music.

He is buried on the Stampen cemetery in Gothenburg.

== Works ==
Johanson wrote twelve symphonies and several operas. He composed a number of concertos, some for unusual instruments like balalaika and nyckelharpa. He was a prolific composer of choir music.

He has written a hymn in the 1986 Swedish Hymnal, no. 214a, Lär mig att bedja av hjärtat.

=== Selected works ===
==== Works for orchestra and chamber ensemble ====
- Sinfonia ostinata, symphony no. 1, 1949/54
- Sinfonia elegiaca, symphony no. 2B, 1654-1955
- Symfoni no. 3, 1956
- Konsert för balalajka och stråkorkester, 1961
- Variationer över en värmländsk orrlåt, 1963
- Elementsymfonin (Etemenanki), symphony no. 5, 1965–68
- Concerto Gotenburghese, piano concerto, 1970
- Konsert för nyckelharpa och stråkorkester, 1971
- Sinfonietta pastorella, symphony no. 6, 1972
- Spelmanssymfoni för stråkorkester, symphony no. 7, 1974
- En Frödingsymfoni för solister, kör och orkester, symphony no. 8, 1983–84
- Sinfonia d'estate, symphony no. 9, 1987
- Symphonie Chez nous, symphony no. 10, 1990
- Sinfonia d'autunno, symphony no. 11, 1991
- Sinfonia da camera, symphony no. 12, 1992

==== Operas ====
- Petronella, "opera bluffa", 1942
- Tjuvens pekfinger, opera buffa, 1966
- Rivalerna, chamber opera, 1967
- Sagan om ringen, opera, 1972, never performed
- Reliken, opera, 1975
- Skandal, Ers majestät, opera, 1978
- Dinize, opera, 1993-94, never performed

==== Choral works ====
- Psaltare och lyra (Snabbt jagar stormen våra år), (text Erik Axel Karlfeldt), 1953
- Symfoni nr 2A (Duinoelegi nr 7, text Rainer Maria Rilke), 1954
- Fyra visor om årstiderna; Sommar-ro (Hedvig Charlotta Nordenflycht), Hösten (Jacob Wallenberg), Vintervisa (Anna Maria Lenngren), Vårvisa (Olof von Dalin), 1957
- Sånger i förvandlingens natt, symfoni nr 4 (text Östen Sjöstrand), 1958
- Fancies (text Shakespeare) för blandad kör och piano, 1974

=== Selected recordings ===
Title of Recording	Recorded works by Johanson	Performers	Record label	Release year
Det brinner en eld - Burning Bright	Choral works	Rilkeensemblen, Gunnar Eriksson conductor	Footprint Records	2010
Telling What is Told - Shakespeare Songs	Fancies	The Norwegian Soloists' Choir	Simax	2006
Tankarnas gröna träd	Det är något bortom bergen	Göteborgs Kammarkör, Harald Svensson piano, Gunnar Eriksson conductor	Footprint Record	2003
Sven-Eric Johanson	Fancies; Tvinnat Silke; Tio Epigram; Pianosonata No.2; Variationer över en Korsfararsång från 1100-talet; Sonata för Soloflöjt; Sinfonia da Camera - Symphony No.12	Skaraborg's Vocal Quartet, Lars Hägglund piano, Henrik Löwenmark piano, Wind Quartet Arion, Bo Nyberg flute, Western Sweden Music's Chamber Ensemble, Petter Sundkvist conductor	Proprius	1995
Sven-Eric Johanson - Chez nous	Symphony Chez Nous - Symphony No. 10; Trio For Clarinet, Cello And Piano; String Quartet No. 7	Gothenburg Symphony Orchestra, Petter Sundkvist conductor, Saga Quartet	Phono Suecia	1994
Viska du vind	Genesaret, Herde, Vit natt, Som sådden förnimmer	Göteborgs Kammarkör, Gunnar Eriksson conductor	Proprius	1994
Nalle Puh - Two Symphonic Tales	Nalle Puh - en symfonisk saga	Gothenburg Symphony Orchestra, Lars Benstorp conductor, Stefan Ljungqvist narrator	BIS	1992
Henrik Cervin orgel, Gustavi Domkyrka	Toccata	Henrik Cervin organ	Opus3	1983
Tubin: Balalaika Concerto	Sonatina for balalaika and piano	Nicolaus Zwetnow balalaika, Lucia Negro piano	Caprice Records	1981
Johanson på skiva	Choral works	Göteborgs Kammarkör, Gunnar Eriksson	Proprius	1973
Ung kyrkomusik	Agnus dei	Ungdomskör ur RKU och Sveriges Kyrkosångsförbund, Karl-Erik Welin organ, Torsten Nilsson conductor	His Master's Voice	1969
Kattresan / Vad säger läseboken?	Vad säger läseboken?	Göteborgs Kammarkör, Gunnar Eriksson	His Master's Voice	1968
