= Folke Bohlin =

Folke Bohlin is the name of:

- Folke Bohlin (musicologist) (born 1931), Swedish musicologist and choral conductor
- Folke Bohlin (sailor) (1903–1972), Swedish sailor
