= Alf Nilsson =

Swedish actor and artist (1930–2018)

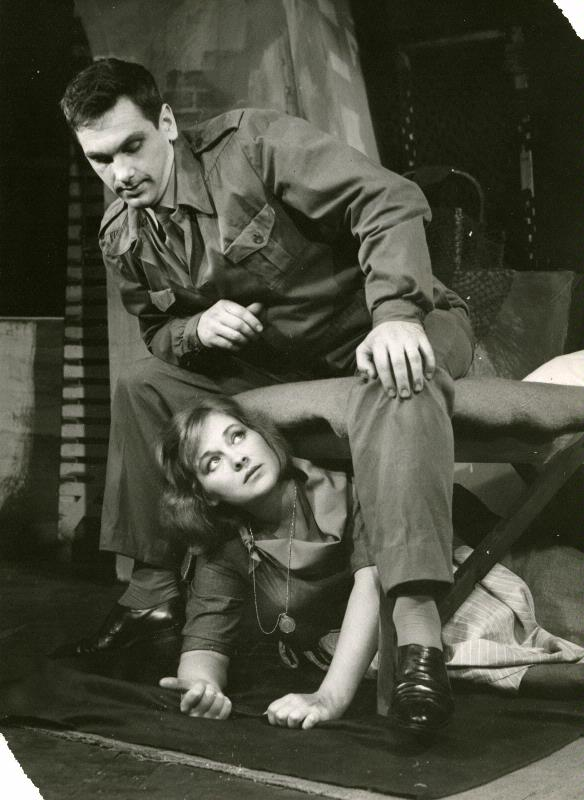
- Nilsson with Nadja Witzansky in Gisslan, 1961
- Born: Sven Alf Nilsson; 18 May 1930; Boden, Sweden
- Died: 19 December 2018 (aged 88); Rävlanda, Sweden
- Occupations: Actor; artist
- Years active: 1956–2012
- Children: 3

Sven Alf Nilsson (18 May 1930 – 19 December 2018) was a Swedish actor and artist.

== Early life and education ==
Nilsson grew up in Boden, where he had roles in local revues from an early age. He went through the drama school connected to the Gothenburg City Theatre in 1952 through 1954.

== Career ==
Throughout Nilsson's career as an actor, he primarily worked at the Gothenburg City Theatre, but also other theatres around the country including the Uppsala City Theatre and the Helsingborg City Theatre.

He made his film debut in Blånande hav (1956). While he was not a prolific film actor, he appeared in feature films such as The Hunters from 1996 and Dalecarlians from 2004, where he had minor roles that received positive acclaim.

As a television actor, he appeared in the long-running TV series Hem till byn, where he played the role of Harald Eriksson from 1973 to 2006. He played the police inspector Bo Kronborg, one of the main roles in the comedy-drama television series Polisen i Strömstad throughout the run of the series.

As an artist, he exhibited together with his brother Rolf and Eric Ståhl.

== Personal life ==
Nilsson had three children together with actor Ann-Christine Gry, who played Elsie Eriksson, wife of Alf Nilsson's character Harald, in Hem till Byn. Their eldest son Johan Gry is an actor, who works at the Gothenburg City Theatre.

== Filmography ==
=== Film ===
Year	Title	Role	Notes	Ref.
1956	Blånande hav	Plåtis		
1966	Adamsson i Sverige	Hoodlum		
1968	Badarna	Client at the Institution		
1996	The Hunters	Assessor		
1997	Vildängel	Vester		
1999	Lusten till ett liv	Arthur Mörner		
2004	Dalecarlians	Tore		
2012	Jävla pojkar	Elderly Man at Grave		
