= List of non-governmental organizations in Sweden =

Like most other countries, Sweden is home to a variety of non-governmental organizations (NGOs). Among those with international reach are the Nobel Foundation and the Olof Palme International Center.

== Business and industry ==
- Confederation of Swedish Enterprise (Svenskt Näringsliv)
- Swedish Confederation of Professional Associations (SACO)
- Swedish Confederation of Professional Employees (TCO)
  - Swedish Union of Clerical and Technical Employees in Industry (SIF)
- Swedish Trade Union Confederation (LO)
- Central Organisation of the Workers of Sweden (SAC)

== Defence ==
- Society and Defence (Folk och Försvar)

== Think tanks ==
- Timbro
- Agora
- Eudoxa

== Foundations ==
- Nobel Foundation (Nobelstiftelsen)

== Other ==
- Olof Palme International Center
- Piratbyrån
- SVEROK
- Swedish Federation of Young Musicians
- Tolkien Society of Sweden

== See also ==
- Government Agencies in Sweden
- Swedish Royal Academies
- List of political parties in Sweden
- List of Swedish companies
- List of Swedish government enterprises
