= Aniara (opera) =

Opera by Karl-Birger Blomdahl

- opera by Karl-Birger Blomdahl
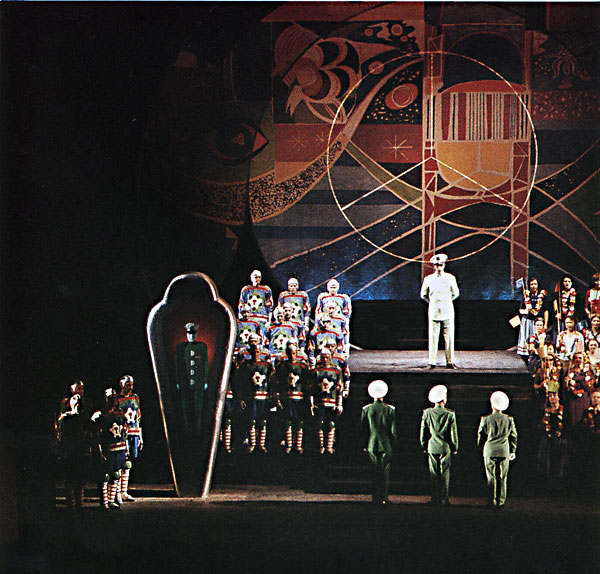
- Premiere production at the Royal Swedish Opera, May 1959. Set by Sven Erixson.
- Librettist: Erik Lindegren
- Language: Swedish
- Based on: Aniara by Harry Martinson
- Premiere: 31 May 1959; Royal Swedish Opera, Stockholm

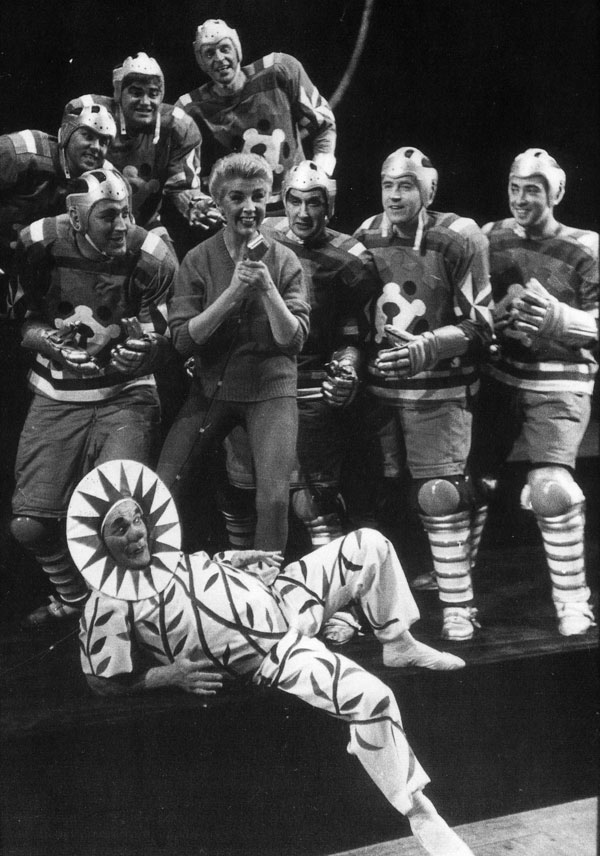
Kjerstin Dellert and Olle Sivall in the premiere production.

Aniara is an opera in two acts by Karl-Birger Blomdahl, with a libretto by Erik Lindegren based on the poem Aniara by Harry Martinson, that was premiered at the Royal Swedish Opera on 31 May 1959. The opera was described by the composer with the ambiguous phrase en revy om människan i tid och rum: "a revue about Man in Time and Space".

== Background and performance history ==
Many representatives of the international press were at the Royal Swedish Opera in Stockholm for the premiere in 1959 at a time when the space age was beginning. Blomdahl said in interview that the opera (in common with his next opera Herr von Hancken) was founded on "modern man's complexity and his basically impossible situation"; Aniara dealt with "the downfall of the group". The score of Aniara is varied and makes full use of a range of musical idioms, including jazz, serial writing and an electronic tape. The narrative is sung primarily by Mimaroben, a bass-baritone, who operates the electronic tape, Mima, the computer, and by the chorus. In essence the opera (and poem) deal with the relationship between the individual and the group through time. Erik Lindegren had seen a stage performance a few years before by the deaf-mute priest S. G. Svenfors and, deeply moved by its expressiveness, engaged Svenfors to teach Ulfung to perform the Deaf-Mute's 'song' in sign language, one of the dramatic high points of the opera.

The original Stockholm production by Göran Gentele was seen at the Edinburgh Festival in 1959 and at Covent Garden in 1960, the latter featuring Hallin, Elisabeth Söderström and conducted by Ehrling. In Hamburg in early 1960, "For about twenty minutes the usually cool-headed audience in the Staatsoper ran riot" at the end, mixing boos and bravos; conducted by Leopold Ludwig and featuring Joan Carroll, Helga Pilarczyk, Toni Blankenheim and Ratko Delorko this was a production by Günther Rennert. The opera was the first production of the new opera house in Gothenburg in 1994.

== Roles ==
Role	Voice type	Premiere Cast, 31 May 1959 (Conductor: Sixten Ehrling)
Mimaroben	baritone	Erik Saedén
The blind poetess	high soprano	Margareta Hallin
Daisi Doody	soprano	Kjerstin Dellert
Libidel	dancer	
Three chief technicians	2 tenors, baritone	Sven-Erik Wikström, Arne Ohlson, Bo Lundborg
Comedian, Sandon	high buffo tenor	Olle Sivall
Isagel	dancer	Loulou Portefaix
The Deaf Mute	tenor	Ragnar Ulfung
Chefone	bass-baritone	Arne Tyrén
Chorus: space cadets, passengers

== Synopsis ==
Controlled by the computer Mima, the space ship Aniara leaves the poisoned Earth, heading for Mars. Through Mimaroben, who is the operator of Mima, the emigrants learn of the evil of mankind.

During the celebration of midsummer, the vessel is thrown off course, causing panic, and forcing a journey to the constellation Lyra which commander Chefone says will last for the rest of the lives of the crew and passengers. When the Earth is destroyed, Mima cannot continue, and Sandon makes jokes about the safety on board, but when the mute describes in signs the end of the world he becomes silent. Chefone blames Mimaroben, who, with the pilot Isagel, is taken away.

The commander deals as best he can with the increased despair and moral deterioration among those aboard, depicted in a scene in a hall of mirrors, where Daisy Dodd, her lesbian partner, and the passengers dance, and the blind poetess speaks of her cult of Light, which has replaced Mima. The body of the dead chief technician is shot into outer space in the direction of the star Rigel. The 20th anniversary of the voyage is celebrated, and the blind poetess ecstatically sees the city of heaven, but is taken away.

The final scene shows the last night onboard where Isagel dances and the blind poetess sings of the joy of death. A light beam sweeps over the dead passengers and Mimaroben prepares for the end. Finally darkness descends over the occupants of the space ship, and the audience in the theatre.

== Recordings ==
The first recording was released in 1960 by Columbia Masterworks (catalog number – M2S 902) featuring Werner Janssen conducting members of Royal Swedish Opera. The first broadcast performance was broadcast by Swedish Radio; a subsequent recording in 1985 with the Swedish Radio Symphony Orchestra was conducted by Stig Westerberg, and included Viveka Anderberg, Björn Haugan, Stefan Parkman, Mikael Samuelson, Thomas Sunnegårdh and Jerker Arvidssonin among the cast (Caprice CAP 22016: 1–2) (CD).
