= Come and Blow the Horn =

1978 film

Fäbodjäntan
- Directed by: Lawrence Henning
- Screenplay by: Lawrence Henning
- Produced by: Sture Sjöstedt
- Starring: Marie Bergman; Knud Jörgensen
- Cinematography: Torbjörn Lindqvist
- Production companies: Gebe Film; Joe Sarno Productions; Saga Film
- Release date: 25 September 1978 (Sweden)
- Running time: 114 minutes
- Country: Sweden
- Language: Swedish

Come and Blow the Horn (Swedish: Fäbodjäntan, approximately The herding lass, from Swedish fä = "animal", bod = "hut", jäntan = "the girl") is a 1978 Swedish pornographic fantasy comedy film directed by Joseph W. Sarno, using the pseudonym Lawrence Henning, and produced by Sture Sjöstedt. The film is set in rural Dalarna. It was shot in Skattungbyn outside of Orsa, and was first screened in Orsa in September 1978, and later had its Swedish premiere in the pornographic theater Fenix in Stockholm on 25 September 1978.

The film has gained notoriety in Sweden, particularly the horn blowing sequence and the masturbation scene where an actress uses a sizable sausage (falukorv) as a dildo. The film's soundtrack includes the traditional gånglåt "Äppelbo gånglåt".

== Plot ==
The film takes place in rural Dalarna. A legend surrounds an old horn, stating that this instrument was brought along by the vikings from their travels: When they would blow the horn, the village women would gather at the beach to meet their men and make love. Farm girl Monika blows the horn and finds that it indeed causes the local women to get sexually aroused.

== Cast ==
- Leena Hiltunen – Monika Skoglund
- Anita Berglund – Britt Kindberg
- Marie Bergman – Agneta Johansson
- Knud Jörgensen – Olle Hansson

== International titles ==
- Come and Blow the Horn (UK)
- Come and Blow the Horn (US)
- Hot Swedish Summer (English version)
- Waldhorn (West Germany)

== Reception ==
Marie Claire lists the film, ranking number 13, among a choice of 53 pornographic iconic classics, the magazine finding it has a "delightfully whimsical premise."
