= Uppsala Cathedral Boys Choir =

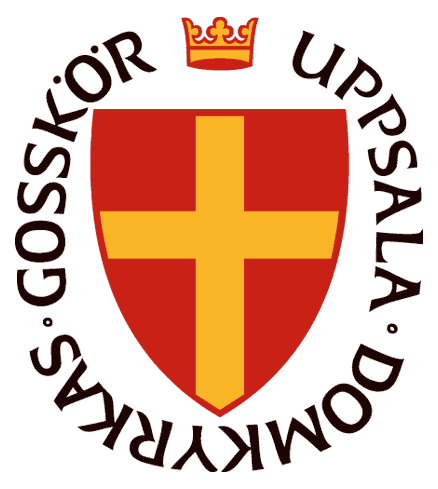

Background information
- Origin: Uppsala, Sweden
- Genres: various
- Years active: 1920

The Uppsala Cathedral Boys Choir (Swedish: Uppsala Domkyrkas Gosskör) is the oldest boys' choir in Sweden, formed in 1920 by Nathan Söderblom.

== History ==
As Church of Sweden Archbishop, Nathan Söderblom, had heard boys' choirs in Germany and England and decided to institute a similar choir at Uppsala Cathedral.

In 1927, the composer Otto Olsson dedicated his choral work Jesu Corona Celsior to the choir and its leader, Fredrik Mellander. In the late 1960s, King Gustav VI Adolf became Protector of the choir.

Today, the Uppsala Cathedral Boys Choir has approximately 100 members between the ages of 8 and 28, 50 of whom are members of the main concert choir. The choir has made a number of tours in Europe, as well as a tour in the United States in 2010.

== Conductors ==
- Fredrik Mellander 1920–1946
- Birger Oldermark 1946–1967
- Folke Bohlin 1967–1968
- Jan Åke Hillerud 1968–1976
- Stefan Parkman 1976–1988
- John-Erik Eleby 1988–1989
- Erik Hellerstedt 1989–1990
- David Anstey 1990–1994
- Bengt Isaksson 1994
- John Wilund 1995–1996
- Andrew Canning 1996–2003
- Margareta Raab 2003–
