= Polisen i Strömstad =

- Genre: Drama; Thriller; Comedy
- Created by: Arne Lifmark
- Based on: Polisen i Strömstad by Gösta Unefäldt
- Starring: Per Oscarsson; Stefan Ljungqvist; Evert Lindkvist; Alf Nilsson; Irma Erixson; Per Elam; Anders Janson; Sonny Johnson
- Composers: Curt-Eric Holmquist; Stefan Abelson; Anders Blad; Ingmar Nilsson; Bo Stenholm
- Country of origin: Sweden
- Original language: Swedish
- No. of seasons: 5
- No. of episodes: 21 (list of episodes)

Production
- Running time: 45–60 minutes
- Production company: SVT

Original release
- Network: SVT
- Release: 21 January 1982 – 26 April 1996

Polisen i Strömstad (English: The police in Strömstad) is a Swedish drama comedy television series. It premiered on 21 January 1982 on SVT, and was filmed as five miniseries between 1982 and 1996. The series is based on Gösta Unefäldt's crime novels and was directed by Arne Lifmark. The series diverged from the books. Stefan Ljungqvist's character Evald Larsson died in first of Unefäldt's novels, but survived in the TV series and became a very popular audience favourite.

It was watched by millions of viewers when it was first broadcast on TV. The series also received praise from the police force for its credibility, because the series reflected the everyday life of the police in a good way.

== Cast and characters ==
Name	Portrayed by	Title	Seasons				
Name	Portrayed by	Title	1	2	3	4	5
Evald Larsson	Stefan Ljungqvist	Police officer	Main				
Nils Gryt	Evert Lindkvist	Inspector	Main				
Bo Kronborg	Alf Nilsson	Inspector	Main				
Gustav Jörgensson	Per Oscarsson	Chief of Police	Main				
Grahn	Sonny Johnson	Police officer	Main				
Lisa Mattsson	Irma Erixson		Main				

== Episodes ==
Series	Episodes	Originally released		
Series	Episodes	First released	Last released	Network
1	4	21 January 1982	11 February 1982	SVT1
2	4	31 March 1984	21 April 1984	SVT1
3	4	26 October 1988	16 November 1988	SVT2
4	4	10 March 1993	31 March 1993	SVT2
5	5	29 March 1996	26 April 1996	SVT2
