= Drottningholm Music =

The Drottningholm Music (Swedish: Drottningholmsmusiken or Bilägers Musiquen) is the popular name of the music that was composed by Johan Helmich Roman. Composed for the wedding of Prince Adolf Frederick and Princess Louisa Ulrika of Prussia in August 18th of 1744, the work spans 24 movements of various lengths.

The work reflects the Swedish interpretation of the galant style, popularized during the Baroque period, affirmed by Roman's inspiration from other event-oriented works like George Frideric Handel's Water Music (1718) and Georg Philipp Telemann's Water Music (1723).

The premiere was under Roman's guidance, and were used for various aspects during the wedding' s four-day duration. The manuscript is kept in two locations, the first being the Alströmer Collection of the Stockholm Music and Theatre Library, the second being within the Kraus collection of the Lund University Library. The work is categorized as BeRI 2 within Swedish musicologist Ingmar Bengtsson's system.

== Movements ==
In total, the work has a total of 24 movements, often ranging in length and key. Although beginning and ending in D major, it often uses G minor and G major (subdominant), D minor (parallel minor), and A minor (dominant).

1. Allegro assai
2. Allegretto
3. Andante
4. Allegro non troppo
5. Andante
6. Poco allegro
7. Allegro
8. Lento
9. Allegro
10. Allegro assai
11. Allegro
12. Presto
13. Minuet
14. Trio
15. Grave
16. Presto
17. Lento
18. Andante
19. Allegro molto
20. Allegro
21. Allegro
22. Allegro
23. Vivace
24. Allegro

== Links ==
- IMSLP
