= Folk och Försvar =

Swedish non-governmental organization

Folk och Försvar (translated roughly as “Society and Defence” or "People and Defence") is a Swedish non-governmental organisation which since 1946 acts as a forum for debate over defence and national security issues in Sweden. It has other organisations rather than individuals as its members. The membership, of about 50, includes youth leagues of political parties, trade unions, business associations, royal academies, voluntary defence organisations and others.

== See also ==
- Swedish Armed Forces
- Swedish Emergency Management Agency
- Swedish National Board of Psychological Defence
- Government of Sweden
- Royal Swedish Academy of War Sciences
- Royal Swedish Society of Naval Sciences
- Non-governmental organisations in Sweden
- List of political parties in Sweden
- Scandinavian defence union
