= Sture Sjöstedt =

- Born: Nils Sture Sjöstedt; 8 May 1916; Stockholm, Stockholms Iän, Sweden
- Died: 5 July 2008 (aged 92)
- Other name: Sture N. Sjostedt
- Occupations: Actor; Producer; Distributor; Cinematographer
- Years active: 1955–1985

Nils Sture Sjöstedt (8 May 1916 – 5 July 2008) was an actor, producer, distributor and cinematographer. He has acted in films directed by Charles Kaufman and produced films directed by Joseph W. Sarno.

== Career ==
Sjöstedt was during his movie career, such a film director at the Stockholm film and film director at Minerva Film, where he among other things, for a time produced and did the research for the important documentaries of the bloody time insanity of war and war criminals. But above all he ran his own production and distribution company, Saga Film. It was acting as a film producer, he became the man who gave the sausage an entirely new use. He himself used to joke and say that on his tombstone would read "here lies the man who made sausage film".

Sjöstedt began his film career in 1955 but his first film as a producer/exclusive producer was Den Pornografiska Jungfrun (The Devil's Plaything). Some of his other Production, distribution and cinematography credits include: Vild på Sex (Confessions of a Sex Kitten), Nøglehullet (The Keyhole), Butterflies and Fäbodjäntan (Girl Mountain) - which is probably Sweden's best known and seen porn film of all time.

His only acting credits are Mother's Day and When Nature Calls. both films from Troma.

== Filmography ==
Year	Title	Notes
1955	Tigrolovy	(Distributor)
1966	Dyden går Amok	(Cinematographer) other title - Dyden goes Amok
1973	Den Pornografiska Jungfrun	(Exclusive Producer & Cinematographer) other titles - Der Fluch der Schwarzen Schwestern, The Devil's Plaything, Veil of Blood, The Curse of the Black Sisters, Vampire Ecstasy, The Porn Maid, Meeting with the Devil
1974	Vild På Sex	(Exclusive Producer & Cinematographer) other titles - Wild at Six, Confessions of a Sex Kitten, Baby Love, Bibi: Confessions of Sweet Sixteen, Girl Meets Girl
1974	Nøglehullet	(Producer & Cinematographer)other title - The Keyhole
1975	Butterflies	(Exclusive Producer) other titles - Broken Butterfly, Butterfly, Baby Tramp
1976	I Iust och Nöd	(Producer & Cinematographer) other title - In Joy and Sorrow
1977	Monas Hemliga Sexdrömmar	(Distributor & Cinematographer)
1977	Das Geile Mädchenpensionat	(Producer & Distributor)
1977	Kärleksön	(Producer)
1978	Fäbodjäntan	(Producer) other title - Girl Mountain, Chalet Girl
1978	Dépucelages	(Distributor)
1978	The Fur Trap	(Distributor)
1978	Here Comes the Bride	(Distributor)
1978	Les Petites Filles	(Distributor)
1979	Auto-Stoppeuses en Chaleur	(Distributor) other title - Other-Stop Uses a Chaleur
1979	Bad Penny	(Distributor)
1979	Les Chattes	(Distributor) other title - Les Chats
1979	Parties Chaudes	(Distributor)
1980	Les Petites Écolières	(Distributor)
1980	Sesso Profondo	(Distributor) other title - Sesso Prof Evil
1980	Sizzle Pants	(Distributor)
1980	Mother's Day	(Actor)
1981	Die Tochter Treibt's Wieder	(Distributor) other title - Sexabitur II. Die Wieder Treibt's
1981	Sommersünden	(Distributor)
1982	Dames de Compagnie	(Distributor) other title - Dames the Compagnie
1983	Imtimes Lustgeflüster	(Distributor) other title - Intime Lustgeflüster
1983	Strangers in Love	(Distributor)
1985	When Nature Calls	(Actor) (credited as Sture N. Sjostedt)
198?	Die Nackten und die Reichen	(Distributor) other title - Die Neck und die Reich
