= List of Polisen i Strömstad episodes =

Polisen i Strömstad is a Swedish drama comedy television series which premiered on SVT on 21 January 1982.

== Series overview ==
Series	Episodes	Originally released		
Series	Episodes	First released	Last released	Network
1	4	21 January 1982	11 February 1982	SVT1
2	4	31 March 1984	21 April 1984	SVT1
3	4	26 October 1988	16 November 1988	SVT2
4	4	10 March 1993	31 March 1993	SVT2
5	5	29 March 1996	26 April 1996	SVT2

== Episodes ==
=== Polisen som vägrade svara (1982) ===
No. overall	No. in season	Title	Directed by	Written by	Original release date
1	1	"Del 1"	Arne Lifmark	Gösta Unefäldt & Arne Lifmark	21 January 1982
2	2	"Del 2"	Arne Lifmark	Gösta Unefäldt & Arne Lifmark	28 January 1982
3	3	"Del 3"	Arne Lifmark	Gösta Unefäldt & Arne Lifmark	4 February 1982
4	4	"Del 4"	Arne Lifmark	Gösta Unefäldt & Arne Lifmark	11 February 1982

=== Polisen som vägrade ge upp (1984) ===
No. overall	No. in season	Title	Directed by	Written by	Original release date
5	1	"Del 1"	Arne Lifmark	Gösta Unefäldt & Arne Lifmark	31 March 1984
6	2	"Del 2"	Arne Lifmark	Gösta Unefäldt & Arne Lifmark	7 April 1984
7	3	"Del 3"	Arne Lifmark	Gösta Unefäldt & Arne Lifmark	14 April 1984
8	4	"Del 4"	Arne Lifmark	Gösta Unefäldt & Arne Lifmark	21 April 1984

=== Polisen som vägrade ta semester (1988) ===
No. overall	No. in season	Title	Directed by	Written by	Original release date
9	1	"Del 1"	Arne Lifmark	Gösta Unefäldt & Arne Lifmark	26 October 1988
10	2	"Del 2"	Arne Lifmark	Gösta Unefäldt & Arne Lifmark	2 November 1988
11	3	"Del 3"	Arne Lifmark	Gösta Unefäldt & Arne Lifmark	9 November 1988
12	4	"Del 4"	Arne Lifmark	Gösta Unefäldt & Arne Lifmark	16 November 1988

=== Polisen och domarmordet (1993) ===
No. overall	No. in season	Title	Directed by	Written by	Original release date
13	1	"Del 1"	Arne Lifmark	Gösta Unefäldt & Arne Lifmark	10 March 1993
14	2	"Del 2"	Arne Lifmark	Gösta Unefäldt & Arne Lifmark	17 March 1993
15	3	"Del 3"	Arne Lifmark	Gösta Unefäldt & Arne Lifmark	24 March 1993
16	4	"Del 4"	Arne Lifmark	Gösta Unefäldt & Arne Lifmark	31 March 1993

=== Polisen och pyromanen (1996) ===
No. overall	No. in season	Title	Directed by	Written by	Original release date
17	1	"Del 1"	Arne Lifmark	Gösta Unefäldt & Arne Lifmark	29 March 1996
18	2	"Del 2"	Arne Lifmark	Gösta Unefäldt & Arne Lifmark	5 April 1996
19	3	"Del 3"	Arne Lifmark	Gösta Unefäldt & Arne Lifmark	12 April 1996
20	4	"Del 4"	Arne Lifmark	Gösta Unefäldt & Arne Lifmark	19 April 1996
21	5	"Del 5"	Arne Lifmark	Gösta Unefäldt & Arne Lifmark	26 April 1996
