= Ingvar Lidholm =

Swedish composer (1921–2017)

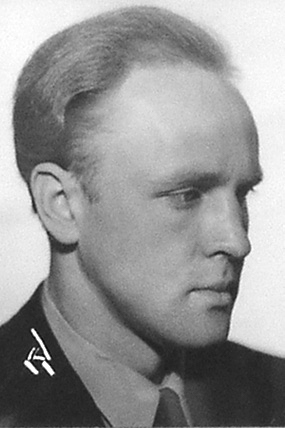
Ingvar Lidholm circa 1945.

Ingvar Natanael Lidholm (24 February 1921 – 17 October 2017) was a Swedish composer.

== Early years: 1921–1940 ==
Ingvar Lidholm was born in Jönköping. The actual family home was in Nässjö, some 40 kilometers to the southeast. Neither of his parents was particularly musical: his father worked for Swedish Railways and his mother was a homemaker. But the home environment was one in which music was encouraged. Ingvar was the youngest of four children, all of whom made music at home. The family owned a piano, and Lidholm began his "musical explorations" at an early age. By the age of eleven, Lidholm and his family had moved to Södertälje, which lies to the south of Stockholm. Both at school and at home, he rapidly began to develop his musical skills as a performer – and as a composer. By age twelve, he was writing songs in a tonal and romantic idiom, which led gradually to exercises of larger proportions, including music for full orchestra. This early period also included orchestration studies with Natanael Berg in Stockholm.

Lidholm's primary performance area was stringed instruments; he eventually studied and mastered all four instruments of the string family. As a gymnasium student, he played viola and contrabass in the school orchestra, and studied violin from the German master Hermann Gramss. He remained active in composition throughout his school years and completed what may be considered his final student work early in 1940: the Elegisk svit (“Elegiac Suite”) for string quartet. Several songs he wrote later that summer (including För vilsna fötter sjunger gräset) were to become his earliest published pieces.

In 1940, Lidholm completed his studies at the gymnasium and passed the Studentexamen, the standard prerequisite test for higher education in Sweden.

== University: 1940–1947 ==
With the fall of 1940, Lidholm began his advanced musical studies at the Musikhögskolan in Stockholm. There, he established friendships with two other students at the conservatory who were to become important composers in their own right: Sven-Erik Bäck and Karl-Birger Blomdahl. Over the following decades, these three men were to hold similar, and influential, posts at Swedish Radio (the state broadcasting organization) and the Musikhögskola. They, in turn, were to affect the growth and education of many younger Swedish composers and musicians.

As students with common interests, Lidhom, Bäck and Blomdahl began to meet together, eventually more regularly, and it came about that their gatherings fell on Mondays. Additional students, and then instructors, began to drop in; they held critiques and discussions of music, as well as performances of contemporary works. Hilding Rosenberg, who was to be Lidholm's composition teacher for two years, was especially important in leading studies into Hindemith, Stravinsky and other modern composers. Thus evolved what was later to be called the Måndagsgrupp. Under Rosenberg, Lidholm began to achieve a higher compositional output than previously, including: incidental music to a play of Georg Büchner, Leonce och Lena, from which the song Rosettas visa was published separately; Madonnas vaggvisa (“The Madonna’s Cradle Song”) for voice and piano; and På kungens slott (“At the King’s Castle”), a collection of children's piano pieces. A further teaching piece for piano, Allegro-Koral-Risoluto, followed the next year.

The early part of summer of 1944, he completed Toccata e Canto for a chamber orchestra of strings and solo winds. With its debut, this work of the twenty-one-year-old composer attracted immediate interest within Swedish music circles. The following year, he wrote the Concerto for string orchestra, and in 1946 a Sonata for solo flute.

Lidholm spent the academic year 1946/47 abroad as the recipient of a governmental Jenny Lind scholarship, during which he broadened his artistic experiences, meeting people, discussing ideas, and planning compositions. While in Bergen, Norway, he wrote the Sonata for piano, dedicated to musicologist and pianist Ingmar Bengtsson.

He auditioned and was accepted for the position of musical director of the Örebro Orchestral Society in 1947, a position he held until 1956. (His work Mutanza was written in 1959 for the society.)

== New compositional directions: 1947–1956 ==
During 1947/48, Ingvar Lidholm completed a number of new works: the piano pieces Sonatin (“Sonatina”), (10) Miniatyrer (“Ten Miniatures”), and Lätta pianostycken (“Easy Piano Pieces”). An important work of this period was Laudi for a cappella mixed choir, published in 1948. This piece was a clear departure from traditional Swedish choral works. The conductor Eric Ericson had this to say about the impact of Laudi: I remember so well our first contact with Lidholm’s Laudi – how depressed we were after the first rehearsal. We understood nothing! The piece appeared like a high wall! But we struggled through and in that way taught ourselves not just Laudi but many other pieces.... What had been very difficult gradually became natural. Laudi was the first of Lidholm's works to be performed at a convocation of the International Society for Contemporary Music (ISCM), at Brussels in 1950.

In 1949, he attended seminars on music held at the Darmstädter Ferienkurse in Germany (including lectures by Leibowitz on twelve-tone technique, and talks by Messiaen and Fortner). Shortly after returning from Darmstadt, Lidholm wrote a brief piano work, Klavierstück 1949. It is not directly inspired by Arnold Schoenberg's similarly titled piano piece, but Lidholm was familiar with it. Fyra körer (“Four choruses”) from 1953 also uses a free application of twelve-tone technique.

In late 1953, Lidholm pursued further compositional studies with Mátyás Seiber in London for several months. Work from this period includes the Invention for various instrumental combinations and Concertino, a 13-minute chamber work he wrote upon the commission of the Guildhall Music Society. During his time in London, Lidholm made contact with Messiaen and Luigi Dallapiccola. Within a year after his return to Sweden, Lidholm had completed a suite for cello and piano that pays tribute to Dallapiccola, and Lidholm produced his first large-scale orchestral work, Ritornell, in 1955, the piece with which he became internationally known. Lidholm remarked “After some years of mainly working with chamber music, I desired to test my abilities in a work for larger ensemble.” It made use of large cluster chords and protracted use of percussion.

In the ensuing years, Lidholm's works were performed in different cities, especially within Sweden and Germany.

Lidholm, in his prefatory remarks on his compositional style in Ritornell, quoted Igor Stravinsky's definition of music as “…a spirit’s free investigation.” He composed in a number of styles of the course of his career, but never keyed his music to a methodology within any one of those styles. Thus, there is not the systematization of Hindemith in his works from the forties, or a strict serial technique in his works of the fifties. Only a small percentage of Lidholm's serial music subscribes to strict pitch order throughout the work. In Ritornell, for example, extraneous pitches are freely integrated into row order, and there is no deliberate effort to maintain an atonal orientation.

== International recognition: 1956–1960 ==
In 1956, Lidholm left his conducting post in Örebro to assume the head of the Chamber Music Department at Swedish Radio. He was instrumental in establishing the periodical Nutida musik (“Contemporary Music”) as an adjunct to the music series of the same name begun in 1957 by Swedish Radio. It was at this time that he came into contact with electronic music. In the fall of 1957, he made a visit to the Studio di Fonologia Musicale in Milan, and by 1959 he had produced his first electronic composition, as an accompaniment to his ballet, Riter; its electronic tape segments were somewhat akin to Blomdahl's opera Aniara of the same year. The tapes served to augment and accompany the orchestral forces. Riter was written for Birgit Åkesson (who also choreographed Bäck's A Game Around a Game in 1959). Later, he aided in establishing an independent electronic music laboratory for the Musikhögskola.

Skaldens natt (The Poet's Night) from 1957 was not a commissioned work, receiving its premier in Hamburg in 1959 as part of the West German new music series, Das neue Werk. The piece won first prize in the ISCM international composition competition at Rome.

He contributed a good deal toward an original and important a cappella choir literature during the second half of the 1950s. The first of these works was Canto LXXXI in 1956, whose text is an excerpt of the canto of the same name by Ezra Pound. The twelve-tone series used for Canto LXXXI was later used in a series of other choral works from 1959 to form an A cappella-bok (A Cappella Book) collection.

The first part of 1960 was devoted to the composition of Motus-colores for orchestra, commissioned by the Südwestfunk Orchestra of Baden-Baden, for large chamber orchestra with dominating percussion. The pitch content was organized serially, but with just nine, not twelve, pitches to the row, plus the inversion of that row. Following Motus-colores, Lidholm did not produce any compositions for the next two years.

== Moving away from serial music: 1963 and beyond ==
A distinctly new era begins in 1963, when Lidholm abandoned serial principles of pitch organization in his two works from that year: Nausikaa ensam (“Nausicaa Alone”) and Poesis. In writing Nausikaa, Lidholm had to take into consideration of the performance abilities of the commissioning body, the orchestra of the music high school of Ingesund, Sweden. Poesis, on the other hand, was commissioned for the fiftieth anniversary of the Stockholm Philharmonic Orchestra. Lidholm's inaugural lecture at the Musikhogskola describes the process of writing Poesis. One of the distinguishing characteristics of Poesis is its graphic notation, due to Lidholm's abandonment of even loose pitch serialization. In keeping with the works of other composers who introduce new graphical notations, there are several pages of explanatory notes as a preface to the score. This was Lidholm's first composition with newer-style notation, but certainly not his last: In 1971, he composed Stamp music. This celebrated a stamp issue which honored the 200th anniversary of the Royal Swedish Academy of Music.

In 1964, Lidholm decided to leave his post at Swedish Radio and succeed Karl-Birger Blomdahl as professor of composition (a ten-year, non-renewable appointment) at the Musikhogskola. Due to his teaching duties, he produced just four works for the period 1965–1975. He began exploring the challenges of a medium for which he had not yet written, opera. Together with his librettist, Herbert Grevenius, he settled on reworking an unfinished drama of August Strindberg, Holländarn (“The Dutchman”). This was a joint commission from Swedish Radio-RV and West German Television, which meant that the opera was to be not for the stage, but for television, the first such work by a Scandinavian composer. Premiered in December, 1967, it captured the opera prizes of Florence and Salzburg in 1968.

In 1973, he completed a commission from the governmental arts board of Sweden, Rikskonserter, for an a cappella choral work, …a riveder le stelle, in which rhythm is subordinated to allow for maximal exposure of the harmony and melody, using whole-tone and pentatonic as well as diatonic pitch organization. Its serenity stands in contrast to the work that followed it, Greetings from an old world, commissioned by the Clarion Music Society of New York City in 1976. The “old world” of the title is brought into play through the use of Heinrich Isaac's tune, Innsbruck, Ich muss dich lassen. The overall effect of this stylistic mixture is reminiscent of Charles Ives, and other Scandinavian composers such as Lars Johan Werle and Lars Edlund who have utilized tonal and atonal styles within the same piece.

In 1978, Lidholm completed a commission for another choral work, Perserna (“The Persians”), adapted from Aeschylus’ play of the same name, and set for a cappella male choir and three soloists. This was followed the same year by Kontakion, in which he uses Russian Orthodox choral music, again as with Greetings from an old world bridging early music and the avant-garde. His second opera, Ett drömspel (1992) is based on Strindberg's "A Dream Play".

In 1993, Ingvar Lidholm won the Rolf Schock Prize. He played the violin and viola, conducted and served on musical juries. His notable students include Edward Applebaum and Anders Eliasson. See: List of music students by teacher: K to M#Ingvar Lidholm.

Lidholm established a reputation as a composer of demanding (but well-respected) choral music during his early career, and he continued to compose vocal music throughout his career, and especially during his later years. Of the final nine works that he composed after the age of 70, six included choir or solo voice.

== Selected compositions ==
- På kungens slott for piano (1943)
- Toccata e Canto for chamber orchestra (1944)
- Concerto for string orchestra (1945)
- Sonata for solo flute (1946)
- Sonata for piano (1947)
- Sonatin for piano (1947)
- Laudi for mixed choir a cappella (1947)
- (10) minatyrer for piano (1948)
- Lätta pianostycken for piano (1948)
- Klavierstück for piano (1949)
- Sonatin for piano (1950)
- Musik för stråkar for string orchestra (1952)
- (4) körer for mixed choir a cappella (1953)
- Liten stråktrio for violin, viola and cello (1953)
- Concertino for flute, oboe, English horn, and cello (1954)
- Invention for two instruments or keyboard (1954)
- (4) Pezzi for cello and piano (1955)
- Ritornell for orchestra (1955)
- Canto LXXXI for mixed choir a cappella (1956)
- Skaldens natt for soprano, choir and orchestra (1957/81)
- Notturno-Canto (1958/2000)
- Mutanza for orchestra (1959/65)
- Motto for mixed choir a cappella (1959)
- (3) Strindbergsvisor for mixed choir a cappella (1959)
- Riter (Rites), ballet: for dancers, orchestra and electronic tape (1959)
- Motus-colores for orchestra (1960)
- Nausikaa ensam for soprano, chorus and orchestra (1963)
- Poesis for orchestra (1963)
- Holländarn (The Dutchman), opera for television, with electronic tape (1967)
- Stamp Music graphic composition for postage stamp (1971)
- Stamp Music I. realization of Stamp Music for soprano and tam-tam (1971)
- ...a riveder le stelle for mixed chorus a cappella (1971–73)
- Inga träd skall väcka digfor television, with solo soprano, mixed choir, string quartet, and electronic and concrete sounds (1973–74)
- Greetings from an Old World for orchestra (1974–76)
- Fantasia sopra 'Laudi' for solo cello (1977)
- Kontakion for orchestra (1978)
- Perserna (The Persians) for male choir, solo baritone, solo tenor, and speaker (1978)
- Amicizia for solo clarinet (1980)
- De Profundis for mixed choir a cappella (1983)
- Pastoral i skogen (Pastorale in the Forest) for flute, organ, and vibrafone (1988)
- Arabesque for soprano sax or oboe (1988)
- Ett drömspel (A Dream Play), opera for soloists, children's choir, mixed choir, and orchestra (1990)
- Inbillningens värld (The World of Imagination) for male choir (1990)
- Libera me requiem for mixed choir (1994)
- stund, när ditt inre for baritone and orchestra (1998)
- Aulos for oboe and English horn (2001)
- Grekisk gravrelief for mixed choir (2003)
