= Johan Helmich Roman =

Swedish Baroque composer

Johan Helmich Roman (26 October 1694 – 20 November 1758) was a Swedish Baroque composer. He has been called "the father of Swedish music" or "the Swedish Handel". He was the leader of the Swedish Royal Orchestra during the first decades of Sweden's Age of Liberty.

== Life ==
Roman was born in Stockholm into the family of Johan Roman, a member of the Swedish royal chapel. The boy probably received his first music lessons from his father. He joined the royal chapel in 1711 as a violinist and oboist. Around 1715, King Charles XII of Sweden granted him permission to study abroad, and the young composer spent some six years in London. He almost certainly studied under Johann Christoph Pepusch, met Francesco Geminiani, Giovanni Bononcini, and, most importantly, George Frideric Handel, whose music made a lasting impression on Roman.

Roman returned to Sweden in 1721. He was soon appointed deputy master of the royal chapel, and six years later he became Chief Master of the Swedish Royal Orchestra. Roman's life during the 1720s was full of organisational activity which led to much improved standards at the chapel, and, in 1731, the first public concerts in Sweden. Roman's only work published during his lifetime, a collection of 12 sonatas for flute, violone and harpsichord, appeared in 1727. In 1730 Roman married, but his wife died just four years later. In 1734, the composer left Sweden to visit several European countries—Austria, England, France, Germany, and Italy. He returned to Stockholm in 1737, bringing back a wealth of music by various composers for the royal chapel to perform. In 1738, Roman married again. In 1740 he was elected a member of the newly established Royal Academy of Sciences.

Roman's successful career took a turn for the worse in the early 1740s. The composer's greatest patron, Queen Ulrika Eleonora of Sweden, died in late 1741. In 1742, Roman's activity was greatly hindered by health problems. In 1744, Roman composed one of his finest works, Drottningholmsmusique: a large orchestral suite for the wedding of the Crown Prince Adolf Frederick of Sweden and Louisa Ulrika of Prussia. Ironically, it was due to Adolf Frederick's and Louisa Ulrika's efforts that Roman's career suffered. The new crown princess had different tastes in music, and her husband set up a very strong competing chapel. Finally, Roman's second wife Maria Elisabeth Baumgardt died in 1744, leaving the composer with five children.

In 1745, Roman retired from his post as leader of the royal chapel due to deafness, which had progressed rapidly during the previous years. He settled in the parish of Ryssby, on the estate Lilla Haraldsmåla, near the city of Kalmar in south-east Sweden. Apart from a single visit to Stockholm in 1751–52 to direct the funeral and coronation music on the accession of Adolf Frederick, Roman's last years were dedicated to translating European theoretical treatises into Swedish, and adapting sacred texts into the Swedish language. He died at Haraldsmåla in 1758. His work has never been forgotten, for already nine years after his death the Royal Academy of Sciences held a commemorative ceremony, where Roman's achievements were documented; copies of Roman's works are found in manuscripts from as late as 1810.

== Music ==
One of Roman's best-known compositions is the "Drottningholm Music", or "Music for a Royal Wedding". It consists of a collection of 24 short pieces ranging in length from about one to six minutes. Roman wrote this music for the wedding in August 1744 of the Crown Prince Adolf Frederick of Sweden and his bride Louisa Ulrika of Prussia. Their wedding took place at the palace of Drottningholm (hence the modern title). The festivities lasted four days. The pieces of the "Drottningholm Music" were apparently selected and arranged as befitted the occasion. Roman also kept eight pieces in reserve. These pieces are known as the Suite in D major, sometimes referred to as the Little Drottningholm Music, or Shorter Drottningholm Music. Both are modern terms invented by Swedish conductor and musician Claude Génetay.

Other pieces written by Roman include the suite of "Sjukmans Musiquen" and the Italian-inspired cantata Piante amiche. In manuscript, there remain a Mass, motets, more than 80 psalms, 21 symphonies, 6 overtures, more than 20 violin sonatas, twelve harpsichord sonatas, and various other works.
