= Stefan Parkman =

Swedish conductor (born 1952)

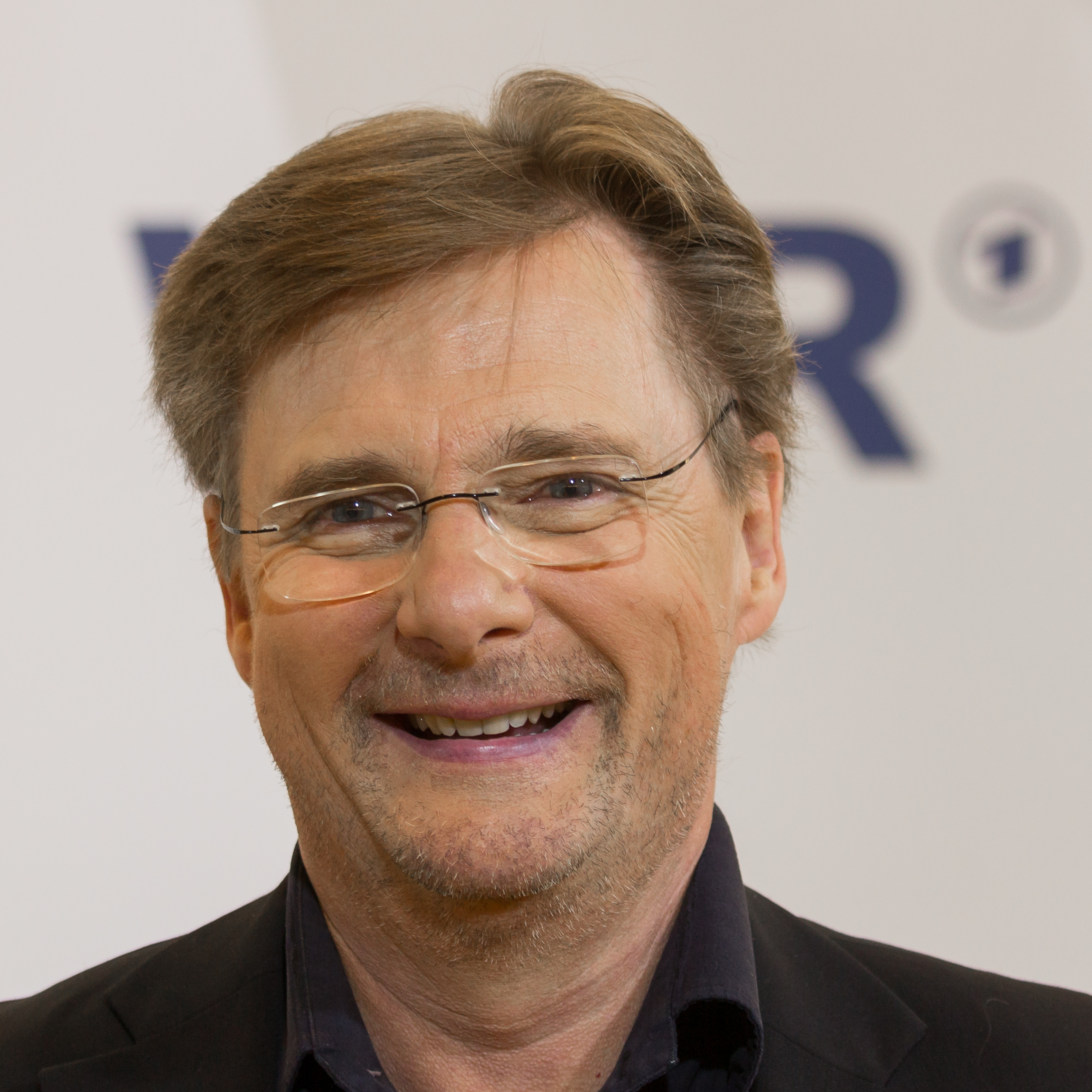
Stefan Parkman, 2014

Stefan Parkman (born 22 June 1952, in Uppsala) is a Swedish conductor. He is a professor at Uppsala University, where he holds the Eric Ericson chair of choral conducting.

From 2002 to 2005, Parkman was the head conductor of the Swedish Radio Choir, and he has also been the conductor of the Danish Radio Choir and the Boys' Choir of Uppsala Cathedral. From 1983 to 2023, he was the leader of Uppsala Akademiska Kammarkör.

Parkman was awarded the Danish Order of the Dannebrog in 1997. In 1998, he was elected a member of the Royal Swedish Academy of Music.
