= Lunds Studentsångförening =

Swedish amateur choir

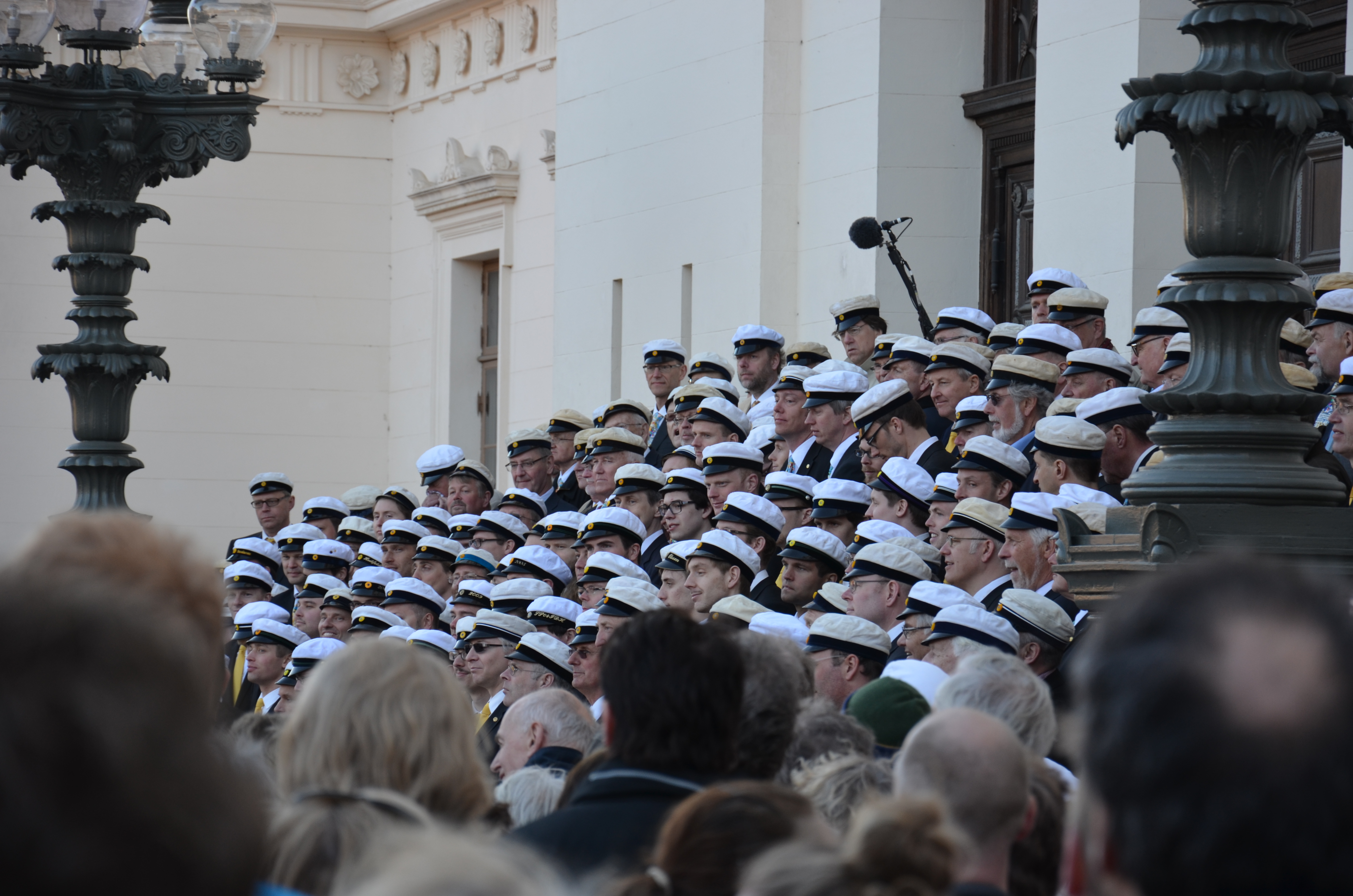
Lunds studentsångförening in television concert at the steps to the University Building in Lund May 1, 2012.

Conductors of Lunds Studentsångförening
From	To	Name
1831	1835	Sven Lovén
1831	spring 1846	Otto Lindblad
autumn 1846	spring 1852	Wilhelm Borg
spring 1852	spring 1854	P. E. Backman
spring 1854	autumn 1855	Samuel E. V. Follin
spring 1856	autumn 1856	August Hammar
autumn 1856	spring 1859	Carl Gustaf von Sydow
autumn 1859	spring 1860	Ludvig Ljungman
spring 1860	autumn 1875	Carl Gustaf von Sydow
spring 1876	autumn 1885	Henrik Möller
spring 1886	spring 1887	Hugo Andersson
autumn 1887	autumn 1889	Emil Norrman
spring 1890	spring 1891	Henrik Möller
spring 1891	spring 1894	Alfred Berg
autumn 1894	autumn 1895	Josef Lind
spring 1896	spring 1896	Gustav F. Steiner
autumn 1896	spring 1925	Alfred Berg
autumn 1925	spring 1926	Yngve Plym Forshell
1926	1933	Emil Gagner
1933	1948	Josef Hedar
spring 1949	spring 1949	Bengt Franzén
autumn 1949	autumn 1950	Knut Borglin
1951	1971	Axel Melander
1972	1985	Folke Bohlin
1985	1987	Bengt Hall
1988	1999	Janåke Larson
2000	2007	Mats Paulson
spring 2008	spring 2008	Fredrik Malmberg
		(acting conductor, spring concerts 2008)
summer/autumn 2008	July 2010	Tomas Caplin
autumn 2010		Johannes Nebel
		(acting conductor, autumn 2010)
February 2011	autumn 2012	Michael Bojesen
December 2012	autumn 2018	Andreas Lönnqvist
December 2019		Christian Schultze

Lund University Male Voice Choir (Swedish: Lunds Studentsångförening, LSS, also Lunds studentsångare) is a Swedish amateur choir, which counts its history from 1831. Today one of Sweden's top male choirs, the choir has assumed many different shapes during its history. Traditionally, most members have been students of Lund University although there is no requirement of studying at the university to be able to join the choir.

The choir is known for its three larger annual concert productions, one during autumn, one during Christmas season and one during spring. Smaller local concerts are held occasionally, while regionally, the choir frequently cooperates with symphonic orchestras, such as those of nearby Malmö or Helsingborg. Nationally, the choir is most known for its annual appearance at the stairs of the Lund University Main Building every 1 May, which is broadcast on national TV, with viewer numbers ranging from approximately 300,000 to 1,000,000.

== History ==
The starting date of LSS most often used is November 20, 1831. This was the first time a male quartet appeared at a concert in Lund, although there had been more or less loosely organized exercises for a couple of years. In 1833, the name LSS is referred for the first time, although at this point in time it is an abbreviation of Lilla Sångsällskapet (The Small Song Society). Five years later, the constitution of Lunds Studentsångförening appeared.

From the beginning, Sven Lovén was the conductor of the choir with Otto Lindblad as his right hand, and it seems as if Lindblad gained the role as the choir's leader from 1835. The early repertoire consisted mainly of German songs mixed with a few contributions of Lindblad. Over the years, he would provide more and more compositions.

During this time, the choir consisted of about 60 singers, with many of them also teaming up in various quartets. One of these was Lundakvartetten (the Lund Quartet) which consisted of Lindblad and three other singers. In 1846, this quartet embarked on the first tour made by a choir or quartet in Sweden, the purpose being to raise money to the building of a new home for Akademiska Föreningen (the Academic Society) in Lund. The journey was made on foot and reached as far as Stockholm and Gothenburg and lasted from just after midsummer to early October. The money that had been raised was handed over to Akademiska Föreningen but since the amount was considered too small, Lindblad and his friends were accused of having had unnecessary expenses and were never thanked.

Angered by the accusations (the quartet had made the tour on their own initiative and without any funding), Lindblad left Lund for Mellby in 1847. During the autumn of 1846 (due to Lindblad being on tour with the quartet), the leadership of the choir had been assumed by Wilhelm Borg. Although not an exceptional talent like Lindblad, Borg is regarded as instrumental in the history of the choir simply for keeping it alive in the coming years. Borg was followed by a few short appearances of various conductors before Carl Gustaf von Sydow made his first appearance in 1856. He would come to lead LSS until 1875 with the exception of one year, and an attempt was made to put together an elite choir as a subset of the whole choir, to go to the 1867 World Fair in Paris, but the plans fell through.

In 1876, however, younger singers managed to force into the position of conductor and leader the 24-year-old Henrik Möller. By singing less and practicing more, as the motto went, Möller gave the choir a new repertoire with artistic works such as cantates and works with orchestra, although he never left out Lindblad of the programme. The new efforts were both appreciated for the artistic up-lift as well as criticized for dropping (too much of) the nationalistic songs and what was perceived as typical student singing. The concept of an elite choir, as first conceived by von Sydow, was realized and tours were made in the years of 1878, 1882, and 1885. The elite choir, known as Lilla Kören (the Small Choir) would from now on be the face outwards for the choir, doing concerts and touring, while the larger, less skilled, choir would do rehearsals and social activities. At its fifty years anniversary at October 21, 1881, the choir inaugurated the premise in Akademiska Föreningen's house that was used for the weekly rehearsals until October 2010.

Following Möller in 1885, a long string of leaders came and went until Alfred Berg, known as Fader Berg (Father Berg), appeared in 1891. Making only a break for studies abroad during 1894 to 1896, Berg led the choir until 1925. The choir now received a much more stable organization, with a board consisting of chairman, vice chairman (always the conductor), a cashier and four regular members. Similarly, the elite choir Lilla Kören was given a much more solid ground with statutes about admission tests etc. that haven't changed much since. Many trips were made abroad, most notably the one to the Saint Louis World's Fair in 1904.

In 1933, Josef Hedar became the choir's conductor after Emil Gagner. Giving more room to sacral music and introducing his own compositions, he renewed the repertoire. Traces of both of these elements can be found in today's appearances by the choir. In 1947, a US tour was made with forty singers, but the controversies on who was to join and who should be left home made large parts of the choir so upset that LSS had pretty much disintegrated by the time the touring choir returned home. Hedar left the choir in 1948.

In 1951, Axel Melander appeared and revived the tours abroad and during the twenty years of his leadership, the choir regained its former level and status. Melander was supplanted by Folke Bohlin who made several changes to the organization and the programme of the choir. Using admission tests for new members and raising the tempo of the rehearsals, and thus the skill needed to be able to participate, the level of the main choir was significantly raised. At the same time Lilla Kören, which had previously been doing all the concerts and touring, was effectively turned into nothing but a society for singers who had been with the choir for a couple of years (they would still have to pass the admission tests to Lilla Kören).

Bohlin also introduced some of the annually returning concerts which still appear, such as Otto Lindblads dag (Otto Lindblad's day), to celebrate the founder, and the Lussikal which is performed early December and has a more common appeal to it than the artistic music performed otherwise.

As Bohlin left, Bengt Hall became the conductor of the choir. After only three years, however, he was supplanted by Janåke Larsson who led the choir through 1999, before Mats Paulson, who conducted the choir until his position expired with the ending of 2007. Mats had earlier announced that he would not continue as conductor, and during the spring 2008 the choir was conducted by Fredrik Malmberg. From the summer 2008 the choir is conducted by Tomas Caplin. Tomas first concerts with LSS was at an international choir conductor seminar in Copenhagen on the 25th of July and a small concept concert on the 26th of July at an old military fort, flakfortet, outside Copenhagen in the Öresund strait.

After a successful tour to the World Choir Games in China in the summer 2010, where they won the male voice choir section and gold medals in that section and the contemporary music section, and praised concerts at Expo 2010 and Jiaotong University in Shanghai, in Beijing and Tianjin, Thomas Caplin retired as conductor and was succeeded by acting conductor Johannes Nebel during the autumn 2010. In the Winter of 2011 the choir took part of opera barytone Peter Mattei's Music festival in Luleå.

During autumn 2010 the choir seized the opportunity to acquire the Salvation Army's old house in the centre of Lund. The acquisition was made possible by an earlier donation and the society now has its own house after 129 years in their old home, Sångsalen at Akademiska Föreningen next to the Lund University main building.

In May 2018, LSS recorded a rendition of Jean Sibelius's symphony Kullervo together with BBC Scottish Symphony Orchestra.

== Awards ==
The choir was awarded Best Male Choir at the 6th World Choir Games 2010 in Shaoxing, China.
