= Hans Leygraf =

Swedish classical pianist

Hans Leygraf (7 September 1920 – 12 February 2011) was a Swedish pianist, music educator, conductor and composer.

== Life ==
Born in Stockholm, Leygraf studied piano with Gottfrid Boon in Stockholm and Anna Hirzel-Langenhan in Switzerland. He was one of Sweden's most internationally renowned musicians and also a famous educator. He taught at Edsbergs musical institute outside Stockholm, in Darmstadt, Hanover, Berlin and Salzburg. In Salzburg he was professor of piano at the Mozarteum between 1972 and 1990, but continued until 2007 to give lessons for particularly talented students. He gave concerts back in 2010 (80 years after his debut) and was probably best known for his interpretations of Mozart and Schubert.

As a composer, Leygraf was a member of The Monday Group, but he stopped composing as early as the 1940s.

Leygrat died in Stockholm at the age of 90.

== Recordings ==
- Stenhammar Piano Concerto No. 2, Gothenburg Radio Orchestra / Sixten Eckerberg. Radiotjänst 1946
- Blomdahl: Chamber Concerto. London Symphony Orchestra, Sixten Ehrling. DECCA 1965
- Mozart: Piano Concerto K.414, Fantasia K.475, Sonata K.457. The Swedish Radio Symphony Orchestra, Stig Westerberg. EMI 1976
- Beethoven: Piano Concerto No. 2, Nationalmusei Chamber Orchestra, Claude Genetay. Polar 1980
- Mozart: Piano Sonatas. SR Records vol. 1 1982, vol. 2 1984
- Three Schubert Recitals. Caprice Records 1994
- Wolfgang Amadeus Mozart: The Complete Piano Sonatas. dB Productions 2002
- Claude Debussy: The Preludes. dB Productions 2006
- Joseph Haydn: Piano Sonatas, The 1960 and 2007 recordings, 2CD. dB Productions 2008
- Mozart: The Complete Piano Sonata Box. dB Productions Jan. 2006
- Beethoven: Opus 111 A Tribute to Pianist Hans Leygraf (1920–2011). dB Productions Sep. 2011 (Beethoven op. 110, recorded 1973 & Beethoven op. 111, recorded 1980)

== Videography ==
Hans Leygraf: Fundamental piano lessons, 2006.
