= Tjernberg =

Tjernberg is a Swedish surname. Notable people with the surname include:

- Gunilla Tjernberg (1950–2019), Swedish politician
- Lina Bertling Tjernberg (born 1973), Swedish electrical engineer
- Magdalena Tjernberg (born 1970), Swedish athlete
- Ove Tjernberg (1928–2001), Swedish actor
