= Rävlanda =

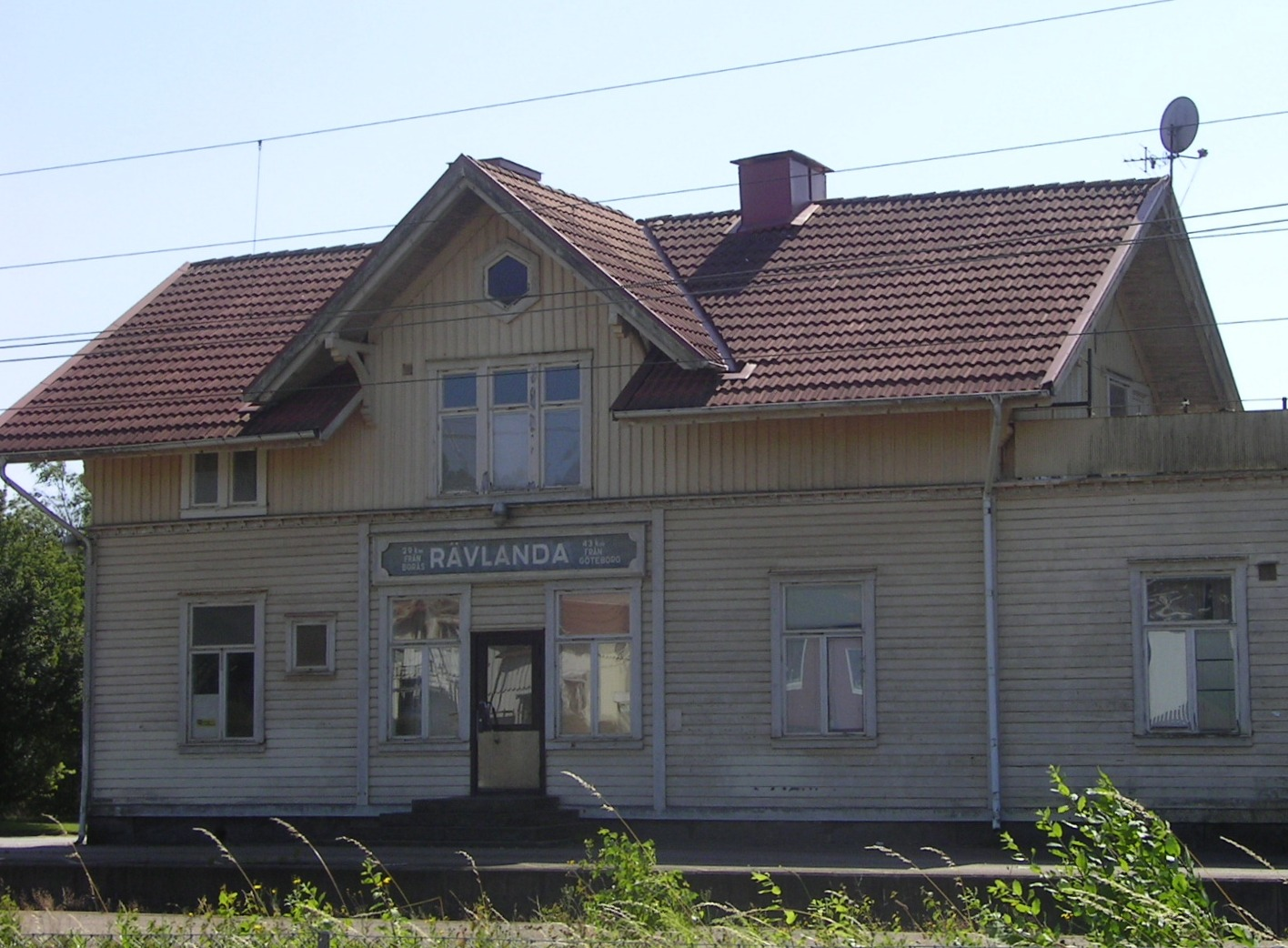
- Rävlanda train station

- Location within Västra Götaland Location within Sweden
- Coordinates: 57°39′N 12°30′E
- Country: Sweden
- Province: Västergötland
- County: Västra Götaland County
- Municipality: Härryda Municipality

Area
  - Total: 1.46 km^{2} (0.56 sq mi)

Population (2018)
  - Total: 1,532
  - Density: 999/km^{2} (2,590/sq mi)
- Time zone: UTC+1 (CET)
  - Summer (DST): UTC+2 (CEST)

Rävlanda is a locality situated in Härryda Municipality, Västra Götaland County, Sweden. It had 1,462 inhabitants in 2010.
