= Swedish Federation of Young Musicians =

Background information
- Years active: 1973 – present

The Swedish Federation of Young Musicians (Swedish: Riksförbundet Unga Musikanter) or RUM, is a democratic organization for young Swedish musicians and students of the Swedish music and culture schools.

RUM was established in 1973 but as a part of another organization. In 1978 (the birth year), RUM became an independent youth organization.
