= Arne Sunnegårdh =

Swedish vocal teacher (1907–1972)

Arne Sunnegårdh (4 August 1907 in Stockholm – 30 March 1972 in Danderyd, Stockholm County) was a Swedish vocal teacher and church musician.

== Biography ==
Sunnegårdh was active in Stockholm as the choirmaster at the Royal Swedish Opera, as a vocalist at the Royal College of Music, Stockholm and as a church musician (choir leader) in St. John's Church, Stockholm. He followed some song training with Modest Menzinsky. Erik Saedén was among Sunnegårdh's students.

He was awarded the title of professor by the government in 1963.

His children Thomas Sunnegårdh and Erika Sunnegårdh are opera singers.
