= Pixbo =

Locality in Västergötland, Sweden

Coordinates: 57.65095°N 12.08403°E

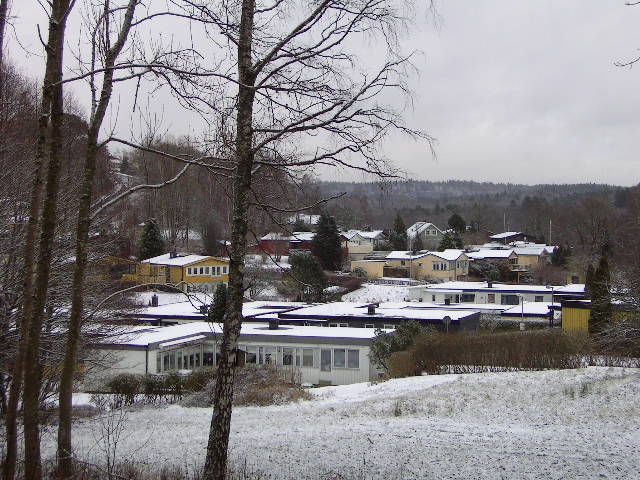
New Pixbo

Pixbo is a locality in Västergötland, Sweden. Most of it lies within Härryda Municipality, except for a minor part which belongs to Mölndal Municipality. The urban area to which it belongs is Mölnlycke.

The locality is known through Pixbo IBK.
