= Folke Bohlin (musicologist) =

Swedish musicologist and choral conductor

Folke Bohlin (born September 21, 1931, in Uppsala) is a Swedish musicologist and choral conductor. His chief area of research is Swedish church music, particularly that after the Reformation, and he is a former Professor emeritus of musicology at Lund University.

== Biography ==
Prior to his formal music education, Bohlin founded Uppsala Akademiska Kammarkör in 1957. From 1957 to 1968, Bohlin was first repetiteur and later assistant conductor of Orphei Drängar. Bohlin first earned a degree in theology in 1960. He also studied musicology under Carl-Allan Moberg and Ingmar Bengtsson at Uppsala University, graduating with his doctorate in 1970. His doctoral dissertation utilized his former background as he wrote on liturgical song in Swedish churches in the 18th and 19th centuries.

After his graduate studies, Bohlin became a reader at Lund University in 1970 and was appointed a lecturer there the following year. In 1972, he began leading the Lunds Studentsångförening (Lund Student Choral Society) for the next thirteen years. In 1982, Bohlin became an elected member of the Swedish Royal Academy of Music in 1982, later serving as a board member from 1983 to 1990. He was appointed a full professor at Lund University in 1986 until his retirement in 1996.

== Sources ==
- Veslemöy Heintz: "Folke Bohlin", Grove Music Online ed. L. Macy (Accessed December 1, 2008), (subscription access)
