= Stefan Ljungqvist =

Swedish tenor (1948–2023)

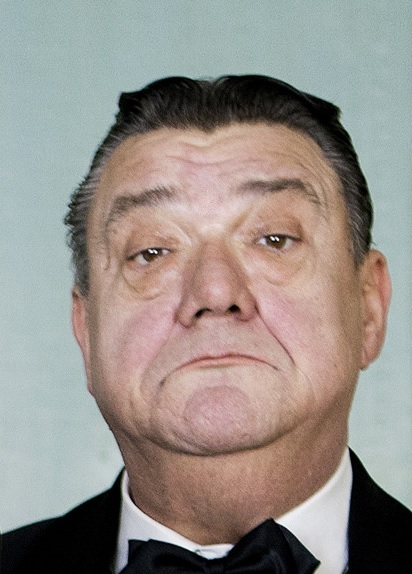
- Ljungqvist in 2011
- Born: 4 September 1948; Gothenburg, Sweden
- Died: 7 June 2023 (aged 74); Mölndal, Sweden
- Occupation: Tenor

Stefan Allan Ljungqvist (4 September 1948 – 7 June 2023) was a Swedish singer and actor.

== Life and career ==
Born in Gothenburg, Ljungqvist began his career in the late 1960s as a member of the band Jokers and performing as a troubadour under the stage name Trubadur X. In the early 1970s he studied at the University College of Opera, and started a professional career as an opera bass singer, performing in operas, musicals and revues. He entered the Svensktoppen chart twice, with the singles "Det är så hälsosamt och stärkande i fjällen" and "Evert".

As an actor, Ljungqvist was best known for the role of Evald Larsson in the long-running SVT television series Polisen i Strömstad. Also a voice actor, he voiced several Disney characters in their Swedish dubbed versions, notably Claude Frollo in The Hunchback of Notre Dame and John Ratcliffe in Pocahontas.

Ljungqvist died on 7 June 2023, at the age of 74.
