= Sven-Erik Bäck =

Swedish composer

Sven-Erik Bäck (16 September 1919 – 10 January 1994) was a Swedish composer of classical music. He was born in Stockholm.

Bäck studied from 1939 until 1943 in the King's Music-Academy and from 1940 until 1945, was a composition student of Hilding Rosenberg. He travelled in 1951 to have further studies with Goffredo Petrassi in Rome.

As of 1953 he was the leader of the chamber orchestra of the Swedish Radio Orchestra. He was also a member of string quartets - the Kyndel Quartet from 1940 to 1944 and the Barkel Quartet from 1944 to 1953.

Bäck composed three operas, five works for ballet, many concertos, a number of works for chamber ensemble including at least four string quartets, an oratorio, cantatas, choral works, lieder and music for plays and film.

He died in Stockholm in 1994. He was 74

== Works for stage and opera ==
- Tranfjädrarna (The Twilight Crane), Chamber Opera, 1956
- Gästabudet (The Banquet), Chamber Opera, 1956
- Fågeln (The Bird), Chamber Opera, 1960

== Chamber music ==
=== Chamber works other than piano solo works ===
- String quartets (nos. 1 (1945), 2 (1947), 3 (1962), 4 (1984))
- String quintet Exercitier (1948)
- Sonata for solo flute, 1949
- Sonata for two cellos, 1957
- Decet for wind quintet and string quintet (1973)
- String octet (1988)

=== Piano works ===
- Piano sonata (1942)
- Expansive preludes : for piano (1949)
- Sonata alla ricercare (1950) (recorded on MHS 3363, 1976 by Kjell Bækkelund, and on Roland Pöntinen's complete survey of Bäck's piano music for BIS)
- Sonata in two movements and epilogue (1984)

== Orchestra ==
=== Concertos ===
- Violin concerto (1957/1960)
- Cello concerto (1966)
- Ciclos, piano concerto (1977)

=== Without soloist ===
- String symphony (1951)
- Chamber symphony (1955)
- String symphony no. 2 (1986)
