= Otto Olsson =

Swedish organist and classical music composer

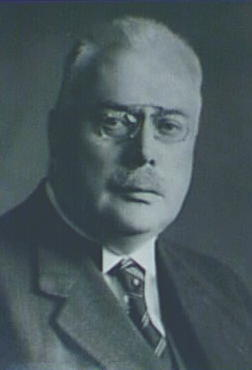
Olsson (c. 1935)

Otto Emanuel Olsson (19 December 1879 – 1 September 1964) was a Swedish organist and classical music composer.

== Life and career ==
Olsson, a native of Stockholm, was one of the most renowned organ virtuosos of his time. He studied organ with August Lagergren (1848−1908) and composition with Joseph Dente (1838−1905), both teachers having been employed at the Royal Swedish Academy of Music. Later Olsson himself joined the faculty there, becoming teacher of harmony (1908–24) and then organ (1924–45). Meanwhile he was also the organist at the Gustaf Vasa Church in Stockholm. He became a member of the Swedish Royal Academy of Music in 1915.

Olsson used his strong background in counterpoint, combined with an affinity for French organ music, to develop his late Romantic style of composition. He also had an interest in early music and, though not a Catholic but a Lutheran, used the plainchant techniques of Gregorian chant in his Gregorianska melodier. At times he explored polytonality in his output, an advancement not found in other Swedish compositions of the time. In addition to many fine pieces for the organ, he produced various choral works, the most often performed of which is his setting of the Te Deum, which requires not only chorus but string orchestra, harp, and organ.

As a teacher, Olsson influenced many Swedish musicians (especially church musicians), and he was important in the development of church music in Sweden, which had suffered a long period of decline before 1900. His activities included serving as a member of official committees that supervised the liturgy and hymnology. He also composed Psalm settings for congregational use and wrote two instructional books, on the art of choral singing and psalm singing respectively.

He died in Stockholm in 1964, aged 84.

== Works ==
=== Choral ===
- Advents och julsånger, for mixed choir and organ (1917)
  - Advent
  - Julsång
  - Gammal julvisa
  - Davids 121 psalm
  - Nyårspsalm
  - Guds Son är fødd (bearbetning af folkvisa)
  - Det brinner en stjärna i Österland
  - Jungfru Marias lovsång
- Gregorianska melodier (Six Gregorian Melodies), Op. 30 (1910)
- Sex latinska hymner (Six Latin Hymns), for a cappella choir, Op. 40 (1919)
  - Psalmus CXX
  - Canticum Simeonis
  - Psalmus CX
  - Jesu dulcis memoria
  - Ave Maris Stella
  - Rex gloriose martyrum
- Three Latin Choruses
  - Jesu corona celsior (for Uppsala Domkyrkas Gosskör)
  - Auctor beate saeculi
  - Aeterne Rex altissime
- Folksong arrangements and other works for male chorus
- Requiem op.13 (1903)

=== Organ ===
- Miniatyrer, Op. 5 (c.1895-1900)
- Five Canons, Op. 18 (1903-1910)
- Suite in G, Op. 20
- Credo Symphoniacum (1918)
- Fantasy and Fugue on the chorale "Vi lofva dig, o store Gud", Op. 29 ("for white keys", or phrygian mode)
- 12 orgelstycken över koralmotiv, Op. 36
- Organ Sonata in E major, Op. 38
- Preludium and fugue in C♯ minor, Op. 39 (1910)
- Variations on "Ave maris stella", Op. 42
- 5 Trios, Op. 44 (?1911)
- Credo symphoniacum, Op. 50 (1925)
- Preludium and fugue in F♯ minor, Op. 52 (1918)
- Preludium and fugue in D♯ minor, Op. 56 (1935)

=== Orchestra ===
- Symphony in G minor, Op. 11 (1901-1902)
- Requiem in G minor, Op. 13 (1903, first performance Stockholm, Nov. 1976)
- Te Deum, Op. 25 (1906)

=== Chamber music ===
- Piano Quintet in A major, Op. 1
- String Quartet, Op. 10
- String Quartet No. 2 (1906)
- String Quartet No. 3 (1947)
