= Gånglåt =

Swedish folk music form

A gånglåt is a category of Swedish traditional folk music; a fiddle tune in relaxed 4/4 or 2/4 meter. The name means "walking tune" in Swedish, and the traditional tempo is that of a stately walk. Not to be referred to/or confused with a march when this is spoken of in Swedish in the traditional genre. A gånglåt resembles a slow Irish reel in structure, with two (or, more rarely, three) 16-bar strains, each repeated twice, in the form AABB. Often the second A and B differs slightly in the end compared to the first instance.

The Swedish folk fiddle repertoire contains hundreds of traditional tunes in this form. They are often performed by several fiddlers (see: spelmanslag) in multiple-part harmony. Two of the most well known gånglåts are Gärdebylåten and Äppelbo gånglåt.
