= Ingmar Bengtsson =

Ingmar Bengtsson (2 March 1920 – 3 December 1989) was a Swedish musicologist, music critic, and music educator. Born in Stockholm, he was educated at the Royal Swedish Academy of Music where he was a pupil of Olof Wibergh and at Uppsala University where he studied musicology with Carl-Allan Moberg. He also studied privately with Gottfrid Boon. From 1943 to 1959 he was music critic for the newspaper Svenska Dagbladet. From 1961 to 1986 he was Chairman of the Swedish Society for Music Research and for several decades he served as editor for musicology journal Svensk tidskrift för musikforskning. He was the (senior) professor of musicology at Uppsala University from 1961 until his retirement in 1985.
