= Karl-Birger Blomdahl =

Swedish composer (1916–1968)

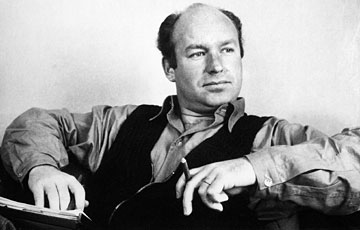
Karl-Birger Blomdahl.

Karl-Birger Blomdahl (19 October 1916 – 14 June 1968) was a Swedish composer and conductor born in Växjö. He was educated in biochemistry, but was primarily active in music and by his experimental compositions he became one of the big names in Swedish modernism. His teachers included Hilding Rosenberg. He died in Kungsängen, Stockholm.

His third symphony, Facettes – a work in one subdivided movement as a twelve-tone variation-form piece – from 1950 is a major contribution to the repertoire. In 1959 he composed the opera Aniara based on the poem by Harry Martinson. His output of compositions also includes concertos for violin and viola, a chamber concerto for piano, winds and percussion, at least one other opera (Herr von Hancken), and much chamber music, including a trio for clarinet, cello and piano.

== Works ==
=== Stage ===
- (1949) Agamemnon
- (1958) Aniara, (libretto by Erik Lindegren based on a poem by Harry Martinson)
  Recorded and released by Columbia Masterworks as a double-album in the mid-60s. An edited version of Aniara was also side 2 of Columbia Masterworks 1968 Eugene Ormandy – Leonard Bernstein cover-version-album of music from 2001: A Space Odyssey.) It was conducted by Werner Janssen, a noted conductor of the 20th Century. Columbia dropped Janssen's credit from its later releases of the album, leading to a wide but mistaken impression that the performance was conducted by Bernstein.
- (1962) Herr von Hancken (libretto by Erik Lindegren based on a book novel by Hjalmar Bergman)

=== Ballet ===
- (1954) Sisyfos
- (1957) Minotaurus
- (1962) Spel för åtta

=== Orchestra ===
- (1939) Symphonic Dances
- (1943) Symphony No. 1
- (1947) Symphony No. 2
- (1948) Pastoralsvit
- (1950) Symphony No. 3, Facetter
- (1961) Forma Ferritonans

=== Concerto ===
- (1941) Concerto for Viola and Orchestra
- (1946) Concerto for Violin and String Orchestra
- (1953) Chamber Concerto for Piano, Winds and Percussion

=== Choir ===
- (1951–52) I speglarnas sal (after a poem by Erik Lindegren)

=== Film music ===
- (1953) Gycklarnas afton
- (1965) Så börjar livet

=== Chamber music ===
- (1938) Trio for Brass
- (1939) String Quartet No. 1
- (1945) Little Suite, for bassoon & piano
- (1948) Dance Suite No. 1, for flute, percussion & string trio
- (1951) Dance Suite No. 2, for clarinet, cello & percussion
- (1955) Trio for clarinet, cello and piano

=== Songs ===
- (1966) ... The Journey in This Night for soprano & string orchestra (on a poem by Erik Lindegren)

=== Electronic ===
- (1966) Altisonans
