= Hilding Rosenberg =

Swedish composer and conductor (1892–1985)

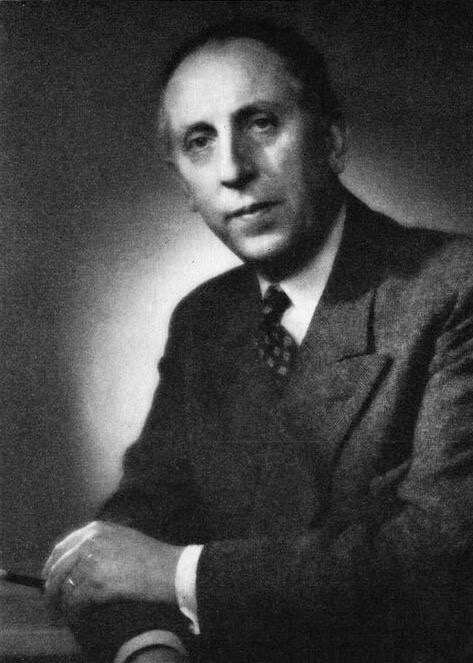
Hilding Rosenberg

Hilding Constantin Rosenberg (June 21, 1892 – May 18, 1985) was a Swedish composer and conductor. He is commonly regarded as the first Swedish modernist composer, and one of the most influential figures in 20th-century classical music in Sweden.

== Life and career ==
Born in Bosjökloster, he was an organist (completing his examinations in 1909), and as a young man a concert pianist and music teacher. In 1915 he began studying at the Stockholm Conservatory under Ernst Ellberg. Later teachers included Wilhelm Stenhammar (counterpoint) and Hermann Scherchen (conducting). Stenhammar included several of Rosenberg's early works in concerts he arranged. After the First World War, he toured Europe and became a prominent conductor. In 1920 he studied on a scholarship in Berlin, Dresden, Vienna and Paris, which brought formative contacts with Arnold Schoenberg and Paul Hindemith.

In 1932 he was appointed coach and assistant conductor of the Royal Swedish Opera, becoming its chief conductor two years later, although from this point composing began to take a prominent part in his life to conducting.

While his earlier works display the influence of Sibelius, he soon led the way for Swedish composers to move away from the late Romantic style and became considered as somewhat radical. His output covered all genres, from his 14 works for string quartet (1920–1972) and eight symphonies (1917–1974, including his symphony no. 2 Grave, symphony no. 4 Johannes Uppenbarelse, fifth symphony Örtagårdsmästaren and sixth Sinfonia Semplice) as well as Piano Concerto no. 2 to songs. He wrote a considerable body of work for the theatre (around 50 scores in total), including nine operatic works.

He taught composition privately to amongst others Karl-Birger Blomdahl, Ingvar Lidholm, and Daniel Börtz. He opined that "One creates out of what has been before, out of the experiences of others, as well as those of oneself, out of everything one knows, has read, or been acquainted with".

His violin concerto features as part of the sound track of the 1936 film Intermezzo, directed by Gustaf Molander and starring Ingrid Bergman and Gösta Ekman. He also composed music for the 1944 film Hets (known in English as either Torment or Frenzy), directed by Alf Sjöberg from a screenplay by Ingmar Bergman.

Rosenberg was vice-president of the Royal Swedish Academy of Music in 1951–1953, received an honorary doctorate from Uppsala University in 1951 and was an honorary member of the International Society for Contemporary Music. He died in Bromma, Stockholm.

== Selected compositions ==
=== Orchestral music ===
==== Symphonies ====
- Symphony (no. 0) (1915–1916, withdrawn)
- Symphony no. 1, op. 5 (1919, revised 1932, 1971)
- Symphony no. 2, op. 62 Sinfonia grave (1934)
- Symphony no. 3, The Four Ages of Man (1939, rev. 1943; 1949 with new third movement)
- Symphony no. 4, The Revelation of John, for baritone, choir and orchestra (1940; Bible, Hjalmar Gullberg)
- Symphony no. 5, Örtagårdsmästaren, for alto, mixed choir and orchestra (1944; Bible)
- Symphony no. 6, Sinfonia semplice (1951)
- Symphony no. 7, (1968, rev. 1968)
- Symphony no. 8, In candidum, for mixed choir and orchestra (1974; Vilhelm Ekelund; rev. 1980 as Sinfonia serena)

==== Concertante ====
- Suite in D major, op. 13 (1922, version for violin and orchestra)
- Violin concerto no. 1, op. 22 (1924)
- Trumpet concerto, op. 47 (1928)
- Variation macabre över eget tema for violin and orchestra (1929, from the music of Dåren och döden, op. 50, revised in 1953 for violin and small orchestra)
- Piano concerto (1930; unfinished, two movements)
- Sinfonia concertante for violin, viola, oboe, bassoon and orchestra (1935)
- Cello concerto no. 1 (1939)
- A Small Piece for cello, strings and organ (1940)
- Viola concerto (1942, rev. 1945, 1964; for viola and string orchestra)
- Piano concerto (1950)
- Violin concerto no. 2 (1951)
- Cello concerto no. 2 (1953)
- Riflessioni no. 1 for violin and string orchestra (1959)
- 5 pieces for piano and string orchestra (1965)

==== Other orchestral music ====
- 3 Fantasies for orchestra, op. 6 (1918)
- Variations and passacaglia for large orchestra (1922)
- Sinfonia da chiesa no. 1, op. 15 (1923, rev. 1950)
- Chamber symphony, C major, op. 18 (1923)
- Sinfonia da chiesa no. 2 (1924)
- Suite on Swedish songs for string orchestra, op. 36 (1927)
- Suite on De skapade intressena, op. 35 for chamber orchestra and organ (1927)
- Suite no. 1 on De skapade intressena (Marionetterna) op. 31a for small orchestra and harp (1927)
- Funeral music, op. 43 (1927; for Wilhelm Stenhammar)
- Prelude to Yttersta domen (The Last Judgment) for small orchestra (1929)
- Suite from Yttersta domen (The Last Judgment) for string orchestra (1929)
- Suite no. 1 from Yttersta domen (The Last Judgment) op. 49 for large orchestra (1929)
- Suite no. 2 for small orchestra from Marionetterna op 31b (1930)
- Suite no. 1 from Livet en dröm for salon orchestra (1930)
- Suite no. 2 from Livet en dröm for large orchestra (1930)
- Suite from Moralitet (1930)
- En festmarsch (1930)
- De glada resenärerna (arr. for string orchestra) after Resa till Amerika (Voyage to America) (1932)
- Symphonic Suite from Resa till Amerika (Voyage to America) (1934)
- Overtura Piccola from Hus med dubbel ingång (1934, arr. for military band)
- Dance Suite from Resa till Amerika (Voyage to America) for small orchestra (1935, arr. Yngve Sköld)
- Dance Suite from Resa till Amerika (Voyage to America) (version for string orchestra) (1936, arr. Yngve Sköld)
- Bergslagsbilder (Bergslagen Pictures) op 72, suite from film music for Bergslagsfolk (1937; Edvard Åkerberg)
- Overture to Marionetter (1938)
- Dance suite from Marionetter (1938)
- Taffelmusik (Divertimento) for chamber orchestra (1939; revision of Taffelmusik for violin, cello and piano)
- Dance Suite I Bergakungens sal, from De två konungadöttrarna (1940)
- Djufar, suite for orchestra (1942)
- Vindarnas musik, suite from Lycksalighetens for orchestra (1943)
- Music from the ballet Orfeus i sta'n (Orpheus in the City) (1945)
- Overtura Bianca-nera for string orchestra (1946)
- Concerto no. 1 per orchestra d'archi (1946)
- Partita for orchestra from Josef och hans bröder (Joseph and his brothers), (1947)
- Concerto no. 2 for large orchestra (1949)
- Concerto no. 3, Louisville Concerto (1954, rev. 1968)
- Ingresse solenne del premio Nobel, festive overture (1952)
- Lento per orchestra d'archi Elegie – Ungernkrisen (Elegy – Hungarian Crisis) (1956)
- Riflessioni no. 2 for string orchestra (1960)
- Riflessioni no. 3 for string orchestra (1960)
- Metamorfosi sinfoniche no. 1 for large orchestra, from the ballet Salome (1963)
- Metamorfosi sinfoniche no. 2, Andantino and theme with 7 variations from the ballet Salome (1963)
- Metamorfosi sinfoniche no. 3, from the ballet Sönerna (The Sons) (1964)
- Concerto no. 4 for string orchestra (1966)

=== Chamber music ===
==== String quartets ====
- String Quartet no. 1 op. 9 (1920, rev. 1923, 1955)
- String Quartet no. 2 op. 21 (1924, rev. 1955)
- String Quartet no. 3 op. 28 Quartetto pastorale (1926, rev. 1955)
- String Quartet no. 4 (1939)
- String Quartet 1942 (1942, unfinished)
- String Quartet no. 5 (1949)
- String Quartet no. 6 (1953)
- String Quartet no. 7 (1956)
- String Quartet no. 8 (1957)
- String Quartet no. 9 (1957, rev. 1964)
- String Quartet no. 10 (1957)
- String Quartet no. 11 (1957)
- String Quartet no. 12 Quartetto riepilogo (1957)
- 6 Moments musicaux for string quartet, Carl Nielsen in memoriam (1972)

Violin and piano

- Suite for violin and piano in D major, op. 13 (1922)
- Sonata for violin no. 1 op. 32 (1926)
- Sonata for violin no. 2 op. 85 (1940)

Other chamber music

- Piano quintet in D major op. 3 (1917)
- Trio for flute, violin and alto op. 11 (1920)
- Sonatine for flute and piano op. 19 (1923)
- Prelude and aria for violin and piano op. 25 (1925)
- Trio for oboe, clarinet and bassoon op. 42 (1927)
- Divertimento for string trio, op. 67 (1936)
- Taffelmusik for violin, cello and piano (1939)
- Serenade for flute, violin and viola op. 82 (1940)
- Brass quintet (1959, rev. 1968)

=== Solo compositions ===
==== Piano sonatas ====
- Piano sonata no. 1 op. 17 (1923)
- Piano sonata no. 2 op. 27 (1925)
- Piano sonata no. 3 op. 20 (1926)
- Piano sonata no. 4 op. 35 (1926)

==== Other piano music ====
- 3 intermezzos for piano op. 1 (1916)
- 8 plastiska scener (8 plastic scenes) for piano op. 10 (1921)
- Suite for piano op. 20 (1924)
- 11 small études for piano op. 24 (1925)
- 2 pieces for piano (1927)
- Improvisations for piano (1939)
- Theme and variations for piano (1941, 17 variations)
- 6 polyphonic études for piano (1945)
- 11 new small études for piano (1949)
- Sonatine for piano (1949)
- De kära sekunderna (1962)

==== Organ ====
- 4 choral preludes op. 38 (1927)
- Fantasia and Fugue (1941)
- Prelude and Fugue (1948)
- Toccata, Aria Pastorale, Chaconne (1952)
- Sequence 40 (1961)
- Chorale Variations on the hymn Lover Gud i himmelshöjd (1965)
- Fantasia in D minor

==== Violin ====
- Sonata no. 1 for solo violin op. 12 (1920, rev. 1966)
- Sonata no. 2 for solo violin (1953)
- Sonata no. 3 for solo violin (1963, rev. 1967)

==== Other ====
- Legend för valthor (1929)
- Sonata for solo flute (1959, rev. 1965)
- Sonata for solo clarinet (1960)
