= Oni Wytars =

Early music ensemble

Oni Wytars is an early music ensemble that was founded in 1983 by Marco Ambrosini and Peter Rabanser.

== Music ==
Appearing in concerts and at festivals throughout Europe, the Americas, and the Middle and Far East, they perform music of the Middle Ages and Renaissance as well as classical and traditional Arab and Turkish music. The focal point of Oni Wytars' work is to unite the many traditions that have influenced and enriched European musical culture for centuries by building a bridge between ancient and still-thriving musical traditions, between the Orient and Occident. Oni Wytars balances on the edge between early and modern traditional music blending elements from both the rich cultural heritage of medieval Europe and from their own diverse backgrounds – the instrumentalists and singers come from Austria, Germany, Italy, France, Switzerland, Iran, Spain, the UK and the US – Oni Wytars has developed an intriguing performance style.

== Instruments ==
They perform on instruments from the European Middle Ages and Renaissance, and on contemporary Arabic and Eastern European folk instruments. These include vielle, rebec, pochette, nyckelharpa, vihuela d´arco, hurdy-gurdy, oud, baglama, harp, shawm, cornett, chalumeau, ney, kaval, French and Bulgarian bagpipes, recorders, and Persian and Arabic percussion such as davul, zarb, bendir, darabukka and riqq.

== Musicians ==
- Marco Ambrosini - nyckelharpa, vielle, violino d´amore, harmonic flute, shawm
- Katharina Dustmann - zarb, darabuka, bendir, davul, riqq
- Peter Rabanser - oud, chalumeau, French and Bulgarian bagpipes, voice
- Riccardo Delfino - Celtic harp, arpa doppia, gothic harp, hurdy-gurdy, bagpipes
- Michael Posch - recorders and reedflutes
- Belinda Sykes - voice, reed instruments
- Ian Harrison - shawm, cornett, bagpipes
- Jane Achtman - vielle, viola da gamba
- Thomas Wimmer - vielle, viola da gamba
- Uschi Laar - harp
- Carlo Rizzo - tamburello
- Luigi Lai - Launeddas
- Jule Bauer - nyckelharpa, voice
- Michael Behringer - organ
- Gabriella Aiello - voice
- Giovanna Pessi - harp
- Glen Velez - Frame Drums

Depending on the music and the occasion Oni Wytars play in different instrumentation and invite other musicians to play with them as guests from time to time.

== Additional ensembles ==
In great demand as soloists, members of Oni Wytars collaborate on numerous recording and concert performances with internationally acclaimed artists and ensembles such as the "Clemencic Consort", "Accentus", "Ensemble Unicorn" (Austria), "Katharco Early Music Consort", "Sequentia" (Germany), "Els Trobadors" (Spain), Michael Riessler (Germany), Renaud-Garcia Fons (France), Glen Velez (USA).

== Teachers ==
The Ensemble Oni Wytars teaches early music on the "Stages of Early Music" at the castle Burg Fürsteneck in Germany.

== Discography ==
- "Carmina Burana" Ensemble Oni Wytars & Unicorn Ensemble Vienna.
- "On the way to Bethlehem" Ensemble Oni Wytars & Unicorn Ensemble Vienna.
- "Music of the Troubadours" Ensemble Oni Wytars, Unicorn Ensemble Vienna & Maria Laffitte
- From Byzantium to Andalusia
- Crai, crai, crai Ensemble Oni Wytars & Pascale van Coppenolle
- Canto Novello Laude Ars Choralis Coeln & Ensemble Oni Wytars
- Mediterraneum
- La Follia
- Cantar d'amore
- Pentameron
