= La Cantiga del Fuego =

Studio album by Ana Alcaide
- Released: 13 November 2012
- Recorded: 2012
- Genre: World music
- Length: 53:54
- Label: ARC Music
- Producer: Ana Alcaide

Ana Alcaide chronology
Como la Luna y el Sol (2007)	La Cantiga del Fuego (2012)	Tales of Pangea (2015)

La Cantiga del Fuego (literally "the song of fire" in Spanish) is the third studio album by Ana Alcaide, released in November 12, 2012 and sung in both Spanish and Judeo-Spanish.

== Track listing ==
All tracks are written by Ana Alcaide (Beatriz Moreno-Cervera for "El pozo amargo").

Track listing
No.	Title	Length
1.	"El pozo amargo"	5:13
2.	"Baila donde el mar"	4:34
3.	"La cantiga del fuego - el viaje"	4:07
4.	"Luna sefardita"	5:18
5.	"Khun caravan"	5:23
6.	"La reina Ester"	4:17
7.	"En el jardín de la reina"	4:41
8.	"El agua del río"	3:48
9.	"La cantiga del fuego - la canción"	4:07
10.	"Ay que casas!"	4:55
11.	"Mikdash Intro"	2:36
12.	"Mikdash"	3:47

== Personnel ==
Taken from the album's booklet:

- Ana Alcaide - vocals, nyckelharpa, violin, soundscrapes, Celtic harp
- Reza Shayesteh - vocals
- Bill Cooley - psaltery, santur, ud, medieval lute, tar
- Jaime Muñoz - clarinet, diatonic accordion, Turkish ney, kaval, bagpipe, drums
- Rafa del Teso - acoustic guitar, mandola
- Josete Ordoñez - additional acoustic guitar, Spanish guitarrillo
- Renzo Ruggiero - acoustic bass, sound effects, electric bass, hurdy-gurdy
- Dimitri Psonis - Greek lyra, additional santur
- Ido Segal - hansa veena
- Sergey Saprychev - percussion
- Diego López - additional percussion
