= Marco Ambrosini =

Italian musician, composer and arranger (born 1964)

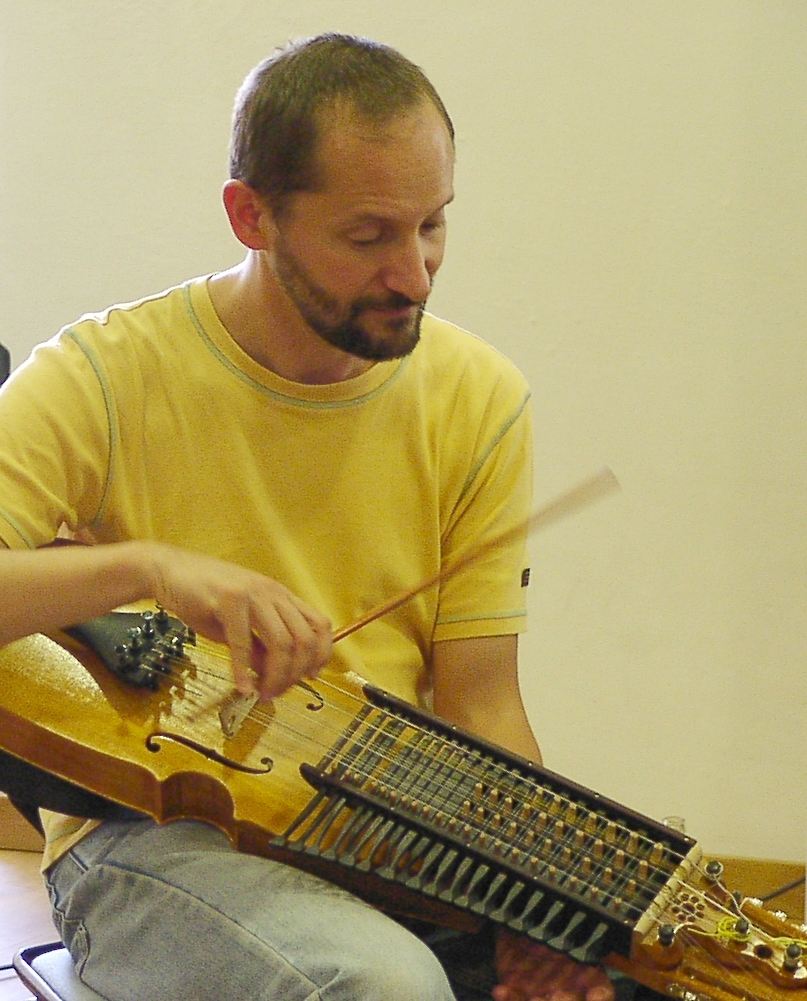
- Ambrosini with the Nyckelharpa
- Born: 1964 (age 61–62); Forlì, Italy
- Occupations: Musician; Composer; Arranger
- Website: www.ambrosini.de

Marco Ambrosini (born 1964) is an Italian musician, composer and arranger living in Germany. In 1982, he founded the international ensemble, Oni Wytars, together with Peter Rabanser.

== Studies ==
Ambrosini was born in Forlì in 1964. From 1971 to 1981, Ambrosini studied violin and viola (with Adrio Casagrande) and composition with Mario Perrucci at the "Instituto Musicale G.B.Pergolesi" in Ancona and at the conservatory "G.Rossini" in Pesaro.

== Musician ==
Ambrosini debuted as a soloist and nyckelharpa player in the theatre "Alla Scala" in Milan, in concerts for the Royal Swedish Concert Agency, in the Alte Oper Frankfurt, in the Philharmony in Cologne, Berlin, Moscow, in the Carnegie Hall of New York and also perform with different ensembles for early music, baroque music and contemporary music. Worldwide concert activity includes over 150 CDs, broadcast and television shots as a composer, soloist, or as member of the Katharco Early Music Consort and the ensemble Oni Wytars (Germany), Els Trobadors (Spain), ensemble Unicorn, ensemble Accentus, Clemencic Consort, Armonico Tributo Austria, Ensemble Kapsberger (Rolf Lislevand, Norway), L'Arpeggiata (Christina Pruhar, France), Giovanna Pessi Ensemble (Switzerland), Lucilla Galeazzi, Ensemble La Chimera (IT), Vox Clamantis (EE), Jean-Louis Matinier and with Michael Riessler.

== Music ==
- Since 1991 Ambrosini played together with Katharina Dustmann as artistic director/conductor of the "Studio Katharco - sound:creations".
- In 1993 Ambrosini was selected by the German radio station "SWR" as a composer for the “New Jazz Meeting”.
- To celebrate the jubilee of 1200 years of the city of Frankfurt am Main he composes the musical theater production "Emperors Coronation" (direction: W. Lenssen).
- In 1995, on behalf of the Ministry for Education and Culture, he composed the music for the musical theater production "La Divina Commedia" (Theatre forum, direction: W. Lenssen).
- In 1996 he was selected it by the Swedish radio as an interpreter and composer for the Nordic Jazz Meeting.
- In 1997 he was musical director for the Celebration of the Renaissance in Lemgo (Germany).
- By order of the concert hall "Alte Oper – Frankfurt" and the Italian Institute of Culture he composed in collaboration with Katharina Dustmann "The Return of the Marco Polo". premiere 1998.
- In 1999, premier of "Between Skies and Hell" (composed together with Katharina Dustmann), direction: Wolfram Lenssen
- 2000 premier of "misch:lagen".
- 2001 premier of "Zechenzirkus".
- 2002 premier of "Illumina" (for the European exhibition of the art of gardens "EUROGA 2002") and "QuasiBolero" (for the appointment of an old German mine "Zollverein" as a World Heritage Site by the UNESCO.
- 2003 "Illumina 2", "ExtraSchicht" and "Ensemblia" (composed together with Katharina Dustmann), direction: W. Lenssen.
- 2004 "Magic Illumina" and "Centro" (film music, composed together with Katharina Dustmann), direction: W. Lenssen.
- 2006 "Wasserquintett", composed together with Katharina Dustman, direction by Imma Schmidt.
- 2007 „Die Pennschnecke Jonathan“, a radio drama by Thos Renneberg
- 2011 „LA FOLLIA - the Triumph of Folly“, (Sony music)
- 2013 "Janicar super Ambarabaccicciccoccò", for the EU-project ENCORE (www.encore.nyckelharpa.eu)
- 2014 Inventio, with J.-Louis Matinier (ECM)
- 2016 Pippi Langstrumpf - Hallenberg, mit Katharina Dustmann
- 2017 Jim Knopf - Hallenberg, mit Katharina Dustmann

== Discography ==
A discography with more than 160 CD published between 1991 and 2019 can be found on the homepage of Marco Ambrosini.

== Publications ==
"Einführung in die mittelalterliche Musik" (introduction to the medieval music, only in German, in collaboration with Michael Posch, 1992, ISBN 3-927240-13-3)

"The search for a methodology in devising exercises suitable for different types of nyckelharpa", 2011, CADENCE e-book

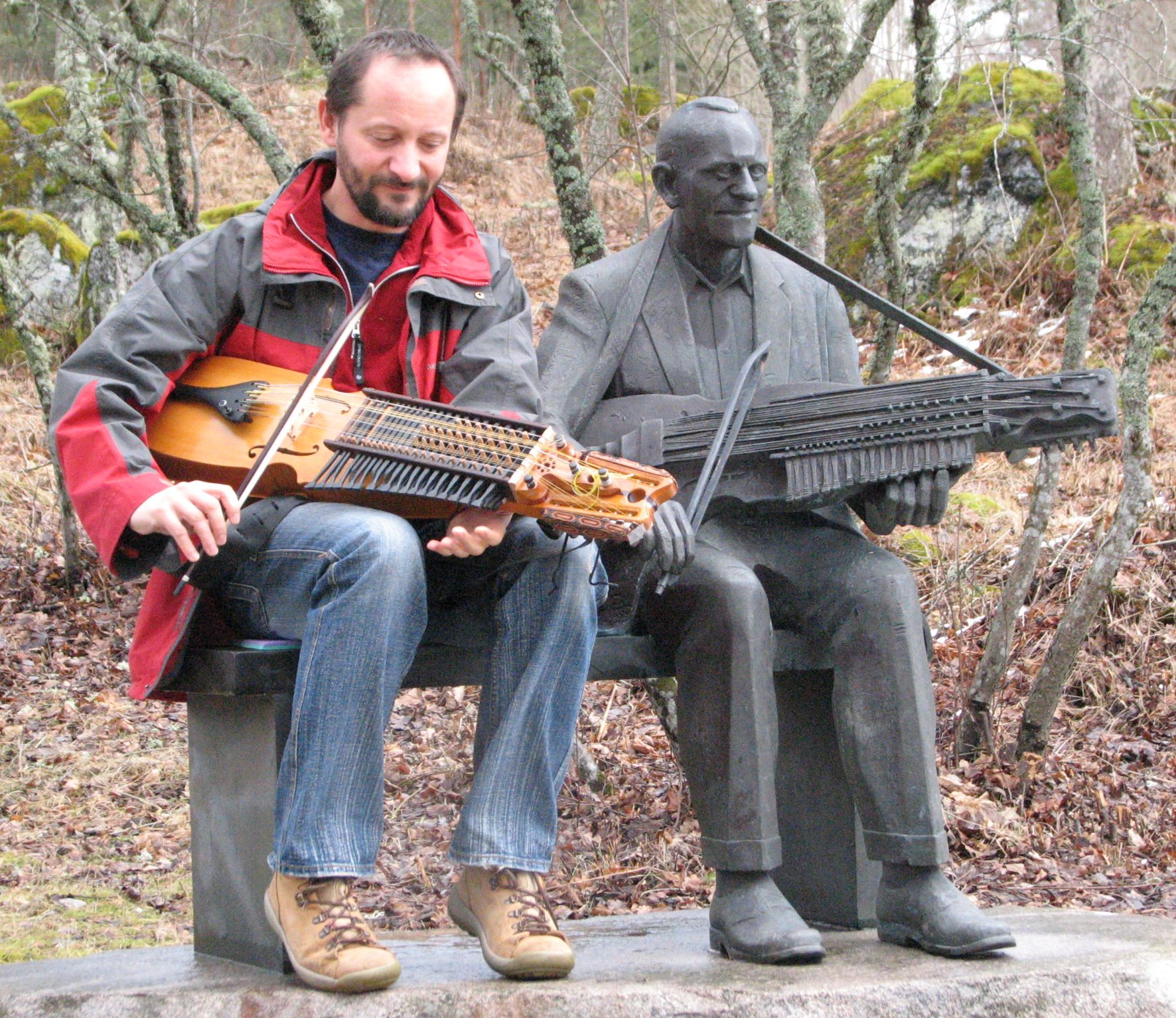
Marco Ambrosini playing his nyckelharpa at the monument of the great Swedish Nyckelharpa player Eric Sahlström (March 2008)

"Nyckelharpa - EXERCISES for daily practice", 2012, ISBN 978-3-943060-04-1

"Nyckelharpa Symbols and Notation", (in collaboration with Jule Bauer) 2013, ISBN 978-3-943060-01-0

"A.Vivaldi: La Primavera" (Edition for 3 Dudays and B.c.), 2013, ISBN 978-3-943060-10-2

"A.Vivaldi: L'Autunno" (Edizion for 4 Dudays, viola e B.c.), ISBN 978-3-943060-11-9

"Orlando Gibbons, Fantasies of Two, Three and Six Parts" (Edition for Nyckelharpa- Schlüsselfidel-Viola d'amore a chiavi, ISBN 978-3-943060133

"Johann Sebastian Bach, Zweistimmige Inventionen - Two Parts Inventions" (Arranged for Nyckelharpa-Viola d'amore a chiavi & Accompaniment), 2018, ISBN 978-3-943060-15-7

== Nyckelharpa ==
Since 1983 Ambrosini has played the Nyckelharpa as one of the first full-time musicians since the baroque time outside of Sweden.

Together with the former skilled violin makers and today's Nyckelharpa makers Jean Claude Condi and Annette Osann (France) he helped further develop the instrument.

== Pedagogics ==
Ambrosini is teaching early music at the "Stages for Early Music at castle Burg Fürsteneck" (Germany) and on other occasions.

He is the initiator and conductor of the "European Nyckelharpa Training", that takes place in co-operation of the "Scuola di Musica Popolare di Forlimpopoli", Italy, the academy "Burg Fürsteneck" near Fulda, Germany, and the "Eric Sahlström Institutet" in Tobo, Sweden, as a vocational trainer for musicians on the Nyckelharpa. He is also the didactic director of the Early Music Summer Master Classes in Bertinoro, Italy, in co-operation with Fondazione Alma Mater (Bologna University) and the Music and Arts University of the City of Vienna.
