= August Bohlin =

Swedish musician (1877–1949)

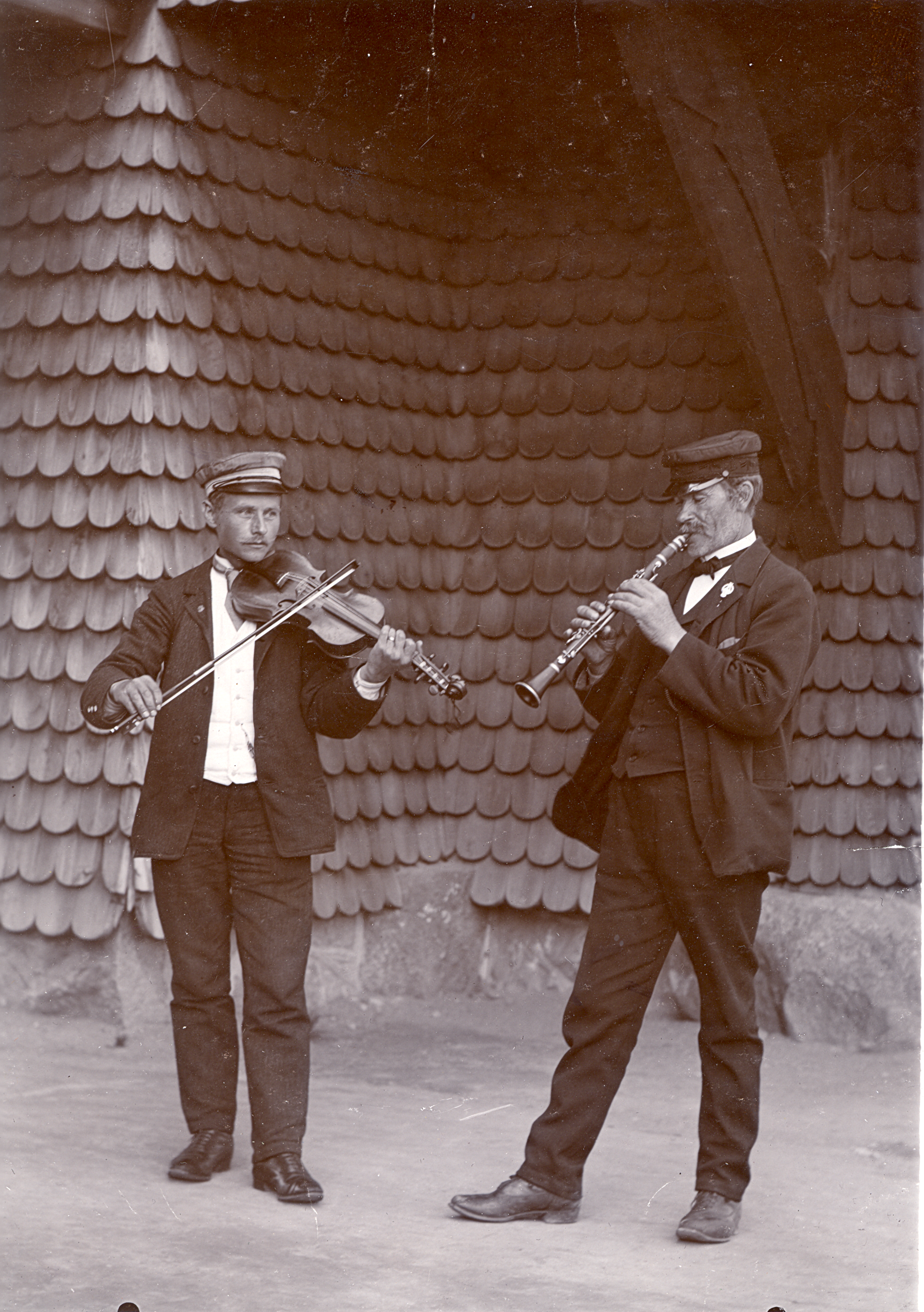

Background information
- Born: 7 July 1877
- Died: 19 May 1949
- Instruments: nyckelharpa and fiddle

August Bohlin (born 7 July 1877 Österlövsta; died 19 May 1949) was a nyckelharpist and fiddler from Uppland, Sweden. He is known for developing the three-row nyckelharpa of today in 1929.

August came from a musical family; his father Johan was a skilled nyckelharpist. Father and son produced three albums together in 1913 (Odeon 840, 845 and 847).
