= Ana Alcaide =

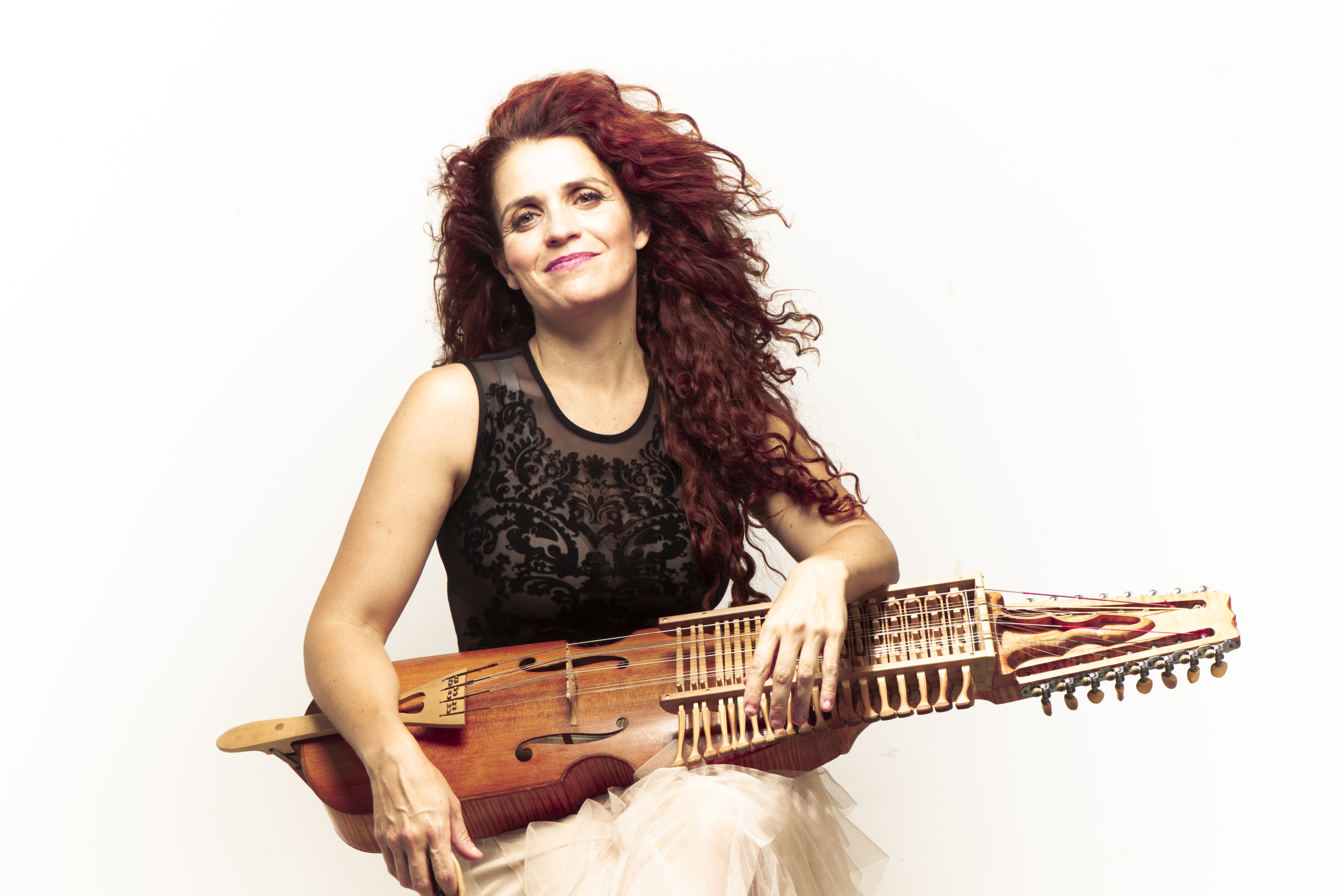
- Ana Alcaide in 2022

Background information
- Born: 1976 (age 49–50); Madrid, Spain
- Genres: World, Sephardic
- Occupations: Singer, Instrumentalist, Composer, music producer
- Instrument: Nyckelharpa
- Years active: 2006-present
- Website: www.anaalcaide.com

Ana Alcaide (born 1976, Madrid, Spain) is a Spanish performer, composer and music producer who carries out research on ancient traditions and cultures.

== Biography ==
At the age of seven Alcaide took up classical violin. She studied at the Getafe Conservatory of Music (Madrid) and later at Lund University (Sweden). She has received formal scientific and musical training in several countries (Spain, Sweden and Mexico) and holds a biology degree with a specialization in botany from the Complutense University in Madrid.

After being awarded a biology scholarship in 2000, Alcaide travelled to Sweden where she was first exposed to the Nyckelharpa, a traditional Swedish instrument that dates from medieval times. Attracted by the complexity and depth of its sound, Alcaide taught herself how to play the nyckelharpa on the streets of Toledo, Spain.

In 2005 she returned to Sweden to further pursue her music studies and to specialize in this Swedish folk instrument. During this time she was also influenced by other musical traditions and began studying other instruments and voice. She graduated from Malmö Academy of Music (Bachelor in Performing Arts) after successfully completing a personalized program in which she focused on world music, combining her interest in traditional music with the study of more modern techniques.

Alcaide published her debut album Viola de Teclas ("Keyed Viola", an alternative name for the nyckelharpa in Spanish) in 2006. She has played a pioneering role in introducing and popularizing the nyckelharpa in Spain. Her second album, Como la luna y el sol, was the result of the final degree project she completed while at the Malmö Academy of Music. This album features interpretations of traditional Sephardic music. In late 2009 she compiled her first three years of work on the DVD Ana Alcaide en concierto, which was filmed in a historic Jewish synagogue (‘El Tránsito’ – Toledo, Spain) alongside her usual collaborators. In 2012, after taking time off to have her first child, Alcaide released her third album, La cantiga del fuego.

== Discography ==
- Viola de teclas (2006)
- Como la Luna y el Sol (2007)
- La Cantiga del Fuego (2012)
- Tales Of Pangea (2015)
- Leyenda (2016)
- Ritual (2022)
- Antiqua Nova (2026)
