= Hyperborea (band) =

Finnish folk music group

Hyperborea is a folk music group, comprising four Finnish musicians. They are:

- Piia Kleemola - fiddle, viola, kantele, vocals
- Antti Paalanen - accordion
- Petri Prauda - cittern, mandolin, bagpipes, vocals
- Paula Susitaival - fiddle, keyed fiddle (nyckelharpa), vocals

They have released two albums on CD – Perinnearkku (2004) and Semmosta (2006).

Prior to Antti Paalanen joining the group in 2002, the initial trio mainly played French and French-Canadian music. Since 2002, they have focused on Finnish traditional tunes. The lyrics of their song "Viikoksi viriä mieli" (from Perinnearkku) follow a similar rhythmic pattern to the great Finnish epic Kalevala (although this pattern cannot be exactly replicated in English).

Hyperborea were the 2006 band of the year at the Kaustinen Folk Music Festival held annually in the small community of Kaustinen, Central Ostrobothnia, Finland.

== See also ==
- Finnish music
