= Emmislöv Church =

- Emmislövs kyrka
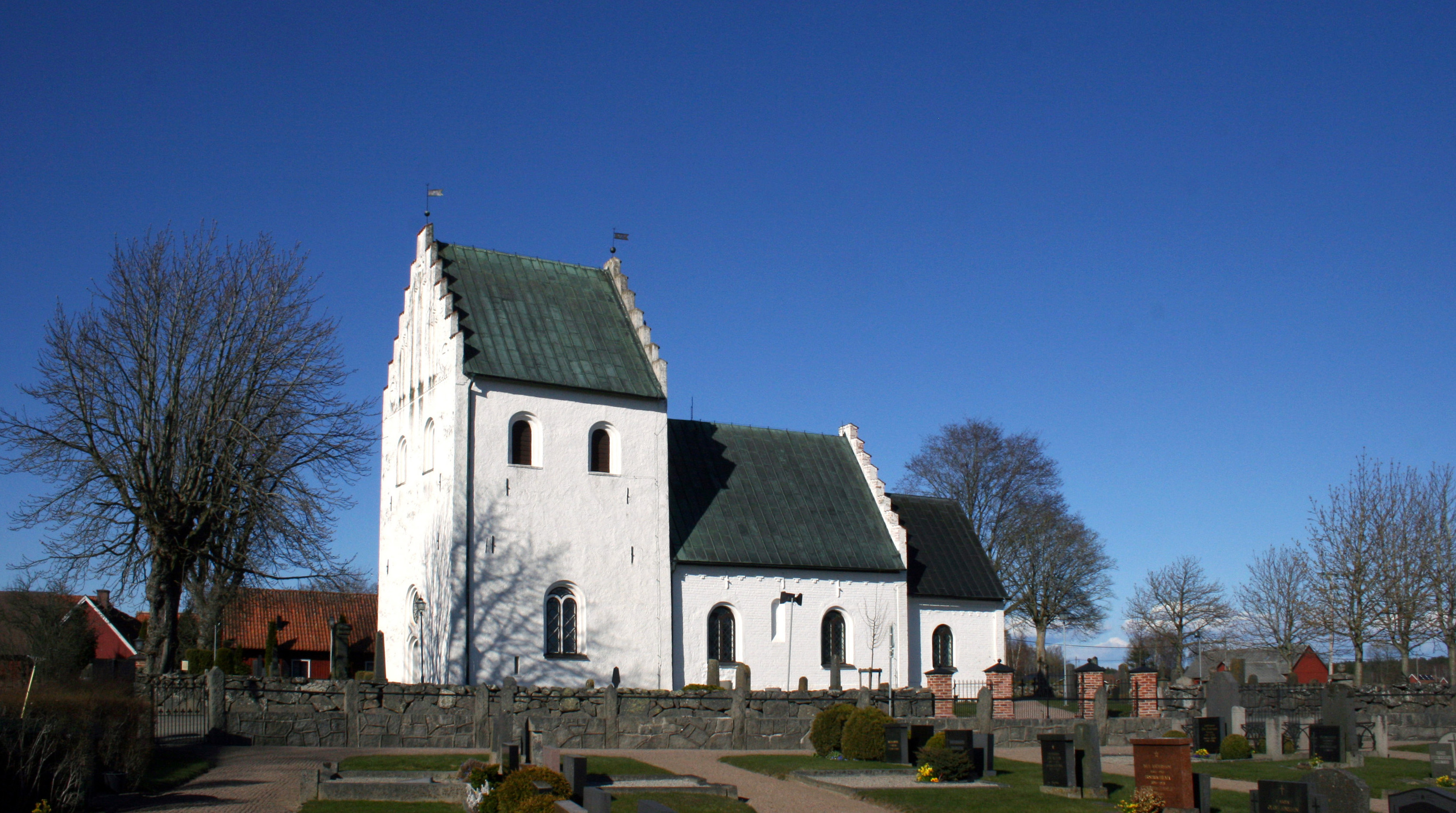
- Emmislöv Church

- 56°13′23″N 14°06′30″E
- Country: Sweden
- Denomination: Church of Sweden

Administration
- Diocese: Lund

Emmislöv Church (Swedish: Emmislövs kyrka) is a church in Emmislöv, Östra Göinge Municipality, Sweden. It was built c. 1200 and contains several medieval murals.

== History ==
Emmislöv Church was built c. 1200, possibly at the initiative of Bishop Absalon. A church porch was added during the 14th century, and the vaults that support the ceiling were constructed during the first half of the 15th century, apparently after a fire damaged the church. The western facade was demolished in 1849–1850 and replaced with a church tower designed by Carl Georg Brunius. One of two sacristies was also demolished during the 19th century. The remaining sacristy is one of the largest medieval sacristies in Scania and dates from the 14th century. A renovation was carried out in 1950–52. At this time, medieval murals were discovered and uncovered from under layers of whitewash.

== Architecture, murals and furnishings ==
The church is constructed of brick. The nave and choir are still the oldest parts of the church. It contains wall and vault paintings from different periods. Fragments of Romanesque paint from the 13th century survives in a few places. Most of the decorations are however from the 1460s. The vault of the choir has paintings made by Nils Håkansson, depicting the Trinity surrounded by angels making music (including an angel with a nyckelharpa) and the saints Lawrence, Nicholas, Olaf, Eric, Canute and Sigfrid. There are also depictions of Martin of Tours and Helena of Skövde.

The paintings in the nave are contemporary with those in the choir but possibly made by a pupil of Nils Håkansson. They depict the Genesis, the fall of man and life after the fall of man. There is also a modern painting on one of the choir walls, depicting the Ascension and made by artist Pär Siregård in 1952.

The oldest items belonging to the church are the gilded silver chalice, which was made in Vä in 1530, and the early 16th-century triumphal cross. The pulpit was made in 1633 and is richly decorated with i.a. depictions of the Four Evangelists. The pews are largely modern although, unusually, their doors are preserved from the 17th century.
