= Tales of Pangea =

Studio album by Ana Alcaide
- Released: August 28, 2015
- Recorded: 2015
- Genre: World music
- Length: 41:28
- Label: ARC Music
- Producer: Ana Alcaide, Franki Raden

Ana Alcaide chronology
La Cantiga del Fuego (2012)	Tales of Pangea (2015)

Tales of Pangea is the fourth studio album by Ana Alcaide, released on August 28, 2015 and a collaboration with Gotrasawala Ensemble. All ten tracks of the album are in the Sundanese language.

== Track listing ==
Track listing
No.	Title	Writer(s)	Producer(s)	Length
1.	"Aguaribay - intro"	Rudi Rodexz, Iman Jimbot, Novi Aksmiranti	Ana Alcaide, Franki Raden	1:09
2.	"Aguaribay"	Rudi Rodexz, Iman Jimbot, Novi Aksmiranti	Ana Alcaide, Franki Raden	3:16
3.	"Kalbu Ngalagu"	Rudi Rodexz, Iman Jimbot, Novi Aksmiranti	Ana Alcaide, Franki Raden	4:34
4.	"Sono"	Rudi Rodexz, Iman Jimbot, Novi Aksmiranti	Ana Alcaide, Franki Raden	6:26
5.	"Madenda - intro"	Rudi Rodexz, Iman Jimbot, Novi Aksmiranti	Ana Alcaide, Franki Raden	2:28
6.	"Madenda"	Rudi Rodexz, Iman Jimbot, Novi Aksmiranti	Ana Alcaide, Franki Raden	3:51
7.	"Geber-Geber"	Rudi Rodexz, Iman Jimbot, Novi Aksmiranti	Ana Alcaide, Franki Raden	4:59
8.	"Madya"	Rudi Rodexz, Iman Jimbot, Novi Aksmiranti	Ana Alcaide, Franki Raden	4:57
9.	"Pajajaran"	Rudi Rodexz, Iman Jimbot, Novi Aksmiranti	Ana Alcaide, Franki Raden	4:44
10.	"Goyong"	Rudi Rodexz, Iman Jimbot, Novi Aksmiranti	Ana Alcaide, Franki Raden	4:32

== Personnel ==
Taken from the album's booklet:

- Ana Alcaide - vocals, nyckelharpa
- Rudi Rodexz - vocals, bansing
- Iman Jimbot - vocals, suling
- Novi Aksmiranti - vocals
- Riky Oktriyadi - selentem, kendang, fram drums
- Bill Cooley - psalterium, ud
- Rudini Zhiter - kecapi
- Ray Sandoval - guitar
- Rainer Seiferth - additional guitar
