= Lagga Church =

Church in Knivsta Municipality, Sweden

Coordinates: 59°47′48″N 17°50′24″E

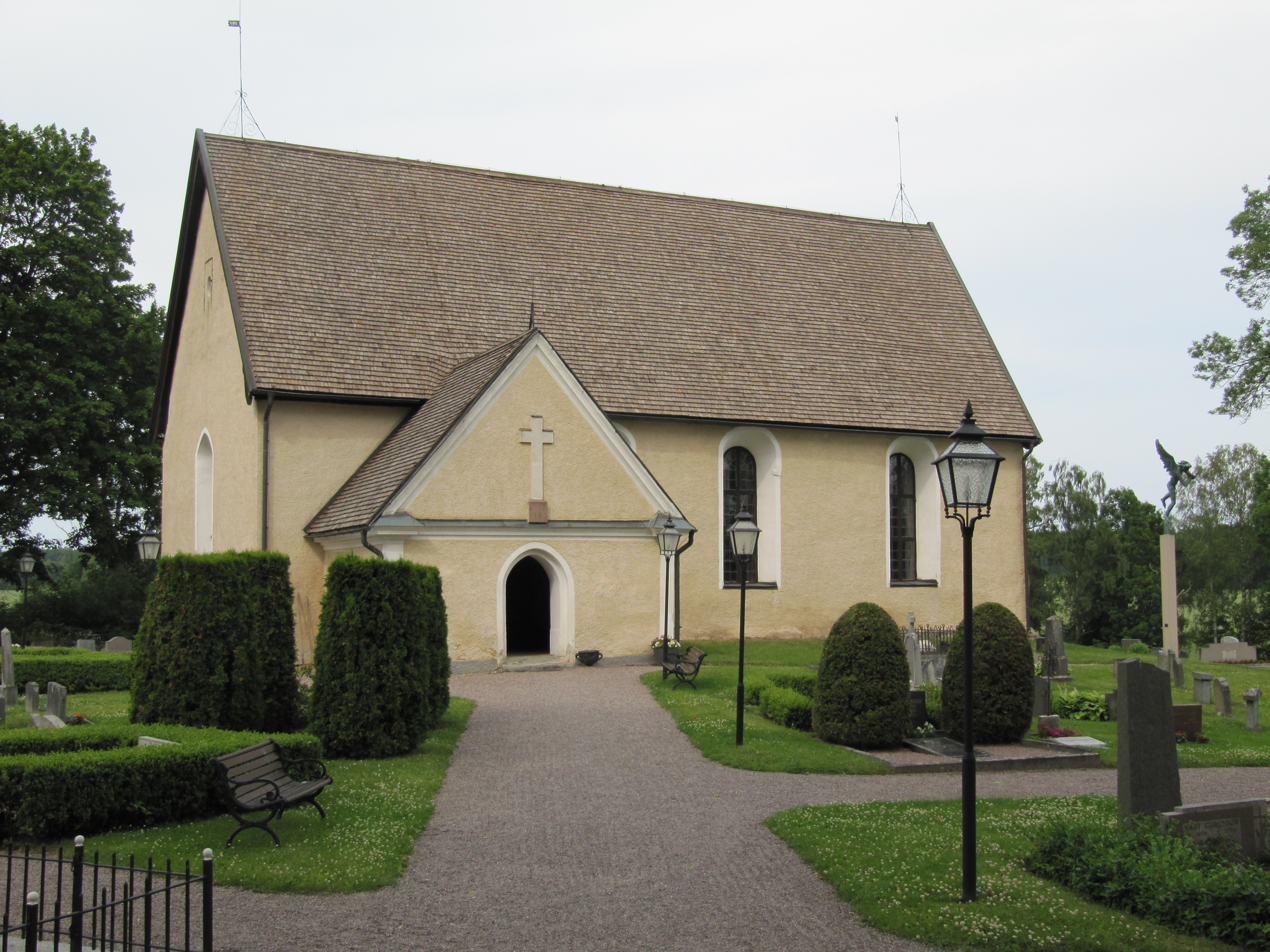
Lagga Church, external view

Lagga Church (Swedish: Lagga kyrka) is a medieval Lutheran church in the Knivsta Municipality in the province of Uppland, Sweden. It belongs to the Archdiocese of Uppsala.

== History and architecture ==
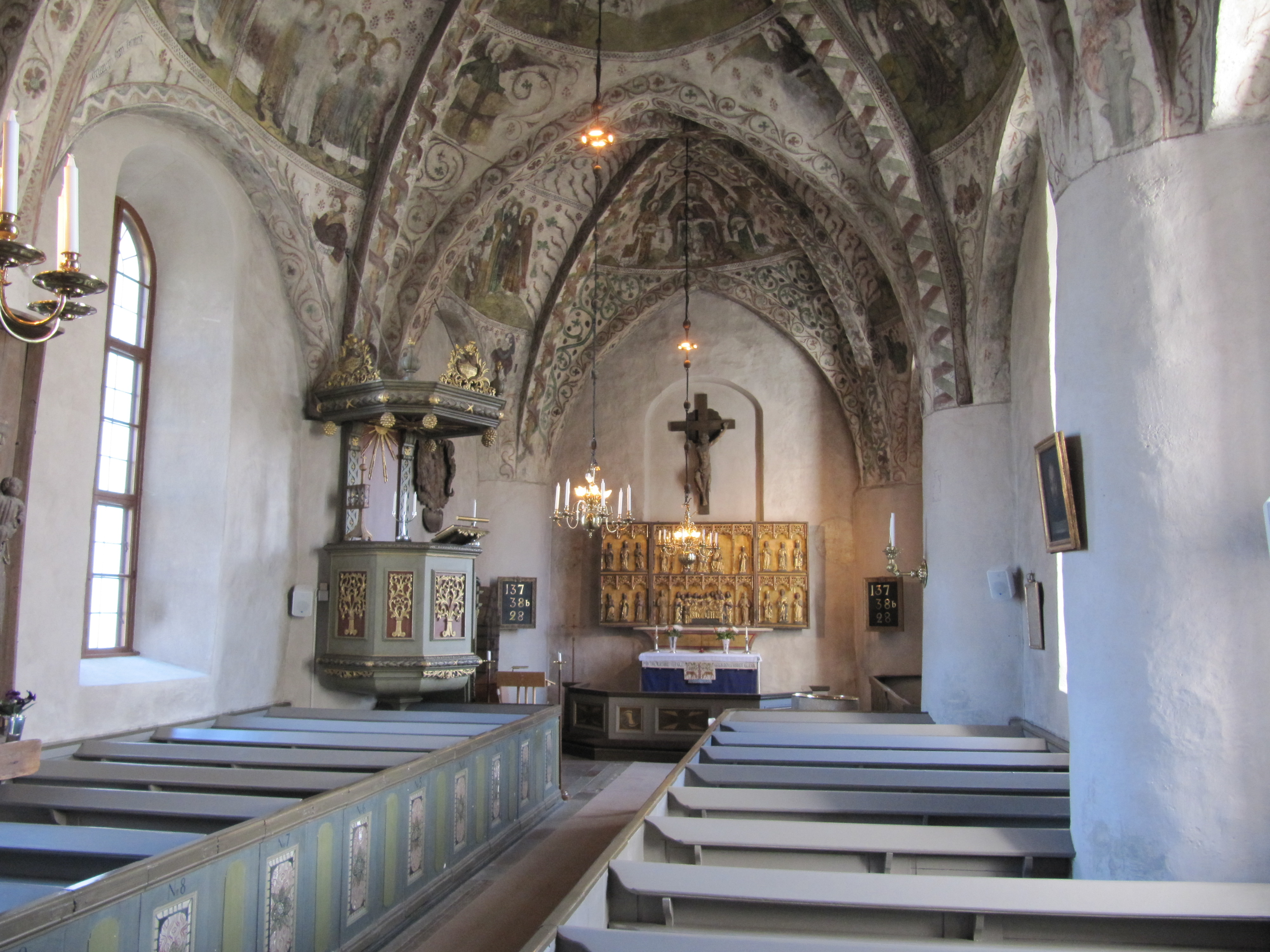
Interior view towards the choir

The currently visible church was built during the 14th century, but may have been preceded by an earlier building. During the 15th century, the church was expanded and rebuilt. The original wooden ceiling was replaced by the currently visible brick vaults. These were originally covered with frescos but these were replaced with another set of frescos, still visible, at the end of the same century. These frescos were made by the workshop or a follower of Albertus Pictor. Originally both the vaults and the walls were covered in frescos, but in 1747 the walls were painted white. During the 15th century the church porch was also added. The church has remained largely unaltered since. The windows were enlarged in 1815 and the gable of the church porch was decorated in 1870.

The church is rectangular in form, with the addition of the sacristy projecting from the church to the north and the church porch to the south. Its interior layout is that of an aisleless church. The building material of the church is fieldstone, externally whitewashed.

Among the church furnishings, the baptismal font made of sandstone is the oldest, from the 12th century and thus older than the present church. The altarpiece dates from the end of the 15th century and was made in Sweden, while the wooden triumphal cross dates from the first half of the 14th century. The large wooden tabernacle is also medieval, as is one of the chandeliers currently in the sacristy. The chandelier in the choir is a gift given to the church at the end of the 17th century by the nobleman Gustaf Svinhufvud. His burial coat of arms also hangs in the church. The pulpit dates from 1718 and was made by Carl Spaak.

South east of the church on the cemetery is a copy of a sculpture by Carl Milles.
