= Esse, Finland =

Former municipality of Finland, now part of Pedersöre

Esse Esse – Ähtävä
- Former municipality
- Esse kommun Ähtävän kunta
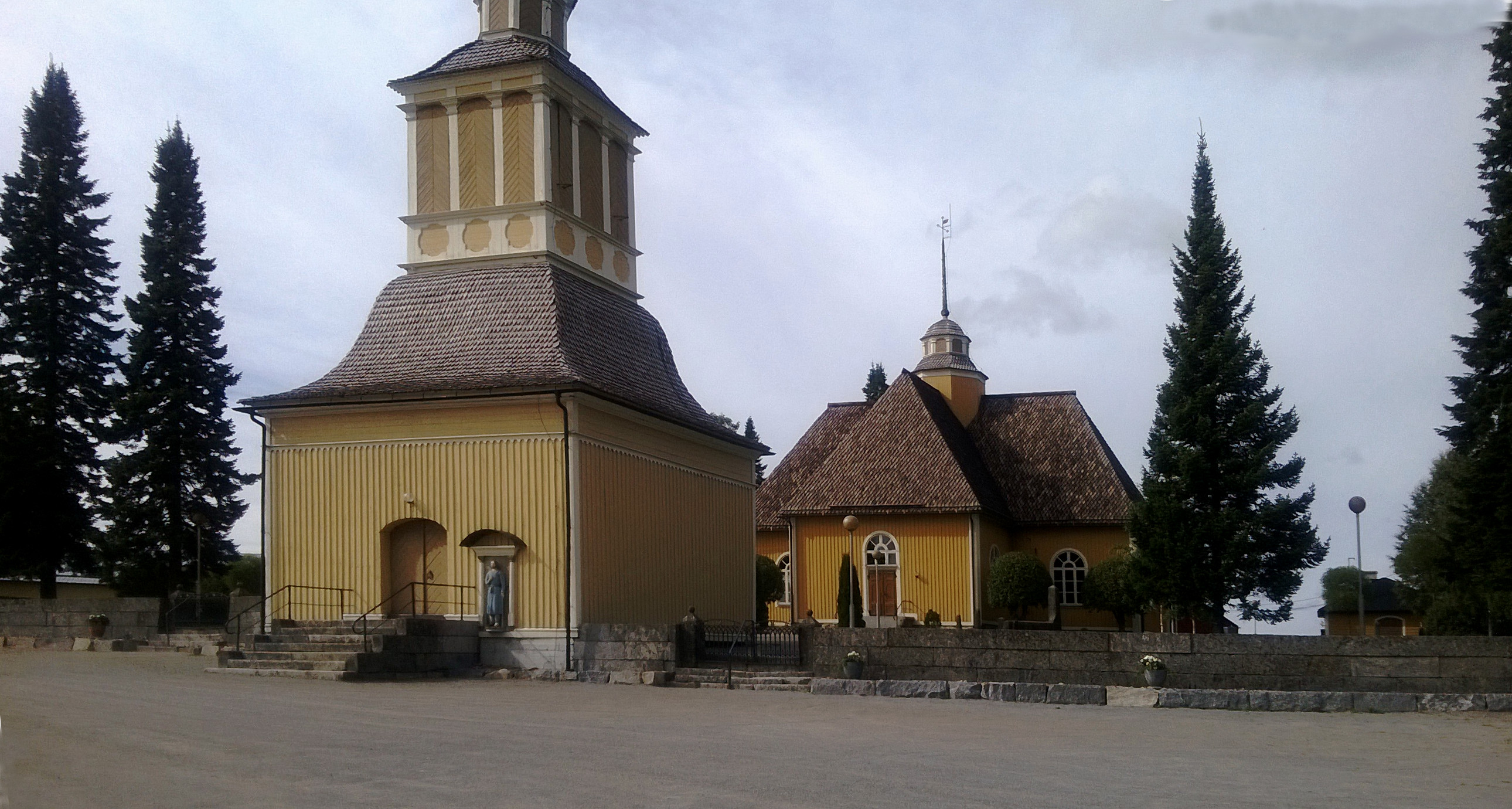
- Esse Church

- Coat of arms

- Location of Esse in Finland
- Coordinates: 63°35′N 023°03′E
- Country: Finland
- Region: Ostrobothnia
- Consolidated: 1977

Population (1976-12-31)
  - Total: 2,281
- Time zone: UTC+2 (EET)
  - Summer (DST): UTC+3 (EEST)
- Postal code: 68820

Esse (Finnish: Ähtävä) is a former municipality of Finland, now a village of Pedersöre. It has a population of about 3,000 people, of whom approximately 94% are Swedish-speaking Finns and the rest are Finnish-speaking. The village is in the northeast part of Pedersöre municipality.

Esse was consolidated to Pedersöre in 1977.

The river of Esse flows through the village. This river is one of the last places where the freshwater pearl mussel (Margaritifera margaritifera) can be found.

== Villages ==
Esse is divided into 4 smaller villages:

- Överesse, where the church is located
- Ytteresse
- Bäckby
- Lappfors

== History ==
The settlement gets its name from the river Esse/Ähtävänjoki. The name is related to that of Ähtäri, as the river originally began from the lake Ähtärinjärvi. Nowadays it begins from the lake Evijärvi. The original Finnish pronunciation was Ätsävä, in the nearby dialects pronounced Ässävä, which in turn is the origin of the Swedish name Esse. The current Finnish name became official in the late 19th century.

Esse has existed at least since 1488. It was a part of the Pedersöre parish, gaining its own church in 1732 and eventually becoming a separate parish and municipality in 1865. It remained independent until 1977, when it became a part of Pedersöre again together with neighboring Purmo.
