= Fürsteneck Castle =

Coordinates: 50°46′35″N 9°48′29″E

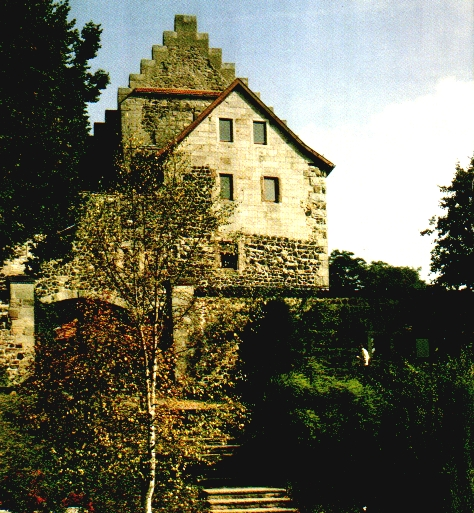
Fürsteneck Castle from the south

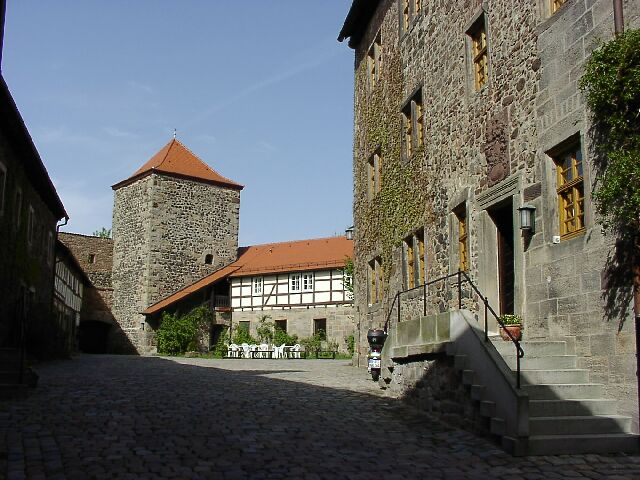
Inner ward of the castle

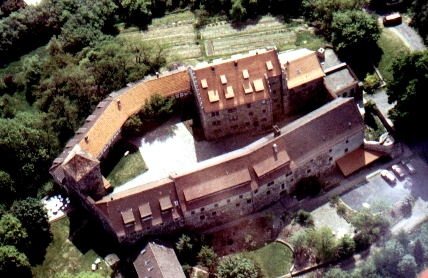
Aerial view of the castle

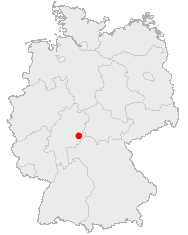
Location of Fürsteneck Castle in Germany

Fürsteneck Castle (German: Burg Fürsteneck) is a castle, situated in central Germany between Fulda and Bad Hersfeld. It belongs to the commune of Eiterfeld. The castle is at an elevation of 406 metres on a small plateau.

== History ==
Fürsteneck Castle belonged to the monastery of Fulda. The first written mention of it dates to 1309, but it might have been built one or two hundred years before. After secularization in 1802, it became the property of the German state of Hesse.

== Akademie Burg Fürsteneck ==
Since 1952 the castle has been used as an academy for vocational and cultural continuing education. It was rebuilt by the architect Otto Bartning. Each year about 4,000 participants take part in one of nearly 200 courses, with 15,000 overnight stays.

== Sources ==
- August Straub. Burgen und Schlösser im Hessenland. Melsungen: Bernecker, 1976. OCLC 256897347 (in German)
- August Weber. Die Geschichte des Kreises Hünfeld. Fulda: Parzeller, 1960. OCLC 36715969 (in German)
- Rudolf Christl et al. 1150 Jahre Dorf und Markt Eiterfeld. Amt und Gericht Fürsteneck. 845–1995. Eiterfeld, 1995. OCLC 174013677 (in German)
