= Tages discography =

Cataloguing of published recordings by Tages

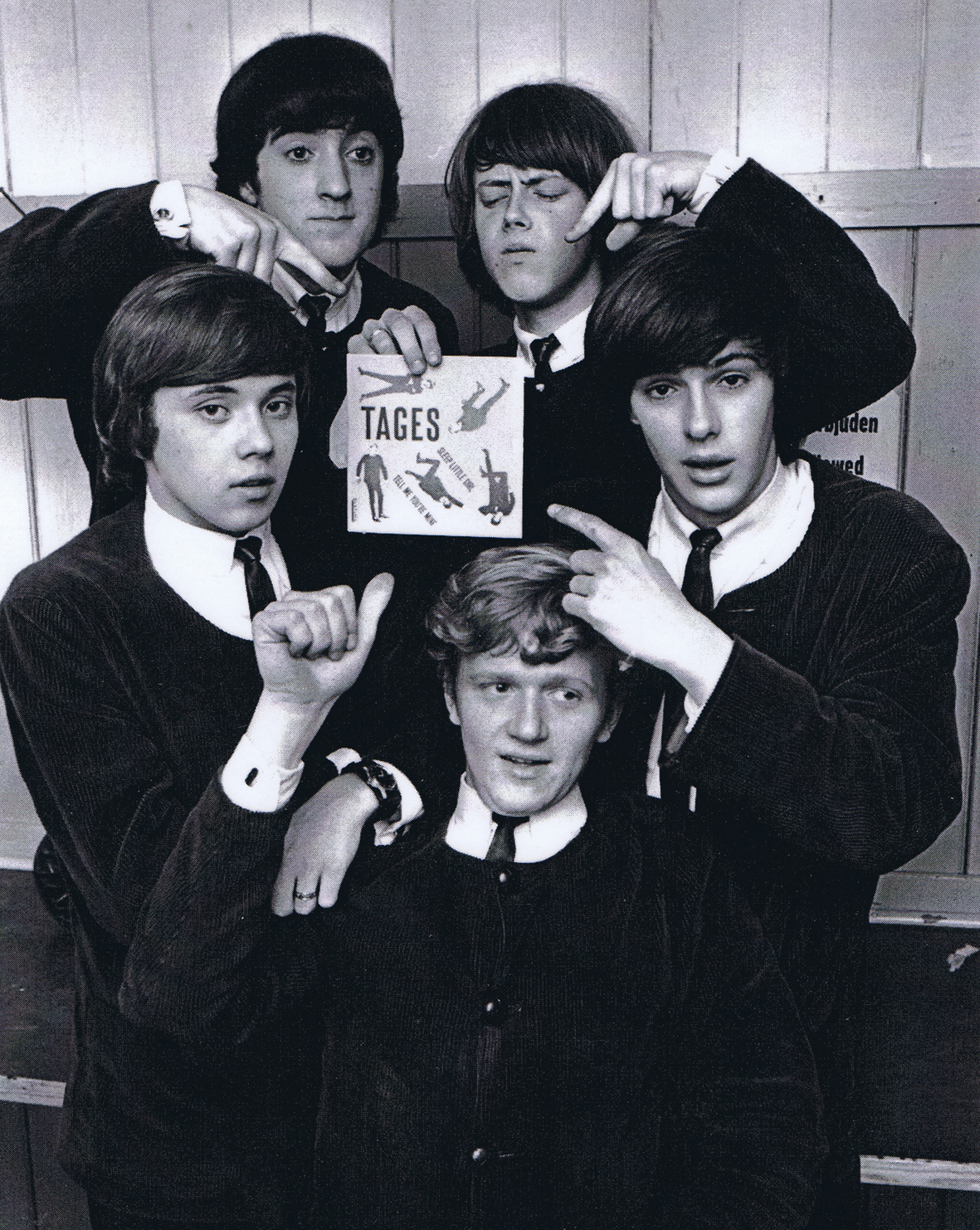
- Tages posing with a copy of their debut single "Sleep Little Girl" (1964)
- Studio albums: 6
- EPs: 6
- Live albums: 1
- Compilation albums: 16
- Singles: 30

Tages were a Swedish rock band from Gothenburg formed in 1963 by vocalist Tommy Blom, rhythm guitarist Danne Larsson, lead guitarist Anders Töpel, bass guitarist Göran Lagerberg and drummer Freddie Skantze. During their seven year tenure, they released six studio albums, three compilation albums, five extended plays and 26 singles in Sweden. Between November 1964 and April 1968, Tages were considered one of the four most popular bands in Sweden, (Note: Together with the Hep Stars, Ola and the Janglers and the Shanes) with 13 of their singles reaching the top 10 of the national record chart Tio i Topp including two number one singles. (Note: Tages placed an additional five singles in the top 20.) The band also released a string of commercially successful studio albums, with two of them, Tages (1965) and Tages 2 (1966), selling over 10,000 copies each in Sweden, enough for them to be certified gold. Towards the end of the 1960s, Tages' popularity started diminishing, and they charted their final top 10 single in April 1968. Lead vocalist Blom left the band at the end of their folkpark tour in August 1968. The group continued on as a quartet, with the group's sixth studio album and final five singles being released under the name Blond, a name which was chosen by the band's management who believed it to be more internationally viable. They broke up during the summer of 1970 after several personnel changes.

Tages' first 10 singles and three studio albums were released in Sweden by Platina Records, an independent record label founded by Evert Jakobsson. The band had signed a contract with the label in September 1964. Platina was distributed by EMI Records starting in 1965, causing singles by Tages released in the UK during this time period to appear on several EMI sublabels, including Columbia and His Master's Voice. Tages founded their own publishing company, Segat AB, during the spring of 1966, (Note: The company name is an anadrome; it is "Tages" spelled backwards.) which ensured that "income reached the right [band members'] pockets", contrary to many other publishing companies during the 1960s. Platina's contract with Tages expired on New Year's Day 1967, upon which they opted to sign a contract with Parlophone instead. This caused Jakobsson to issue archival material by Tages on Platina concurrently to their new releases on Parlophone in an act of retaliation. In preparation for a potential international breakthrough, Tages' new manager Richard-Reese Edwards got the band signed to Fontana Records, negotiating an advance of $50,000 ($428,721 in 2024), a sum previously unheard of by a Swedish pop group.

Starting with two unauthorized albums compiled by Jakobsson during the 1960s, Tages' music has been collected on several compilation albums. As the band's masters were owned by three separate record labels, the band's early compilation albums were restricted to the material each label had the rights to. In 1983, Jakobsson licensed an album's worth of his Tages Platina masters to EMI, who were putting together the compilation album Tages, 1964-68! Later during the 1980s, Sven-Åke Peterson of EMI negotiated with Jakobsson, purchasing the masters from him. In 1994, the 3-CD career-spanning box set This One's For You was released, containing almost every recording by Tages under that name. The Blond recordings are still owned by Universal Music Group, who issued all of their material with the band on the 2003 reissue of The Lilac Years.

== Studio albums ==
=== Studio albums ===
List of studio albums with selected chart positions
| Year | Title | Album details | Peak chart positions | |
| Year | Title | Swedish release (Note: Although Tages (1965) and Tages 2 (1966) sold gold in Sweden, neither of them charted as Kvällstoppen was largely aimed at single releases during the mid-1960s.) | NOR (Note: VG-lista published its first album chart on 1 January 1967.) | FIN |
|---|---|---|---|---|
| 1965 | Tages | Released: 3 November 1965; Label: Platina (PALP 3001) (Note: Tages' debut album was reissued with a new catalogue number (PBLP 5001).) | × | 3 |
| 1966 | Tages 2 (Note: The album has been known as both Tages 2, and simply 2.) | Released: 4 August 1966; Label: Platina (PALP 3002) | × | — |
| 1966 | Extra Extra | Released: 28 November 1966; Label: Platina (PALP 3003) | 20 | — |
| 1967 | Contrast | Released: 28 April 1967; Label: Parlophone (PMCS 313) | — | — |
| 1967 | Studio | Released: 4 December 1967; Label: Parlophone (PMCS 316) | — | — |
| 1969 | The Lilac Years (Note: As Blond) | Released: 17 October 1969; Label: Fontana (881 015 TY) | — | — |
"—" denotes releases that did not chart or were not released in that territory. "×" denotes the chart did not exist yet.

=== Live albums ===
List of live albums
| Year | Title | Album details |
|---|---|---|
| 1999 | Live At Last (Note: Recorded live on 11 November 1965 at Radiohuset, Stockholm and 9 August 1966 for Opopoppa on Sveriges Radio P3) | Released: June 1993; Label: Secret Room (TACD 6001) |

=== Compilation albums ===
List of compilation albums with selected chart positions and certifications
| Decade | Title | Album details | Peak chart positions |
| Decade | Title | Album details | SWE |
|---|---|---|---|
| 1960s | The Best Of Tages (Note: Unauthorized release by Platina Records after Tages signed with Parlophone Records in January 1967) | Released: August 1967; Label: Platina (PALP 3005) (Note: The Best of Tages was reissued with a new catalogue number (PBLP 5002).) | — |
| 1960s | Forget Him | Released: 28 May 1968; Label: Platina (PALP 3007) | — |
| 1960s | Good Old Tages | Released: February 1969; Label: Odeon (4E054-34002) | — |
| 1970s | Tages Favoritter | Released: 1974 (Note: Danish-only release); Label: EMI (6C 05435159) | × |
| 1980s | Tages, 1964-68! (Note: Released as part of the EMI compilation series A-Sidor, Några B-Sidor, LP-Spår & Lite Annat! which included albums by Hep Stars, Ola and the Janglers and the Shanes) | Released: 25 March 1983; Label: Parlophone (7C 138-35954) | — |
| 1980s | Tages Bästa! (Note: Cassette-only release.) | Released: 1983; Label: EMI (CMC 506) | — |
| 1990s | Hep Stars! Tages! Shanes! (Note: Shared compilation album with tracks by Tages, Hep Stars and the Shanes) | Released: 1991; Label: EMI (CMCD 6025) | — |
| 1990s | This One's For You! (Note: This One's For You! is a box set containing 3 CDs and a booklet. The CDs were later released individually as Don't Turn Your Back (1964–1966), In My Dreams (1966) and Fantasy Island (1967–1968).) | Released: 28 November 1994; Label: EMI (4751382) | — |
| 1990s | Don't Turn Your Back | Released: 28 November 1994; Label: EMI (7243 4751392 3) | — |
| 1990s | In My Dreams | Released: 28 November 1994; Label: EMI (7243 4751402 9) | — |
| 1990s | Fantasy Island | Released: 28 November 1994; Label: EMI (7243 4751412 8) | — |
| 1990s | Tages Bästa | Released: 21 October 1998; Label: EMI (CMCD6200) | — |
| 2000s | The Collection (Note: Netherlands-only release) | Released: 2001; Label: Disky (SSI 640812) | × |
| 2000s | Diamanter (Note: Part of EMI Sweden's reissue series Diamanter) | Released: 22 January 2004; Label: EMI (7243 5 96160 2 5) | — |
| 2010s | Original Album Serien (Note: Original Album Serien is a box set compiling Tages' five first studio albums.) | Released: 17 August 2011; Label: Capitol (50999 0 29854 2 8) | 53 |
| 2010s | Go! The Complete Singles | Released: 25 September 2015; Label: RPM (WRETRO D970) | — |
"—" denotes releases that did not chart. "x" denotes album not released in that territory.

== EPs ==
List of Swedish EPs with selected chart positions
| Year | Title | EP details | Peak chart positions |
| Year | Title | EP details | SWE (Kvällstoppen) |
|---|---|---|---|
| 1965 | Tages | Released: 4 June 1965; Label: Platina (PAEP 2001) | 2 (Note: The EP's lead single "Don't Turn Your Back" reached number two on Kvällstoppen.) |
| 1965 | Sleep Little Girl | Released: 30 August 1966; Label: Platina (PAEP 2001) | 3 (Note: The EP's lead single "Sleep Little Girl" reached number three on Kvällstoppen.) |
| 1967 | Tages-Hits Vol. 1 (Note: Unauthorized release by Platina Records after Tages signed with Parlophone Records in January 1967) | Released: August 1967; Label: Platina (PAEP 2005) | 3 |
| 1967 | Tages-Hits Vol. 2 | Released: August 1967; Label: Platina (PAEP 2006) | 1 (Note: The EP's lead single "In My Dreams" reached number one on Kvällstoppen.) |
| 1967 | Tages-Hits Vol. 3 | Released: August 1967; Label: Platina (PAEP 2007) | 1 (Note: The EP's lead single "Miss Mac Baren" reached number one on Kvällstoppen.) |
| 2012 | Live And Jealous (Note: Bonus EP that accompanied the book Boken om Tages: Från Avenyn till Abbey Road. Contains two live performances recorded on 11 November 1965 and two studio recordings that had appeared on Tages 2 (1966) and Studio (1967), respectively.) | Released: 13 December 2012; Label: Premium (PRE 022) | — |
"—" denotes releases that did not chart.

== Singles ==
List of singles, with selected chart positions and certifications
| Year | Single details (Note: Most of Tages' Swedish single pressings were exported across the Nordic countries, thus only pressings stemming from different countries will be noted.) | Peak chart positions | | | | Album or EP |
| Year | Single details | SWE (Kvällstoppen) | SWE (Tio i Topp) | FIN | DEN | Album or EP |
|---|---|---|---|---|---|---|
| 1964 | "Sleep Little Girl" b/w "Tell Me You're Mine": Released: 16 October 1964 (SE) (Note: Tages re-recorded "Sleep Little Girl" three times; the second recording was issued on a re-pressing of the single in January 1965.); Label: Platina (PA 102) | 3 | 1 | — | — | non-album single (Note: "Sleep Little Girl" was eventually re-recorded for the album Tages.) |
| 1965 | "I Should Be Glad" b/w "I Cry": Released: 15 February 1965 (SE) (Note: Re-issued in November 1965); Label: Platina (PA 103) | 2 | 2 | 37 | — | non-album single |
| 1965 | "Don't Turn Your Back" b/w "Hound Dog" (from Tages): Released: 14 May 1965 (SE); Label: Platina (PA 104) | 2 | 2 | — | — | Tages (EP) |
| 1965 | "The One for You" b/w "I Got My Mojo Working" (from Tages): Released: 15 August 1965 (SE); Label: Platina (PA 105) | 6 | 2 | — | — | Tages (album) |
| 1965 | "Bloodhound" b/w "Whatcha Gonna Do About It": Released: 19 November 1965 (SE) (Note: "Baldheaded Lena" debuted on the Kvällstoppen chart on June 28, 1966.); Label: Platina (PA 109) | 3 | 6 | 40 | — | Tages (album) |
| 1966 | "So Many Girls" b/w "I'm Mad": Released: 11 February 1966 (SE), (Note: Also released in Finland in 1966) 11 March 1966 (UK); Label: Platina (PA 115), His Master's Voice (POP 1515) | 5 | 4 | — | — | non-album single |
| 1966 | "I'll Be Doggone" b/w "Hitch Hike": Released: 18 May 1966 (SE); Label: Platina (PA 121) | 10 | 7 | — | — | non-album single |
| 1966 | "I'm The Man You'll Be Lookin' For" b/w "Leaving Here" (from Tages 2): Released: June 1966 (NO) (Note: Norwegian-only release); Label: His Master's Voice (AL 6137) | x | x | x | x | non-album single (Note: "The Man You'll Be Looking For" was initially issued in Sweden on a free flexi disc that came with the 2 March 1966 issue of teen magazine Bildjournalen.) |
| 1966 | "In My Dreams" b/w "Leaving Here" (from Tages 2): Released: 16 July 1966 (SE) (Note: Also issued in the Netherlands in September 1966, West Germany in October 1966, and in Norway with "Dirty Mind" on the B-side in September 1966); Label: Platina (PA 122) | 1 | 1 | 39 | — | Tages 2 |
| 1966 | "Crazy 'Bout My Baby" b/w "In My Dreams" (UK), "Go" (SE) (Both from Tages 2): Released: 7 October 1966 (UK), 21 October 1966 (SE) (Note: Also released in Norway and Finland in November 1966); Label: Columbia (DB 8019), Platina (PA 125) | 16 | 15 | — | — | Tages 2 |
| 1966 | "Miss Mac Baren" b/w "Get Up An' Get Goin'" (from Extra Extra): Released: 30 November 1966 (SE) (Note: Also released in Finland in November 1966 and Norway in March 1967); Label: Platina (PA 130) | 1 | 4 | — | — | non-album single |
1967
| 1967 | "Secret Room" b/w "Friday on My Mind" (from Extra Extra): Released: 16 January 1967 (SE) (Note: Unauthorized release by Platina Records after Tages signed with Parlophone Records in January 1967) (Note: Also released in Norway in February 1967); Label: Platina (PA 131) | — | — | x | x | Extra Extra |
| 1967 | " Every Raindrop Means A Lot" b/w "Look What You Get": Released: 15 February 1967 (SE) (Note: Also released in Finland in April 1967 and Norway in June 1967); Label: Parlophone (SD 6004) | 4 | 2 | — | — | Contrast |
| 1967 | "I'm Going Out" b/w "Fuzzy Patterns" (from Contrast): Released: 14 April 1967 (SE) (Note: Also released in Denmark in August 1967 and Norway in September 1967); Label: Parlophone (SD 6005) | 3 | 2 | — | 4 | Contrast |
| 1967 | "Gone Too Far" b/w "Understanding" (from Extra Extra): Released: 28 April 1967 (SE); Label: Platina (PA 134) | — | — | x | x | Extra Extra |
| 1967 | "She's Having A Baby Now" b/w "Sister's Got A Boyfriend" (from Contrast): Released: June 1967 (SE) (Note: Also released in Norway in September 1967); Label: Parlophone (SD 6009) | — | — | — | — | Studio |
| 1967 | "One Red, One Yellow, One Blue" b/w "True Fine Woman" (from Extra Extra): Released: July 1967 (SE); Label: Platina (PA 139) | — | — | x | x | Extra Extra |
| 1967 | "Treat Her Like A Lady" b/w "Wanting" (from Contrast): Released: 26 September 1967 (SE), (Note: Also released in Denmark in October 1967, Norway in February 1968 and in West Germany with "Like a Woman" on the B-side in March 1968) 6 October 1967 (UK); Label: Parlophone (SD 6011) | 7 | 3 | — | 6 | non-album single |
| 1967 | "Dancing in the Street" b/w "Those Rumours" (from Tages 2): Released: 14 May 1965 (SE) (Note: Also released in Norway in November 1967); Label: Platina (PA 141) | — | 15 | x | x | Tages 2 |
| 1967 | "Mohair Sam" b/w "Ride Your Pony" (from Extra Extra): Released: December 1967 (SE); Label: Platina (PA 145) | — | — | x | x | Extra Extra |
1968
| 1968 | "There's a Blind Man Playin' Fiddle in the Street" b/w "Like a Woman" (from Studio): Released: 2 February 1968 (SE), (Note: Also released in Denmark and Finland in February 1968) 7 June 1968 (UK) (Note: Also released in the US in November 1968.); Label: Parlophone (SD 6024) | — | 10 | — | 20 | non-album single |
| 1968 | "Fantasy Island" b/w "To Be Free": Released: 21 May 1968 (SE) (Note: Also released in Denmark in 1968); Label: Parlophone (SD 6036) | — | 14 | — | — | non-album single |
| 1968 | "Doctor Feel-Good" b/w "Dimples" (from Tages): Released: June 1968 (SE); Label: Platina (PA 149) | x | x | x | x | Tages (album) |
| 1968 | "House of Soul Hill" b/w "Sister's Got a Boyfriend" (from Contrast): Released: June 1968 (EU) (Note: Released in West Germany, Switzerland, Austria and the Netherlands); Label: Odeon (O 23671) | x | x | x | x | Contrast |
| 1968 | "I Read You Like an Open Book" b/w "Halcyon Days": Released: October 1968 (SE), 11 October 1968 (UK) (Note: On the UK release of the single, "Halcyon Days" is the designated A-side.) | — | — | — | — | non-album single |
1969
| 1969 | "I Wake Up and Call" (Note: As Blond) b/w "(I Will Bring You) Flowers in the Morning" (UK), "The Girl I Once Had" (SE) (Both from The Lilac Years): Released: 20 June 1969 (UK), (Note: Also released in Norway and the Netherlands) 29 July 1969 (SE); Label: Fontana (TF 1040) | — | 14 | — | — | The Lilac Years |
| 1969 | "The Lilac Years (de Sålde Sina Hemman)" (Note: As Blond) b/w "Six White Horses" (from The Lilac Years): Released: 17 October 1969 (SE); Label: Fontana (TF 272.282) | — | — | — | — | The Lilac Years |
| 1969 | "Deep Inside My Heart" (Note: As Blond) b/w "(I Will Bring You) Flowers In The Morning" (from The Lilac Years): Released: October 1969 (US); Label: Platina (F-1673) | x | x | x | x | The Lilac Years |
| 1969 | "I Pick Up The Bus" (Note: As Blond) b/w "Six White Horses" (from The Lilac Years): Released: June 1968 (AR); Label: Philips (6089001) | x | x | x | x | The Lilac Years |
| 1970 | "Lost Child" (Note: As Blond) b/w "How Can I Pray If I Don't Believe (The Elephant)": Released: July 1970 (SE); Label: Fontana (6089.002) | — | — | — | — | non-album single |
"—" denotes releases that did not chart. "x" denotes single not released in that territory.

== See also ==
- List of songs recorded by Tages
