= Studio (album) =

Studio album by Tages
- Released: 4 December 1967
- Recorded: 17 April – 16 November 1967
- Studio: EMI, London; Europafilm, Stockholm
- Genre: Baroque pop; psychedelic folk; vispop
- Length: 30:37
- Label: Parlophone
- Producer: Anders Henriksson (Note: Despite not being credited upon original release in 1967, Ron Richards, the Hollies' producer, co-produced the two tracks recorded at EMI Studios in London, which were engineered by the technicians Ken Scott and Jeff Jarrat.)

Tages chronology
Contrast (1967)	Studio (1967)	The Lilac Years (1969)

Singles from Studio
- 1. "She's Having a Baby Now" Released: June 1967

Studio is the fifth and final studio album by the Swedish rock band Tages, released on 4 December 1967 on Parlophone in Sweden. Following the success of their album Contrast, Tages began working on their follow-up to it. Hampered by a long summer tour, the album was largely recorded between October and November 1967 with sessions spanning back to April. It was primarily recorded at Europafilm Studios in Bromma, Stockholm with Anders Henriksson producing. The band took a break in recording the album in October for a tour of England organized by Parlophone, which allowed them access to EMI Studios in London, where two of the album's tracks were recorded. One single was released from the album, "She's Having a Baby Now" and the sessions also produced the non-album single "Treat Her Like a Lady".

Studio was largely conceived and written by bassist Göran Lagerberg and producer Henriksson, but features songwriting credits from all band members, particularly lead vocalist Tommy Blom and rhythm guitarist Danne Larsson. It was largely written at Henriksson's home in Tureberg and at his parents' summer cottage in Tällberg, Dalarna. Musically, it experiments with the psychedelia found on Tages' previous two albums Extra Extra and Contrast, but expands on it by incorporating elements of their Scandinavian roots through Nordic and Swedish folk music, creating an unprecedented fusion. Several songs on the album have controversial lyrical content. Studio techniques include backmasking on guitars and drums.

Studio was Tages' first album to be released with a gatefold cover, which depicts Tages' members during the recording process of the album. Upon original release for the Christmas rush, the album became an unexpected commercial failure as fans generally disliked the new direction the band took with the album. It was released along with a short film featuring the band, Dalamania, airing on Sveriges Television. Studio did receive positive reviews in the press, with many publications highlighting the inclusion of folk music and the production efforts of Henriksson. Largely ignored shortly after release, Studio started to receive a cult following during the 1980s and has seen retrospective critical acclaim. In 1997, it was ranked the 36th best Swedish album of all time by the Swedish Musicians' Union. It was the group's last album with Blom, and their last under the name Tages.

== Background ==
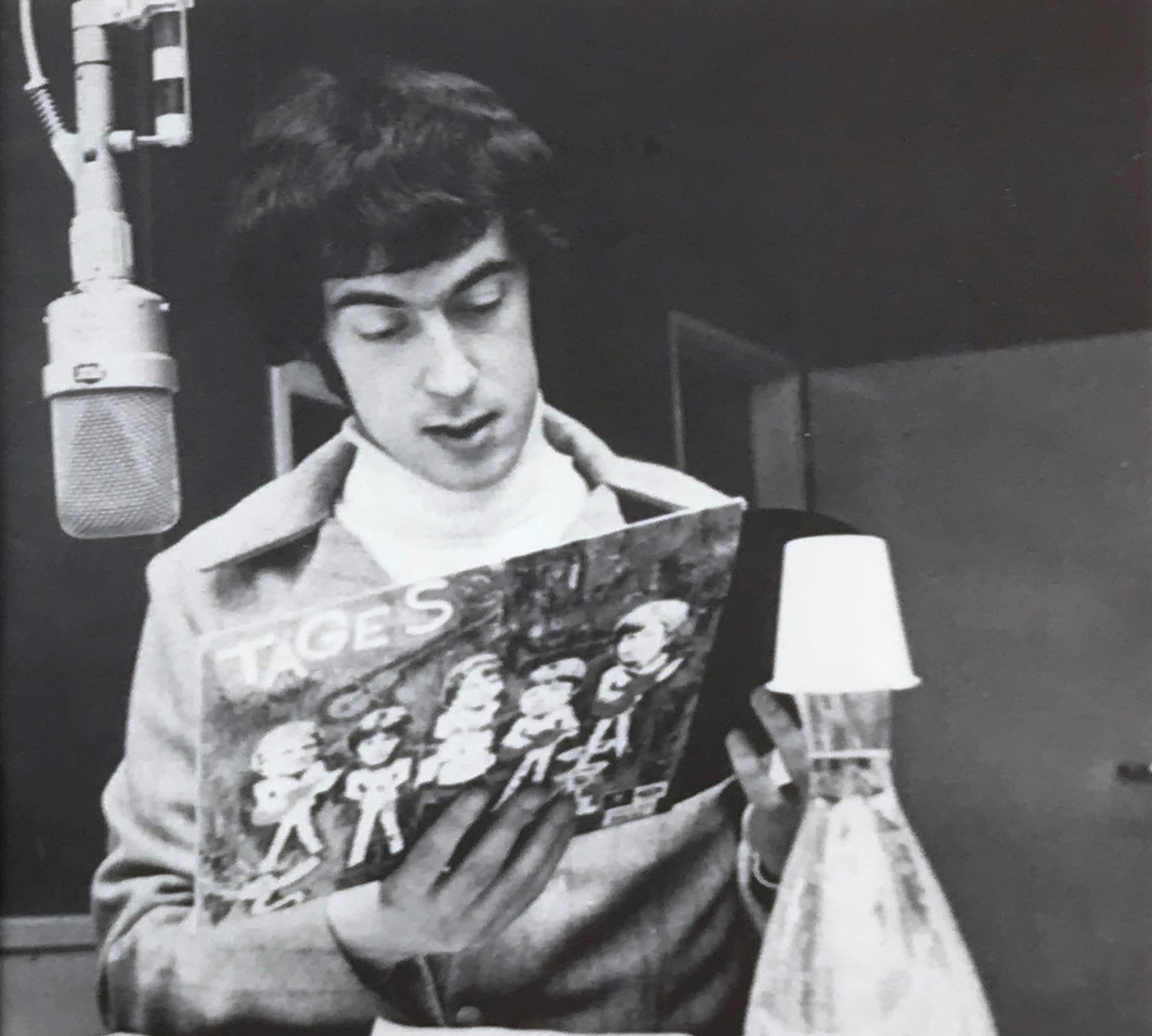
Roger Wallis reviewing Contrast for Sveriges Radio. Critics enjoyed the musical direction the band took with the album.

Tages' roots in folk music can be traced to their origins in 1963, when they formed as a skiffle group. The group's three first singles, "Sleep Little Girl" (1964), "I Should Be Glad" and "Don't Turn Your Back" (both 1965) all shared a sound of soft rock along with melodic folk rock. All three of these singles were successful on the two Swedish charts, Tio i Topp and Kvällstoppen. After seeing Howlin' Wolf and Lightnin' Hopkins live in Gothenburg, Tages had begun abandoning their folk roots in favour of a sound much more oriented toward rhythm and blues and hard rock, evident on their fourth single "The One for You" (1965). Their producer Anders Henriksson was key in this musical change. Henriksson had a history in producing a wide array of bands, including the Shanes whom saw hits due to his production work. The group members also wanted to leave their earlier sound due to insecurity in their songwriting along with the fact that "Sleep Little Girl" was ravaged in the Swedish press.

Tages' single releases from 1966 marked a return to folk music while also retaining their hard-edged sound established by "The One for You". Their first single release of 1966, "So Many Girls", composed by bassist Göran Lagerberg, was the first in which the band were inspired by Swedish folk music. In August of that year, the band's second studio album, Tages 2, was released. It features a songs with influences from folk along with rhythm and blues as well as "In My Dreams", which heavily features wind instruments. "In My Dreams" was released as a single and was one of the earliest examples where folk music was integrated in a song by a commercially successful pop band in Sweden. (Note: "In My Dreams" was Tages' most commercially successful recording, reaching number one on both Tio i Topp and Kvällstoppen.)

A major reason for Tages' sound during this time was that Tages' contract with the Gothenburg-based label Platina Records had expired on New Year's Eve 1966, which allowed the band to move on to Parlophone. (Note: According to rhythm guitarist Danne Larsson, Parlophone gave the band access to "better financial resources, studio time and a wider promotion, both nationally and internationally". Additionally, this allowed the band to become "label-mates" with the Beatles, who Tages looked up to.) The sound also resulted from Tages' willingness to experiment in the studio, largely made possible by Henriksson. In addition to producing, Henriksson wrote several tracks for Tages, including "You're too Incomprehensible", which appears on the band's third studio album Contrast, a song which Tages' biographer Kjell Wiremark considers one of the first "true psychedelic works" in Sweden. Lagerberg and Henriksson worked as a songwriting duo, where Lagerberg wrote most of the lyrical content and Henriksson composed the music. Wiremark attributes the band's sound to drummer Lasse Svensson, who joined the band during the early recording sessions for Contrast.

According to Lagerberg, the recording and release of Studio, Tages' fourth studio album, were entirely dependent on whether or not accompanying singles would become hits or not. In June 1967, Parlophone released "She's Having a Baby Now" as Tages' third single on that label, with "Sister's Got a Boyfriend" from Contrast on the B-side. It was Tages' biggest commercial failure since their 1966 release "Crazy 'Bout My Baby", as it failed to chart on both Tio i Topp and Kvällstoppen. Tages released the follow-up "Treat Her Like a Lady" with "Wanting" from Contrast on the B-side, on 26 September; it charted on both Swedish charts.

== Recording and production ==
We got all the studio time we wanted; suddenly we weren't working under the same stress as before.

— Danne Larsson (2012)

Work on Studio was sporadic across 1967, with most of it completed in the autumn. The single track "She's Having a Baby Now" was recorded at Europafilm in Stockholm, which was Tages' and Henriksson's preferred studio, during a nightly session between 17 and 18 April 1967, before Contrast was released. The technician was Björn Almstedt, a veteran engineer and a personal favourite of Henriksson. The result was satisfactory enough that Almstedt was chosen as the record's engineer during all the recording sessions in Stockholm.

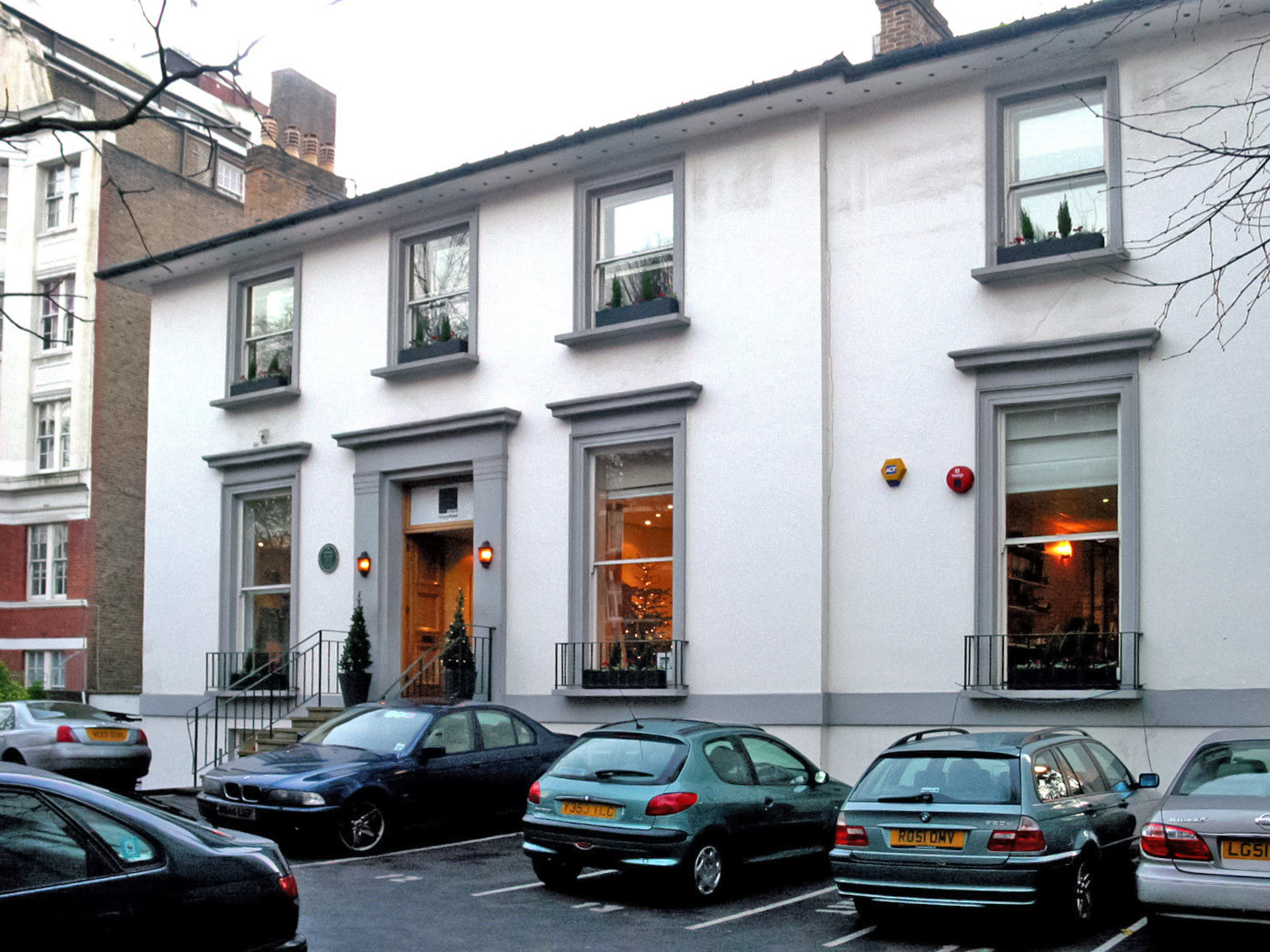
The tracks "Like a Woman" and "It's in a Dream" were cut at EMI Studios in London.

Almost immediately following the recording of "She's Having a Baby Now", Tages embarked on a tour of Sweden. Tages did not enter a studio during the entire summer, which was the most hectic part of the tour. (Note: The summer tours were the most hectic for Swedish bands, as the folkparks were generally only open during this season.) The next recording session occurred in August, and produced another song aimed for single release, "Treat Her Like a Lady", a cover of the Lesley Gore song. When the summer tour ended in August, Tages had a chance to incorporate and write new material into their repertoire. The first session aimed specifically at a new album release was held on 1 October at Europafilm, (Note: Pop albums in Sweden were aimed at the Christmas market, as they were expensive for the teenagers buying those records.) which was booked almost exclusively for Tages for a week, which was done to relieve band members from stress; no performances or tours were conducted during this week and the band members could come and go from the studio as they wished.

Their studio time at Europafilm lapsed on 8 October, with only a press conference on 7 October interrupting the recording sessions. At the press conference, Tages revealed that Parlophone had arranged work permits for the band in the United Kingdom, and the members flew to London on 9 October. They went on a three-week tour during which they attempted to have a breakthrough on the English market. After the tour, the band and Henriksson recorded at the EMI Studios (later Abbey Road Studios) in London. This was possible because Parlophone was a sublabel of EMI Records. Tages recorded two tracks, "Like a Woman" and "It's in a Dream", on 23–25 October. (Note: There is a common misconception that all tracks on Studio were recorded at EMI Studios.) According to Lagerberg, the band members were stressed in EMI's studio, feeling inferior to their British peers.

Tages returned to Sweden by the end of October and entered Europafilm on 11, 12, 14, and 16 November to finish the remainder of Studio's tracks. The recording sessions featured an unprecedented amount of session musicians in Swedish pop music at the time, primarily for songs which required string quartets or brass sections, which the Swedish Radio Symphony Orchestra and Lars Samuelson's Orchestra were hired to provide. In addition to producing the sessions, Henriksson, who was a multi-instrumentalist, played most keyboard instruments on the tracks, including piano, organ and the celesta.

== Songs and composition ==
=== Overview ===
Lagerberg and Henriksson wrote and rehearsed the majority of their contributions to Studio in the late summer of 1967. Henriksson's home in Tureberg, in Sollentuna, was initially used as a base for the duo's songwriting. Lagerberg would "crash on a horrible couch" which would keep him up at night, allowing him to focus on songwriting for Studio. Henriksson had lived in the Swedish province of Dalarna during his first few years and took great inspiration from staying there. He and Lagerberg spent an increasing amount of time in Henriksson's parents' summer cottage, located in the small village of Tällberg by the lake Siljan, all of which came to influence several songs on the album.

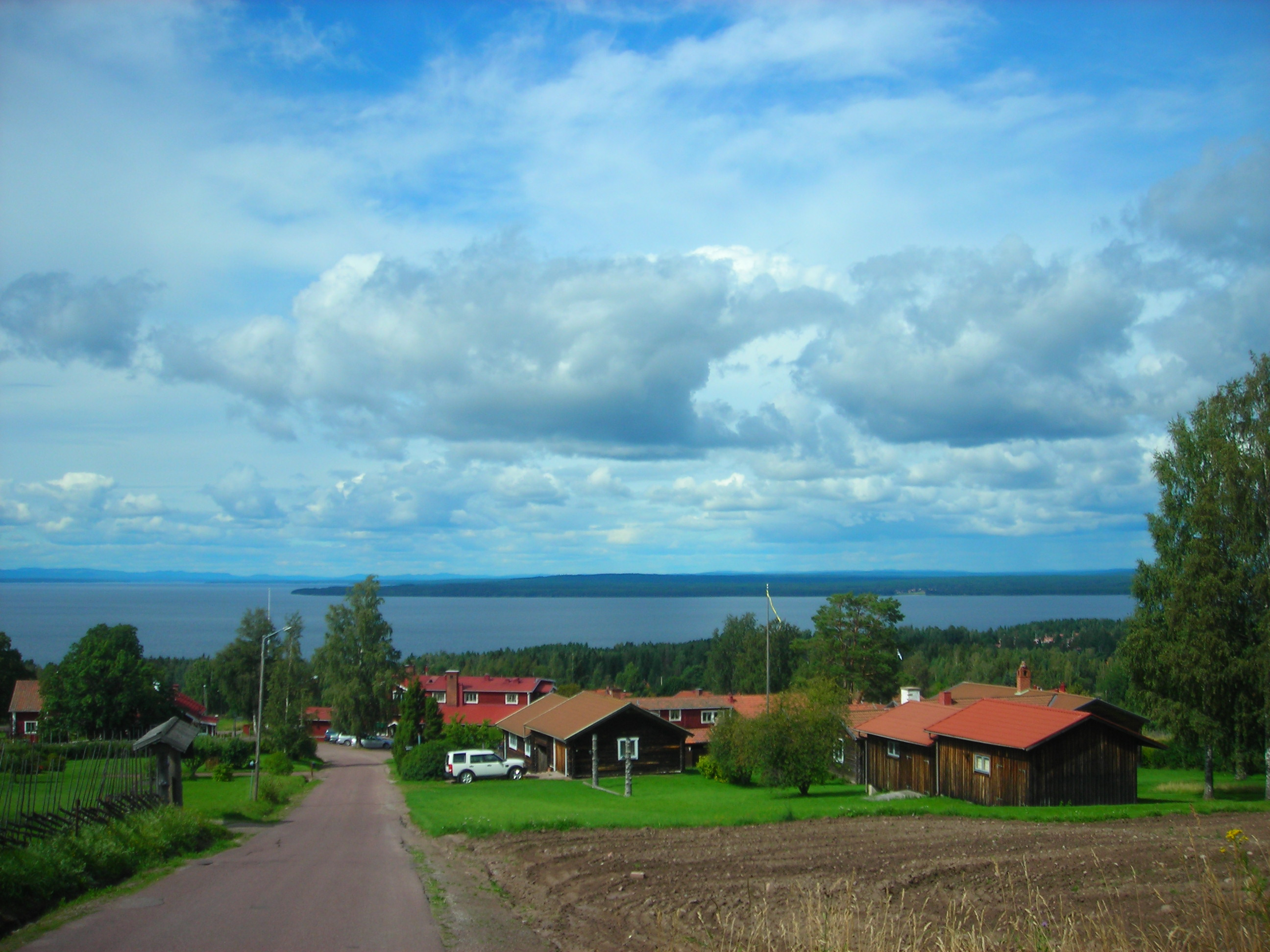
The Swedish province of Dalarna inspired the theme of the album.

According to vocalist Blom, tracks on Studio use instruments present in "ancient Swedish history", and generally used in genres not connected to pop music. Henriksson saw it as a tribute to the spelmän of Dalarna. Svensson ways the usage of Swedish folk music was a "gimmick which was the present [1967] trend", and that Tages refrained from using influences from India because of the Beatles doing it.

Folk instruments are present on about half of Studio's tracks. (Note: Some critics have used the term "folk rock" to describe the album.) The other material on the album, mostly the tracks not composed by Lagerberg and Henriksson, seek influences elsewhere which with the inclusion of brass and string instruments. As with their previous two albums, Extra Extra and Contrast, Studio showcases Tages experimenting with psychedelic sounds, including techniques such as backmasked electric guitar, a Leslie speaker used by lead guitarist Anders Töpel, reverberation and feedback. As was common in Swedish pop music at the time, Tages viewed lyrics as an afterthought to the music, because most Swedish teenagers buying the records had a limited grasp of English.

=== Side one ===
"Have You Seen Your Brother Lately"
"Have You Seen Your Brother Lately", the album opener, has been considered the group's prime example in their fusion of Swedish folk music and rock.

Studio opens with the song "Have You Seen Your Brother Lately". The name of the song came as an accident after Lagerberg misread the title of the Rolling Stones' song "Have You Seen Your Mother, Baby, Standing in the Shadow?" (1966). Henriksson found Lagerberg's error amusing enough to compose a melody around it.The song, which opens with a fade and folk instruments before Tages' members enter with their instruments, was meant to set the tone for the rest of the album. "It's My Life", which follows, bases its sound on a hard rock riff which complements the somewhat introspective lyrics by Lagerberg. The track has prominent vocal harmonies and a chorus where the backing vocalists sing in a counter-melody to Lagerberg's lead vocals. On the track Henriksson plays an accordion in the style of French bal-musette.

"Like a Woman" was composed by Lagerberg, Henriksson and rhythm guitarist Danne Larsson. The song was allegedly written during the night before the recording session as Tages did not have any other songs ready. Wiremark states that "Like a Woman" lyrically features Lagerberg singing about how a sixteen year old moves and loves like a woman. The midpoint of side one provides a change as the focus switches from songs written and sung by Lagerberg to songs written and sung by Blom. The first of these is "People Without Faces", which is mixed low and has a melody accompanied by a string quartet from the Swedish Radio Symphony Orchestra. The lyrics were personal for Blom, who was tired of his grandparents. The song makes references to an older generation with nothing better to do than "complaining on a television show".

"I Left My Shoes at Home" was written by Blom and Larsson. The song is about Blom as he sits in a park without shoes, because he had forgot his shoes under the table in his living room. It features a moody and abrasive piano opening line performed by Larsson. The band is accompanied on brass by Lasse Samuelson's Orchestra during the choruses, after which a "battle between strings and guitars", as Wiremark describes it, occurs during an instrumental break. Side one's closer, "She Is a Man", is the first song on Studio without the involvement of any band members, as it was written by Henriksson and the 19-year-old producer Bengt Palmers. (Note: On original release, Henriksson and Palmers are credited under the pseudonyms F. Akon and F. Zome, respectively.) Wiremark calls it the album's most "conventionally psychedelic song" due to the usage of backmasked guitar by Töpel. The song features two lead vocalists: Blom sings during the verses and Henriksson provides the falsetto lead during the chorus. "She Is a Man" is lyrically about a transvestite or a trans woman.

=== Side two ===
"Seeing With Love"
"Seeing With Love", is one of the band's more complex songs, which features several complex brass and vocal arrangements along with backmasking on the drums.

Side two opens with the song "Seeing with Love". It was largely written by Lagerberg but credited to the entire band because he thought the creative process in the studio made it a group composition. The song features some of Studio's more complex arrangements regarding both the brass performances and vocal harmonies, the latter of which have echo applied through a mechanical process. The song features session musician Janne Kling, who contributes the cornett, crumhorn and the Swedish folk instrument spilåpipa through multitracking. The song's ending features a performance on the fiddle mirroring the melody line. The following track, "Created by You", is the first and only composition not related to the band, having been written by Claes Dieden, guitarist of the band Science Poption, who gave Tages the song on 4 October 1967 during the recording of the programme Julgransplundring med Tages, a Christmas special on Sveriges Television (SVT). The ballad features sporadic appearances of a flute and Henriksson on celesta.

The following song, "What's the Time", was written by Blom and Larsson but sung by Lagerberg. The song deviates the most from the rest of Studio, as it is an upbeat soul-pop song which heavily features Lasse Samuelson's Orchestra playing brass instruments. The flute which persists during the instrumental break keeps it connected with the album's folk sound. The lyrics are about love from the perspective of a longing narrator. "It's in a Dream" was written by Lagerberg and Henriksson. The song is characterized by a piano riff performed by Henriksson, which repeats after the verses and choruses, and Töpel's lead guitar recorded through a Leslie speaker. Lyrically, the song tackles peace through metaphors involving Robin Hood, while alluding to child soldiers and war.

"She's Having a Baby Now" revolves around out-of-wedlock teenage pregnancy. Lead vocalist Blom describes the lyrics as "socially pornographic" and as criticism of family separations. Musically, the song was a group composition. It is largely fuelled by vocal harmonies and interchanging lead vocals by Lagerberg and Blom. The album closes with "The Old Man Wafwer", which is the only instrumental track Tages ever recorded. The composition is split into two section, one which uses an arrangement of brass instruments played by Lasse Samuelson's Orchestra which leads into a riff on the accordion played by Henriksson. The second part is based on musical improvisation and features Kling's flute playing throughout, while Svensson's drums have a major part in the arrangement. The title was taken from a man who lived on Vaverön, an island in the lake Siljan in Dalarna.

== Artwork and title ==
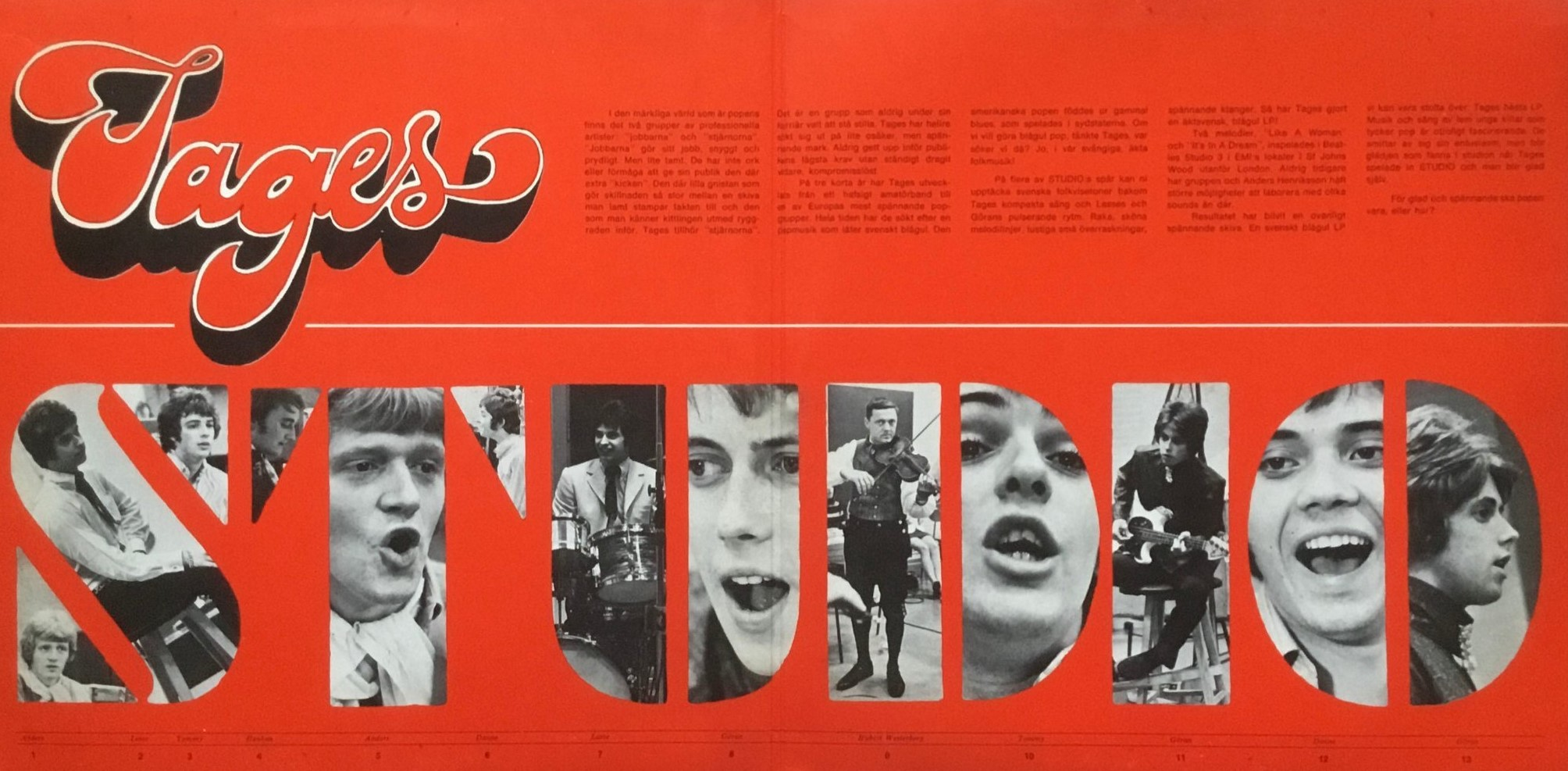
The gatefold inlay feature the band members superimposed over the album's title

The front and back cover photographs of Studio were taken during the same photo session. It is generally accepted that photographer Walter Hirsch took them and that they were shot in Gothenburg, but the location is disputed; according to Brandels and Wrigholm, the cover was taken at the Pop-In club, while Wiremark say that it was taken at another club, Jazzen. Hirsch was hired by Parlophone to take a set of photos that could be used in promotional material, depicting Tages' members jamming or rehearsing. The photos were allegedly shot during drummer Lasse Svensson's first rehearsal with the band on 22 January 1967, but this has never been confirmed by Hirsch or the band. The cover was a departure from the group's three previous albums by being a straightforward picture of the band.

Studio was the first album by Tages to be released in a gatefold cover. (Note: Though sometimes cited as the first Swedish pop album released with a gatefold cover, Ola and the Janglers' album Pictures and Sounds featured a gatefold cover and was released four months before Studio.) The inlay of the gatefold depicts the band members during the recording process of the album. Their faces are superimposed over the words Studio. The typeface used for the album title, both on the front and back covers, was Futura Black, which was a reference and homage to the Who's album My Generation (1965). One of the photos in the inlay depicts Henriksson, included on request by Tages' band members. There is a picture of the fiddler Hubert Westerman as a homage to Dalarna. The liner notes were written by either guitarist Töpel or journalist Hans Sidén, both of whom had written liner notes for previous albums by the band. The title Studio was a suggestion by Blom who thought it was an internationally viable name. The name was chosen as a nod to Henriksson for his work in producing the album, and to the amount of effort and editing the recording sessions took.

== Release and commercial performance ==
Cashing in on "Treat Her Like a Lady" and the Christmas rush that was to come, Parlophone issued Studio on 4 December 1967 in a limited pressing of 5000 copies. (Note: Catalogue number PMCS 316. The Swedish and Danish releases share catalogue numbers.) Despite being marketed as Tages' international breakthrough, Studio was upon original release only issued in Sweden and Denmark. After having two singles, "I'm Going Out" and "Treat Her Like a Lady", chart in the Danish top ten, Parlophone believed that the band were big enough to warrant a release of their album in Denmark. There, it was issued in January 1968. The Danish and Swedish issues share the same cover, which was printed in Sweden, but feature different discs, pressed in their respective countries. Swedish-printed copies of the album were also distributed in Norway and Finland, where the band were relatively well known.

He [Göran Lagerberg] and the producer [Anders Henriksson] got very much involved. But we went too far away from what the sixteen and seventeen year old girls, who bought the records, liked.

— Tommy Blom (1988)

Studio did not sell as well as Parlophone and Tages wanted, and the latter were shocked when the album failed to become a big seller in Sweden. Unlike their two first albums, which sold well enough to become certified gold albums, Studio barely sold the 5000 initial copies that were printed. According to Wrigholm, the commercial failure was because Studio alienated Tages' teenage fans. At the same time, Tages were considered too much of a pop band for an older generation that might have enjoyed the album, but refrained from buying it.

In a last effort to promote Studio, Parlophone and Tages got SVT to finance the half-hour television special Dalamania, produced by Peter Goldmann and shot on location in Dalarna and at Radiohuset in Stockholm. The film features Tages lip syncing to songs from the album, including "Have You Seen Your Brother Lately", "Like a Woman" and "Seeing with Love". The name Dalamania was a nod to Dalarna and Beatlemania. Dalamania was aired on SVT's only national channel on 31 May 1968. Despite positive reviews of the show, it did not increase sales for Studio.

== Critical reception ==
=== Contemporary reviews ===
Upon original release, Studio received favourable reviews. Reviews appeared in both major publications and teen magazines, including Bildjournalen, where the in-house reviewer, Håkan Sandén, was an admirer of Tages. Sandén said he initially was disappointed by the album but nevertheless thought it was "phenomonal". He said that despite Tages' ability to "borrow" aspects from their favourite bands, Studio in no way plagiarizes them. He said he heard influences from the Beatles and that the inclusion of Swedish folk tones was great. He called the album "excellent throughout" and praised the album cover.

Studio was reviewed by a staff writer for Expressen, who said that Studio was less "odd and strange" than Contrast. The reviewer praised the songs on Studio, writing that several of them easily "get stuck in your head". The critic said that pretentiousness sometimes ruins the immersion, and criticized Tages for the inclusion of folk instruments, stating that "they were lost in the forest of gimmicks". The critic did praise some of the lyrics, believing that Tages "have found the importance of lyrics as well as music".Svenska Dagbladet gave the album a brief, positive review, stating that it is a well-produced and well-performed album by musicians who "very well know what they are doing". The critic called the gatefold cover unique.

The reviewer for Aftonbladet praised most of the material on Studio. Despite praising the production and recording, the critic was slightly disappointed in the string arrangement, comparing it unfavourably to a contemporary record by the Swedish Radio Symphony Orchestra. The critic described some of the lyrics as "stiff or awkward", particularly in "People Without Faces". Despite the criticism, the critic called the album "worthvile" and considered it one of the best Swedish album as of lately. In Göteborgs Handels- och Sjöfartstidning, Henning Svensson wrote that Studio is Tages' most personal album. Svensson said Tages "were trying to find new ways" with the album, something they succeeded with. He praised the inclusion of folk musicians which "makes the album unique, possibly the first of its kind" and applauded the general songwriting and production effort. In Hudiksvalls Tidning, the critic wrote that Studio showcases Tages' "ever growing musical ambitions" and complimented the songwriting.

=== Retrospective assessment ===
Professional ratings
Review scores
Source	Rating
AllMusic	3.5/5 stars
Mojo	4/5 stars
The Times	4/5 stars
Uncut	4/5 stars

Retrospectively, Studio has received acclaim by reviewers. In a review for AllMusic, music critic Richie Unterberger states that Studio sounds "pretty close to a mid-60's British group", which he attributes to Tages' ability and willingness to adapt to the current musical climate. While he says that Studio is "carefully arranged and produced", the songs found on the album "do not live up to their British influences". Therefore, Unterberger states that it is not surprising that Studio contains "florid-pop psychedelia" with "productional gimmicks", whimsical songwriting and "soul and orchestration in the arrangements". He says there are no bad tracks on the album which is composed "of approaches that were in fashion". He ends the review by praising Henriksson's work, stating that the album features "unique production tricks" which increase its appeal. Due to the variety of genres, Wrigholm says the album is not "plagiated from Beatles nor any other English bands", while stating that it is a product of its time.

Writing for Mojo magazine, Kieron Tyler describes Studio as a "groundbreaking riposte" to the Beatles' Sgt. Pepper's Lonely Hearts Club Band, stating that it is the best Swedish album of the 1960s. He says that Tages were "progressing forward" with the album and that it is "as striking" as Odessey and Oracle (1968) by the Zombies and "much more hard-hitting" than Butterfly (1967) by the Hollies. He positively reviews Tages' decision to use folk instruments rather than looking elsewhere for inspiration, stating that this was radical for its time. Tyler believes that the album was groundbreaking as it "fused traditional Swedish instruments" with "psych-pop", and ends the review by stating that it is as "important as any album by the Beatles". According to journalist Andres Lokko, the thing that distinguished Studio from contemporary albums, both Swedish and international, is "the confidence and usage in the Nordic folk music that characterizes so much of the content".

In 2010, a critic for The Times described Studio as "a record in a palpable thrall" compared to the "nascent psych-pop" from the United Kingdom. The critic singles out "Have You Seen Your Brother Lately" and "She's Having a Baby Now" for praise, considering them "punchier" equivalents to David Bowie's debut album from the same year. The critic calls Studio a "magnificent period piece". According to a staff review in 2017 for BrooklynVegan, the album could not have been more "aptly named". The critic states that the album "reveals itself" with repeated listens and is a "finely crafted piece of work" and a "treat", despite that Tages never made it big outside of Sweden. In 2010, Rock & Roll magazine critic Martin Theander compared Studio with work from the Beatles, stating that both took inspiration from the same sources which lead him to call Studio "a Swedish Sgt. Pepper". Despite this, Theander says that Studio has a place reserved right next to Odessey and Oracle rather than any Beatles album, while simultaneously believing Tages deserves the same cult status as the Zombies have. He says Studio should be listened to by "every pop musician" and considered their "holy heirloom".

In 1997, the Swedish Musicians' Union magazine Topp 40 placed Studio at position 36 on a list of the best Swedish albums of all time. The music magazine Sonic placed it as number 35 on its list of the 100 best original Swedish albums, where it was the only one by a Swedish pop band of the 1960s.

== Legacy ==
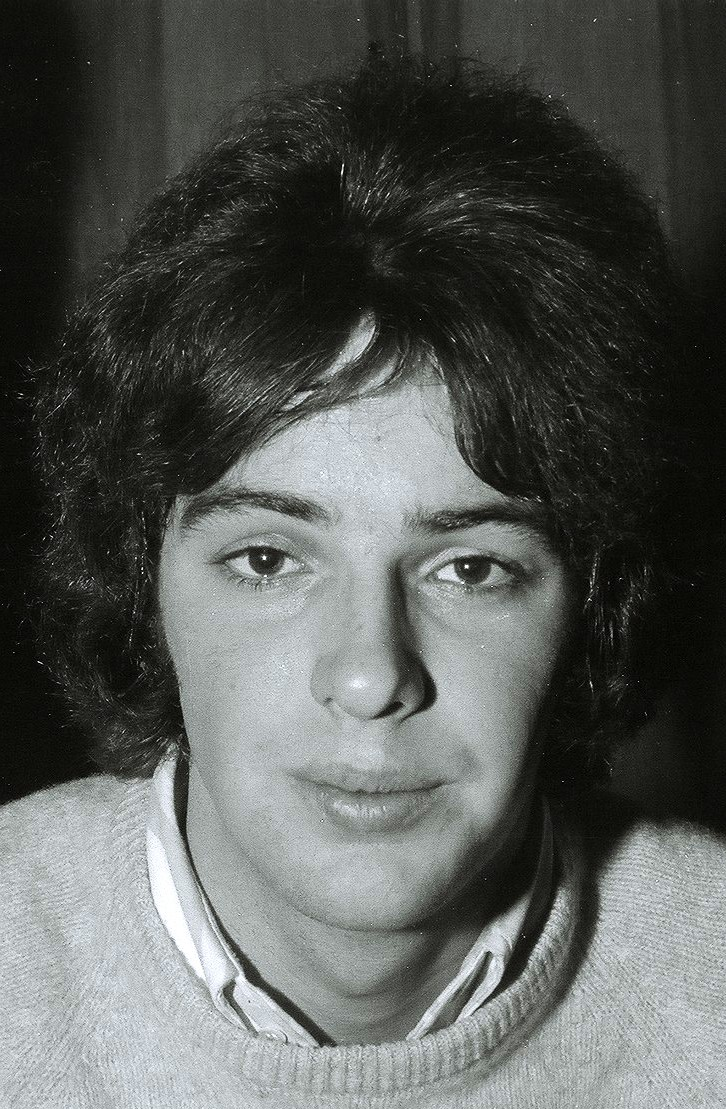
Studio was Tages' final album with lead singer Tommy Blom.

Studio was the first release in a row of singles and albums by Tages with disastrous commercial but superb critical reception. After "Treat Her Like a Lady", most singles by the band were ignored by the major newspapers; the following single, "There's a Blind Man Playin' Fiddle in the Street" (1968) was their final charting release, reaching number 10 on Tio i Topp for a week in February 1968. Wrigholm says these failures were for the same reason Studio failed to sell: they were artistical highpoints which did not appeal to record buyers.

Lead vocalist Blom became disillusioned with Tages as he was largely considered a secondary member by 1968, overshadowed by Lagerberg who by this point was the band's artistical driving force. Blom criticized Parlophone for their failure to promote Studio and the band's failure to crack the English music market. This culminated with him leaving the band in the summer of 1968 to focus on a solo career, leaving the rest of the band as a quartet. In retrospect, Blom argued that Tages should have recorded Studio a year later, when Sweden's Ministry of Culture began to support the recording of pop albums financially. After Blom's departure, Tages would do one final attempt at international success, after they recorded the similarly folk-inspired album The Lilac Years in London in 1969; for this release the band was renamed to Blond which made Studio the last album recorded under Tages' name.

After the release, Studio fell into obscurity as the musical directions in Sweden changed into heavier rock and the political movement progg. In the 1980s, the album was spreading through word of mouth and became a cult album among fans of 1960s pop music in Sweden. With the renewed attention, it began to receive widespread acclaim and was seen as a major influence on folk-rock fusion. For their usage of Swedish folk musicians, Tages were seen as pioneers by many critics. American indie pop band the Lemon Twigs cited Tages' recording experimentation on Studio as a primary influence for their 2024 album A Dream Is All We Know.

Studio was not re-issued in full until 1994, when it was released on the CD Fantasy Island, a part of the 3-CD box-set This One's for You!, which collected all of Tages' recorded output. The first dedicated re-release of the album came in 1998 when it was re-mastered and issued on CD through EMI Records. This edition features bonus tracks, all of which were the A- and B-sides of Tages' 1968 singles. The same bonus tracks are present on the album's first international release in 2010 on RPM Records, at the initiative of Tyler. In 2015, Studio received its first vinyl re-issue for Record Store Day, released under the Parlophone brand as an exact replica of the 1967 LP. In 2017, Bear Family Records issued the album on vinyl, featuring a different layout compared to the original release.

== Track listing ==
Writing credits adapted from original 1967 release. Track lengths and vocals according the liner notes of the 1998 re-issue of Studio.

Side one
No.	Title	Writer(s)	Lead vocals	Length
1.	"Have You Seen Your Brother Lately"	Anders Henriksson; Göran Lagerberg	Lagerberg	2:10
2.	"It's My Life"	Henriksson; Lagerberg	Lagerberg	2:36
3.	"Like a Woman"	Henriksson; Lagerberg; Danne Larsson	Lagerberg	2:21
4.	"People Without Faces"	Tommy Blom	Blom	1:56
5.	"I Left My Shoes at Home"	Blom; Larsson	Blom	1:38
6.	"She Is a Man"	Henriksson; Bengt Palmers	Blom; Henriksson	2:34
Total length:				13:15

Side two
No.	Title	Writer(s)	Lead vocals	Length
7.	"Seeing with Love"	Blom; Lagerberg; Larsson; Lasse Svensson; Anders Töpel	Lagerberg	3:32
8.	"Created by You"	Claes Dieden	Blom	2:41
9.	"What's the Time"	Blom; Larsson	Lagerberg	2:10
10.	"It's in a Dream"	Henriksson; Lagerberg	Lagerberg	2:42
11.	"She's Having a Baby Now"	Blom; Lagerberg; Larsson; Svensson; Töpel	Blom; Lagerberg	2:04
12.	"The Old Man Wafwer"	Blom; Henriksson; Lagerberg	instrumental	4:13
Total length:				17:22

1998 and 2010 CD re-issue bonus tracks
No.	Title	Writer(s)	Lead vocals	Length
13.	"There's a Blind Man Playin' Fiddle in the Street" (Single A-side, 1968)	Lagerberg	Lagerberg	1:57
14.	"Fantasy Island" (Single A-side, 1968)	Henriksson; Lagerberg; Larsson	Blom; Lagerberg	2:28
15.	"To Be Free" (B-side of "Fantasy Island", 1968)	Lagerberg; Björn Töpel	Blom	2:59
16.	"I Read You Like an Open Book" (Single A-side, 1968)	Henriksson; Lagerberg; Adrian Moar	Lagerberg	2:40
17.	"Halcyon Days" (B-side of "I Read You Like an Open Book", 1968)	Andy Bown; Peter Frampton	Blom; Lagerberg	2:16
Total length:				12:20

== Personnel ==
Personnel according to the liner notes of the 1998 re-issue of Studio.

Tages

- Tommy Blom – lead vocals (4–6, 8, 11), rhythm guitar, percussion
- Göran Lagerberg – lead vocals (1–3, 7, 9–11), harmony and backing vocals (2–3, 5, 7), bass guitar
- Danne Larsson – rhythm guitar, piano (5), harmony and backing vocals (3, 5, 7–8, 11)
- Anders Töpel – lead guitar, harmony and backing vocals (11)
- Lasse Svensson – drums, percussion

Production

- Anders Henriksson – producer, technician, lead vocals (6), harmony and backing vocals (2–3, 5, 7–8, 11), piano (6, 8–11),
  organ (1–3, 9–10), celesta (4, 8), accordion (2, 12)
- Ron Richards – co-producer (3, 10)

Technicians

- Björn Almstedt (1–2, 4–9, 11–12)
- Ken Scott (3, 10)
- Jeff Jarrat (3, 10)

Other musicians

- Swedish Radio Symphony Orchestra – classical string instruments (4–5, 12)
- Lasse Samuelson's Orchestra – brass instruments (5, 7, 9, 12)
- Skansen's Spelmanslag – violins, fiddles (1)
- Pål Olle – violin, fiddle (1, 7)
- Pekkos Gustaf – violin, fiddle (1, 7)
- Janne Kling – cornett (1, 7), crumhorn (7), spilåpipa (7), flute (8–9, 12)

== Notes and references ==
Notes
