= Tages (EP) =

EP by Tages
- Released: 4 June 1965
- Recorded: 4–6 May 1965
- Studio: EMI, Stockholm, Sweden
- Genre: Beat; rock
- Length: 10:17
- Label: Platina
- Producer: Rune Wallebom

Tages chronology
Tages (1965)	Tages (album) (1965)

Singles from Tages
- 1. "Don't Turn Your Back" / "Hound Dog" Released: 14 May 1965

Tages (commonly referred to as Don't Turn Your Back) is the first seven-inch extended play by Swedish rock group Tages, a release which features four songs, two of which showcase the early songwriting talent of the band. It was initially released on 4 June 1965 in 1000 copies on Platina Records.

== Background and release ==
During the spring of 1965, Tages had become one of the biggest groups in Sweden, having released two singles that both reached the top-five on Kvällstoppen and Tio i Topp. However, the group had received criticism for these releases; the first of which "Sleep Little Girl", was negatively received while the other one "I Should Be Glad" was considered too lightweight. Additionally, the group's label Platina Records did not have a designated studio, instead, these singles had been recorded at a youth center and at Metronome Studios respectively. These facilities were not equipped with the necessary equipment for proper recording, which, combined with the fact that the group never used a producer who they liked resulted in an inferior sound than they were looking for.

This changed around April 1965 however. Platina signed a contract with EMI Records which lent them their studio on Sandhamnsgatan in Gärdet, Stockholm. This led to Tages booking studio time during their first tour in Stockholm in early May 1965. They had been working on several compositions, while also starting experimenting with other instruments. Rhythm guitarist Danne Larsson had been learning the piano and as a result, he was played the organ on a few of the EP's tracks. The group entered the studio on 4 May to record "Forget Him", while the following session held during the night between 5–6 May produced such songs as "Don't Turn Your Back", "Donna" and "Hound Dog". Two of these tracks, "Forget Him" and "Don't Turn Your Back" were original compositions, while the other two were covers.

The first songs released from these sessions came in the form of a single, where the songs "Don't Turn Your Back" and "Hound Dog" were used as an A- and B-side respectively. This, their third single, was released around a week after recording on 14 May, reaching number two on both Kvällstoppen and Tio i Topp. The popularity of the group was now a sealed fact and the group had begun to process requests for summer performances, becoming the most requested band during that summer. To capitalize this success and to tease the public on about what was going to happen during the summer, Platina Records decided to release the EP on 4 June 1965. It proved to be the final release by the band produced by Rune Wallebom; they met Anders Henriksson during their summer tour, upon which he would produce the rest of their material. The EP features lead vocals from four members of the group.

== Track listing ==
Side one
No.	Title	Writer(s)	Lead vocals	Length
1.	"Don't Turn Your Back"	Anders Töpel; Göran Lagerberg	Anders Töpel; Göran Lagerberg	2:08
2.	"Forget Him"	Tommy Blom	Tommy Blom	2:59
Total length:				5:07

Side two
No.	Title	Writer(s)	Lead vocals	Length
1.	"Donna"	Ritchie Valens	Töpel	3:23
2.	"Hound Dog"	Jerry Leiber; Mike Stoller	Lagerberg	1:47
Total length:				5:10

== Personnel ==
Tages

- Tommy Blom – lead and backing vocals, tambourine, harmonica
- Göran Lagerberg – lead and backing vocals, bass guitar
- Danne Larsson – lead and backing vocals, rhythm guitar, organ
- Anders Töpel – lead and backing vocals, lead guitar
- Freddie Skantze – drums

== Sources ==
- Brandels, Göran; Wrigholm, Lennart (2012). Boken om Tages: från Avenyn till Abbey Road. Premium Publishing. ISBN 978-91-89136-88-5.
- Wrigholm, Lennart (1991). "Tages: Makalös grej i Götet..." Now & Then.
