= Dagny =

Dagny may refer to:

- Dagny (name), a female first name
- Dagny (film), a 1977 Norwegian-Polish film
- Dagny, Seine-et-Marne, a commune in France
- Dagny-Lambercy, a commune in Aisne, France
- SS Dagny, a ship name
- "Dagny" (song), a 1958 Owe Thörnqvist song
- Dagny (magazine), a Swedish women's magazine
- Dagny (singer) (born 1990), Norwegian pop singer
