= Contrast (Tages album) =

Studio album by Tages
- Released: 28 April 1967
- Recorded: January–March 1967
- Studio: Europafilm, Stockholm
- Genre: Baroque pop; freakbeat; pop rock; psychedelic pop; soul-pop
- Length: 24:12
- Label: Parlophone
- Producer: Anders Henriksson

Tages chronology
Extra Extra (1966)	Contrast (1967)	Studio (1967)

Singles from Contrast
- 1. "Every Raindrop Means a Lot" Released: 15 February 1967; 2. "I'm Going Out" Released: 14 April 1967

Contrast is the fourth studio album by the Swedish pop band Tages, released on 28 April 1967 through Parlophone Records. Contrast was preceded by a tumultuous period in Tages' career, in which drummer Tommy Tausis left the band for the Spotnicks only days before recording commenced. The album is the first to feature Tausis' replacement Lasse Svensson, who would stay with the group until 1969. It was also Tages' first album to be released through Parlophone, following three albums by independent record label Platina. Parlophone guaranteed Tages free studio time, resulting in the sessions for Contrast.

Musically, Contrast features the soul-pop style present on their third album Extra Extra, but also expands on Tages and producer Anders Henriksson's willingness to experiment with psychedelic music, resulting in a variety of studio effects applied onto the tracks, including backmasking and reverberation. Contrast was recorded during the first three months of 1967 at Europafilm Studio, and featured an album cover illustrated by Håkan Gustaf Carlström. The singles "Every Raindrop Means a Lot" and "I'm Going Out" preceded the album release. Contrast received critical acclaim by fans and critics alike upon release.

== Background ==
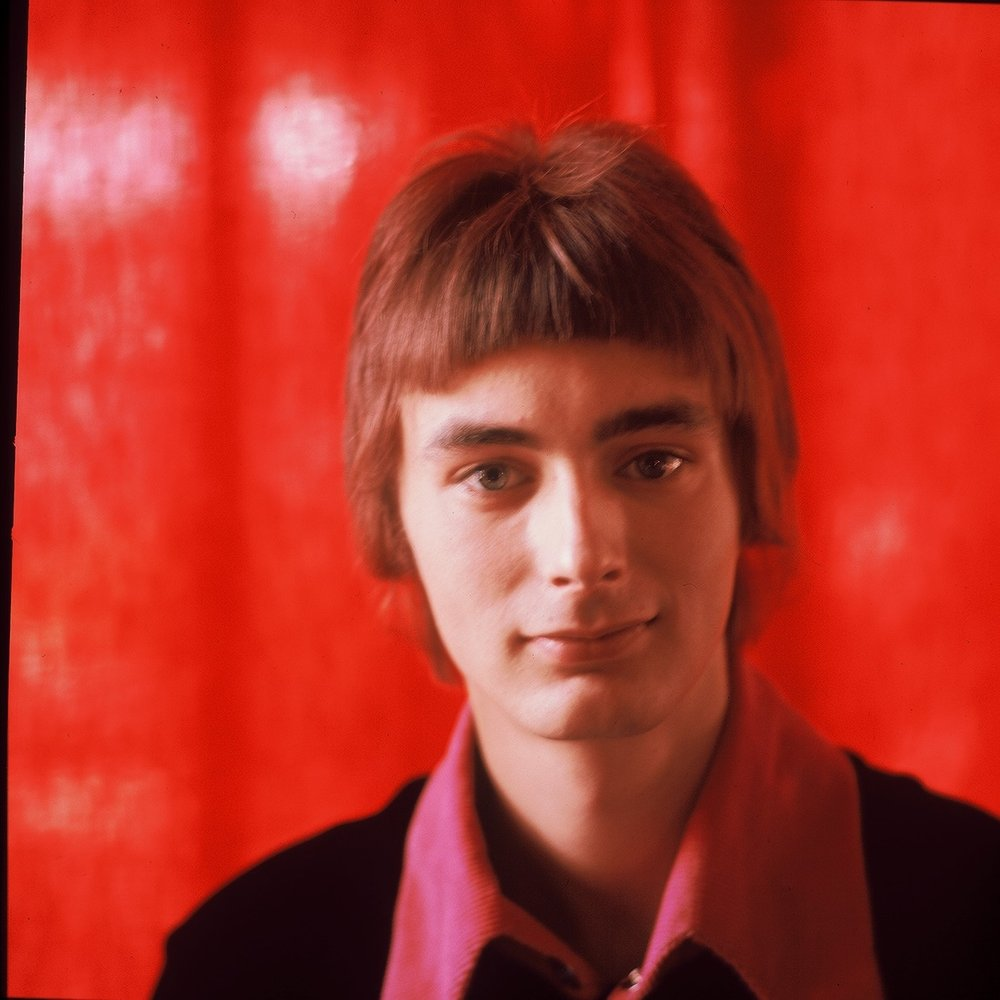
Drummer Tommy Tausis left Tages only days before the recording of Contrast began.

On 28 November 1966, Tages released their third studio album Extra Extra through Platina Records; two days later, their single "Miss Mac Baren" was also released. The single became a hit, reaching number 4 on Tio i Topp and reaching number 1 on Kvällstoppen in January 1967. Both releases received critical acclaim, with critics deeming Extra Extra to be Tages' best album thus far; according to Tages' biographer Lennart Wrigholm, Extra Extra represented the group's "top of the form" as a pop band. The album mixed influences, ranging from soul-pop to psychedelia; their producer Anders Henriksson had assisted them in the studio and incorporated various unorthodox techniques, such as backmasking and reverberation. Despite these promising conditions, the album wasn't a strong seller compared to their debut Tages (1965) and Tages 2 (1966), both of which had sold gold.

January 1967 came to be a tumultuous period for Tages, who began suffering from line-up instabilities. On 13 January, Tages drummer Tommy Tausis received a phone call from the Spotnicks who were in the middle of a tour of Mexico and inquired if Tasusis was willing to replace drummer Jimmie Nicol, who left the Spotnicks. Despite being handed these news on such notice, Tausis accepted and flew to join with the rest of the Spotnicks in Mexico without informing Tages; allegedly, they first knew of Tausis' departure during a vacation to the Canary Islands, where their manager Rolf Hedin sent them a telegram stating that Tages' "should look for a drummer who is good looking and talented". Drummer Lasse Svensson (brother of Lill-Babs) of the Stockholm band Hi-Balls received the phone call, upon which he hastily travelled to Gothenburg to meet up with Tages.

Another incident which occurred during roughly the same time was that Tages' record contract with Platina lapsed on New Year's Eve 1966, upon which the band opted out from extending it further. Platina, an independent record label, had a tight economic budget which meant that they couldn't provide nor present the group with a gold record for the sales of Tages 2. Additionally, the band had seen clashes with label owner Evert Jakobsson over royalties. Instead, Tages were offered a recording contract by EMI Records, who guaranteed Tages' unlimited studio time, which wasn't financially viable under Platina. Tages opted to sign with the label since their releases would be distributed by EMI sublabel Parlophone, effectively making them label-mates with the Beatles.

== Recording and composition ==
Recording of Contrast was sporadic, with the first track being worked upon being the single "Every Raindrop Means a Lot", which was recorded on 15 January 1967. Tages and Anders Henriksson worked in the Europafilm located in Mariehäll, Stockholm throughout the first few months of 1967. Europafilm had been their preferred studio since the 1965 single "The One for You". Henriksson was behind a large portion of Tages' commercial output since the summer of 1965, and on Contrast he further expanded on the studio techniques found on Extra Extra, mostly revolving sound effects, though also applying reverb on several tracks. Guitarist Anders Töpel and vocalist Tommy Blom managed to imitate a thunderstorm by using a piece of sheet metal in the studio's backroom; this sound effect was liked enough by the band to be applied on multiple tracks. For the sessions, Henriksson had gotten ahold of a signal generator that was used in the recording of the Beach Boys 1966 single "Good Vibrations". Due to the fact that EMI had guaranteed Tages' unlimited time in the studio, their work became more "relaxed" as no pressure was put upon them. Tages biographer Kjell Wiremark attributes their changed sound to recently joined drummer Lasse Svensson.

Henkan [Anders Henriksson] found the songs and suggested them to us. We went up a division when we began recording material such as "I'm Going Out" and "House of Soul Hill."

— Danne Larsson (2012)

Musically, Contrast is "a mixed bag in genres", containing both elements of the soul-pop present on Extra Extra, but expanding it with contemporary psychedelic rock which Tages' would master on their fifth album Studio (1967). Side one opens with "I'm Going Out", a cover of the Lesley Gore song from the year prior. It was introduced to Tages by Henriksson, who found it as an acetate disc in EMI's Swedish office. "Sister's Got a Boyfriend" which follows, is a soul song sung by bassist Göran Lagerberg and featuring brass by Lars Samuelson's Orchestra. Allegedly, Henriksson forced Lagerberg to eat crayons before "walking him out of the studio to yell his voice coarse". The third track, "Hear My Lamentation", was written by Henriksson and Lagerberg and is "sparsely arranged" and revolves around an organ. "Fuzzy Patterns" was written by Tommy Blom, and is a psychedelic track "typical of the time". It opens with a recording of actress Grynet Molvig laughing and also features an spoken instrumental break. "One Day", composed by Lagerberg and rhythm guitarist Danne Larsson is "another conventional psychedelic song" broken by an "unconventional accordion solo" performed by Henriksson. Side one's closer, "You're Too Incomprehensible" written by Henriksson and troubadour Thorstein Bergman, was considered "one of the first psychedelic Swedish works" by Wiremark. It is one of the more advanced productions on the album, and features backmasked drums and bicycle bells playing in the background.

Side two opens with "Every Raindrop Means a Lot", a group composition. It features rain sound effects during the instrumental breaks connecting the chorus and verses, along with what biographers Brandels and Wrigholm call "nonsensical psychedelic lyrics". "Wanting", which follows, was written by American folk musician Pete Antell and initially released by him that same year. Sparsely arranged and largely driven by Larsson's rhythm guitar, it was introduced to the band through Henriksson, who in addition plays glockenspiel on the song. "Prisoner 763" was written by Blom and Larsson, and lyrically tells the tale of man sentenced to death. It revolves around reverberated harpsichord patterns played by Henriksson, and is interchangeably sung by Blom and Lagerberg. The album's tenth track "Why Do You Hide It?" is a baroque pop song largely performed by a string quartet, with Tages only performing during a brief bridge sung by Lagerberg. It features what Wiremark calls the "weirdest lyrics in Tages' career", where Lagerberg sings about how a woman "is the prettiest child a woman has given birth to". "House Of Soul Hill" is an upbeat soul-pop song that is "characterized by" the brass arrangement Lars Samuelson's Orchestra plays on it, along with a guitar solo by Töpel. Contrast's closing track, "Short Song (Steps)", is also the shortest, featuring Blom alone on guitar, with sound effects of him walking "in and out of the studio", which was inspired by the Zombies album track "The Way I Feel Inside" (1965).

== Release and reception ==
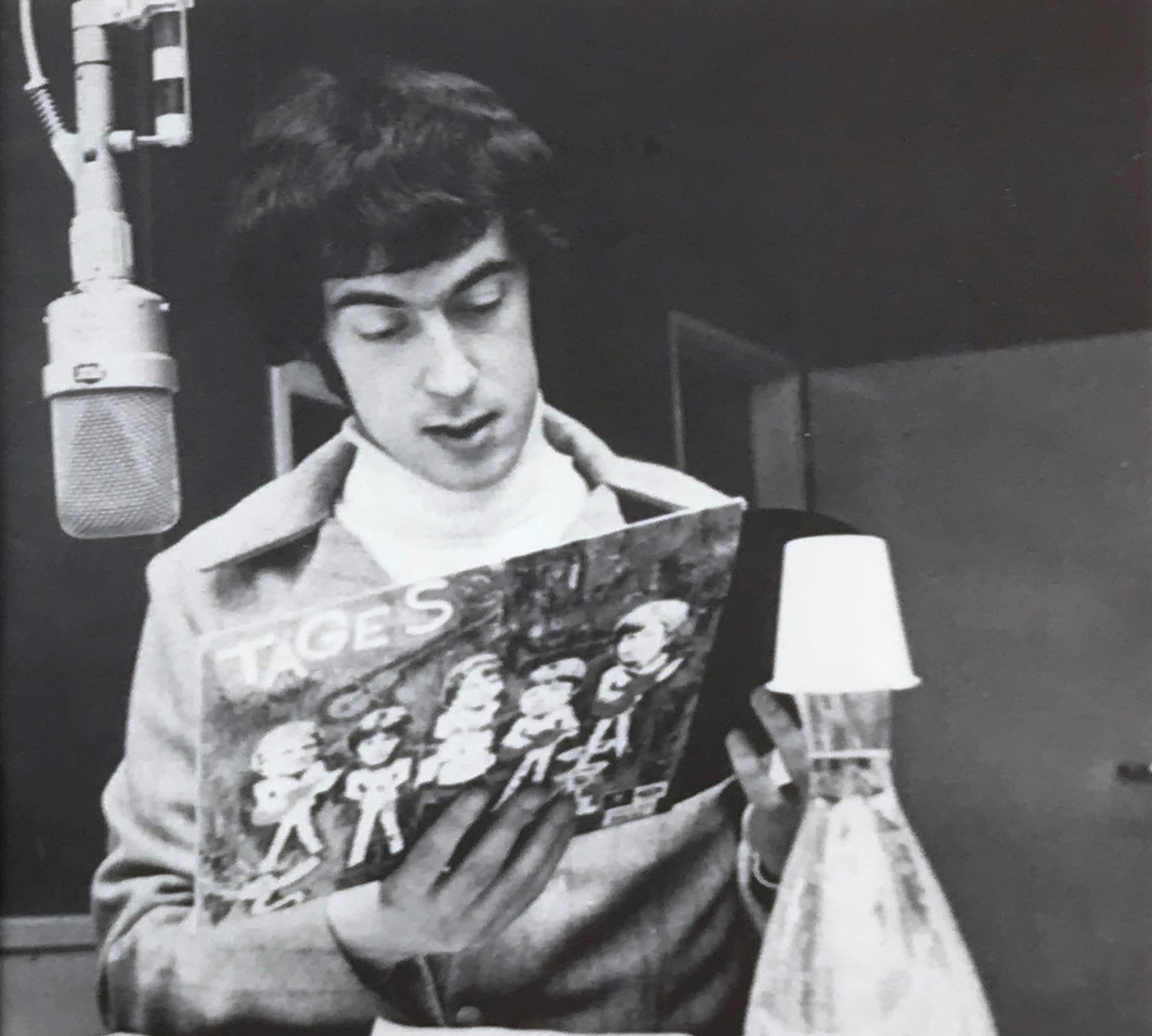
Roger Wallis reviewing Contrast for Sveriges Radio. The album was critically acclaimed.

The album cover of Contrast was a painting illustrated by Håkan Gustaf Carlström, and features photos of Tages taken by Hans Sidén superimposed on top. Wiremark considers the artwork as much of "an artistic statement as the music inside". Two singles preceded the album's release; the first was "Every Raindrop Means a Lot", backed by the non-album track "Look What You Get", released on 15 February 1967. This release became a considerable success, reaching number 2 on Tio i Topp and number 4 on Kvällstoppen. The second single, "I'm Going Out", was issued two weeks before the album, and was backed by "Fuzzy Patterns". It also reached number 2 on Tio i Topp, and reached number 3 on Kvällstoppen. Contrast was released as Tages' first album through Parlophone Records and fourth overall release on 28 April 1967, initially in 5000 copies. A release party was held on the same day the album was issued and it quickly began circulating on Sveriges Radio P3, due to disc jockeys being fans of Tages.

The album received critical acclaim upon release in 1967, with many fans and reviewers considering it to be Tages' best album. In a review for Show Business shortly after release, Håkan Sandén was brief, stating that "no prior presentation was needed" and claimed that the album was "well-produced pop that would sell itself". Reviewing for Arbetet, a critic considers Contrast to be Tages' "most ambitious release", praising Anders Henriksson's production and the quality of the material found on the album, stating that "Tages' has a tendency to only improve with every release". In his review of the album for Expressen, Peter Himmelstrand considers Contrast to be a "large step for Swedish pop", writing that the album is "great pop music which is good" yet never "takes itself too seriously", with some "whimsical undertones to it". Himmelstrand also praises the album cover, considering it "an artistic masterpiece" that was "almost as great as the music".

A staff writer for Aftonbladet calls Contrast "first-rate", both musically and production-wise, noting that "Henriksson has never been better". They write that the album is filled with "gimmickal ideas" that never "become cheesy nor dated" and positively notes the album cover, considering it one of the best to originate from Sweden. In Göteborgs-Posten, the staff reviewer notes that a "row of new ideas" are tested on Contrast, something which they claim Tages succeed in. They single out "House Of Soul Hill", "Hear My Lamentation" and "Every Raindrop Means a Lot" as their favourite picks, noting that "they all sound different musically". They praise Carlström for the drawing, calling it "wonderfully beautiful" and considers it a milestone in the development of Swedish pop. The reviewer for Svenska Dagbladet states that Contrast was rightfully promoted by Parlophone, writing that it was one of the better albums to get issued in Sweden, praising Henriksson's production and singles out "Why Do You Hide It?" for the arrangement.

== Track listing ==
Writing credits, track length and vocals adapted from the 1994 box set This One's for You!.

Side one
No.	Title	Writer(s)	Lead vocals	Length
1.	"I'm Going Out"	Bob Crewe; Gary Knight	Göran Lagerberg; Danne Larsson	2:15
2.	"Sister's Got a Boyfriend"	Isaac Hayes; Allen Jones; David Porter	Lagerberg	2:40
3.	"Hear My Lamentation"	Anders Henriksson; Göran Lagerberg	Lagerberg	1:35
4.	"Fuzzy Patterns"	Tommy Blom	Tommy Blom	2:03
5.	"One Day"	Lagerberg; Danne Larsson	Lagerberg	1:45
6.	"You're Too Incomprehensible"	Thorstein Bergman; Henriksson (Note: On original release, Henriksson and Bergman are credited under the pseudonyms F. Akon and F. Thokon, respectively.)	Larsson; Anders Henriksson	2:34
Total length:				12:52

Side two
No.	Title	Writer(s)	Lead vocals	Length
7.	"Every Raindrop Means a Lot"	Blom; Lagerberg; Larsson; Lasse Svensson; Anders Töpel	Blom; Lagerberg	2:14
8.	"Wanting"	Pete Antell	Lagerberg	2:00
9.	"Prisoner 763"	Blom; Larsson	Blom; Larsson	1:48
10.	"Why Do You Hide It?"	Blom; Larsson	Blom; Lagerberg	2:10
11.	"House Of Soul Hill"	Ray Eddlemon; Scott Turner	Lagerberg	1:58
12.	"Short Song (Steps)"	Blom	Blom	1:10
Total length:				11:20

== Notes and references ==
Notes

=== Sources ===
- Brandels, Göran; Wrigholm, Lennart (2012). Boken om Tages: från Avenyn till Abbey Road (in Swedish). Premium Publishing. ISBN 978-91-89136-88-5.
- Englund, Magnus (Summer 1988). "An interview with Tommy Blom". Ugly Things (7). Archived from the original on 5 June 2020.
- Hallberg, Eric; Henningsson, Ulf (2012). Tio i Topp – med de utslagna "på försök" 1961–74 (in Swedish). Premium Publishing. ISBN 978-91-89136-89-2.
- Hallberg, Eric (1993). Eric Hallberg presenterar Kvällstoppen i P3 (in Swedish). Drift. ISBN 9-789-16-302-14-04.
- Olofsson, Hans (1995). Stora Popboken – Svensk Rock & Pop 1954–1969 (in Swedish). Premium Publishing. ISBN 9-197-1894-48. Archived from the original on 21 October 2020.
- Wiremark, Kjell (1994). Tages – This One's For You! (CD) (in Swedish). EMI. 4751382.
- Wrigholm, Lennart (1991). "Tages: Makalös grej i Götet…". Now & then (in Swedish).
