= Plommons =

Band from Sweden

- Origin: Sundbyberg, Sweden
- Genres: Pop rock; rock
- Years active: 1964–1967; 1985–
- Past members: Maud "Maddan" Lindqvist; Eva "Plommon" Soelberg; Eva Kroon-Bisenius; Ninni Granelli

Plommons were a Swedish, all-female pop rock band formed in 1964. They are considered the first female rock group from Sweden. During their recording career, the band released three singles, and covered several popular songs from the United States before breaking up in 1967. The band sporadically reform, the first reunion being in 1985.

== History ==
In 1964, the band was formed by coincidence when Maud "Måddan" Lindqvist (born 1946) met with Eva "Plommon" Håkansson (later Soelberg, born 1947) to give guitar lessons in Sundbyberg. Lindqvist knew only three chords at the time and Soelberg was just starting to play. The two met a local news reporter who was looking for a musical group to write an article on. When asked if the two were involved in a band, Lindqvist replied "Yes sir, you have the honor to meet Sweden's first female pop band". Lindqvist and Håkansson quickly needed to form a band so they contacted Eva Kroon (later Kroon-Bisenius, born 1947) to play the piano. The article was published and the group decided they needed to take advantage of the exposure. Lindqvist became lead guitarist and lead singer, Håkansson played bass guitar, Kroon switched to drums, and they choose to be known as Plommons. Before their first gig, they added the last piece of the lineup, Ingrid "Ninni" Granelli (born 1946), to play keyboards.

The group learned three songs for their first gig, a battle of the bands contest in Nalen. When the band won the contest, they developed a larger repertoire and played in more concerts. They played at prominent Swedish venues like the Solliden stage at Skansen, and their big breakthrough at the Gröna Lund Hip Pop Show. The pop show resulted in signing a manager, who also managed the Tages and initiated a national tour in the summer of 1965. They were the opening for prominent Swedish acts, even for the British rock band, The Who at Hovet. In November of the same year, they made an appearance on the television program, Drop-in, which was followed by studio recording. The band recorded three singles, the first being "Last Train to Liverpool" backed with "Hungry for Love". Linqvist composed "Last Train to Liverpool" and the rest of the band's original material. Despite the lack of commercial success, the band expanded their touring schedule to other countries including Finland, Denmark, and Germany. For two years, the band conducted successful tours, but in the Summer of 1967 the band disbanded as Håkansson and Kroon left for college.

Lindqvist formed a new band called the Sunny Girls who she toured with in the United States. They had long-lasting popularity in Las Vegas, and are the only Swedish pop band to perform in Las Vegas. The Plommons reformed for the first time in 1985 to play on the show, King Creole. The band continues to have reunion tours with the original lineup on several other instances.
