= Idolerna =

Swedish pop music group

- Genres: pop, rock, schlager
- Members: Lalla Hansson, Svenne Hedlund, Tommy Blom, Lennart Grahn

Idolerna ("The Idols") is a Swedish pop music group which includes the 1960s pop idols Lalla Hansson, Svenne Hedlund, Tommy Blom and Lennart Grahn. In 2000 their song "Här kommer kärleken" was nominated as "Årets låt på Svensktoppen" ("The Svensktoppen Song of this Year") and in 2001 they were nominated as "Årets svensktoppsartister" ("The Svensktoppen Singers of the Year"). In 2000–01 they went for 3 concert tours in Sweden with total 60 performances together with "Idolorkestern" ("The Idol Orchestra") which included Håkan Almqvist (bass), Micke Littwold (guitar/keyboard), Hasse Olsson (hammond organ), Pelle Alsing (drums) and Billy Bremner (lead guitar).

== Discography ==
=== Albums ===
- 2000: Idolerna
- 2001: Greatest Hits, Live & More

=== Singles ===
- 2001: "Här kommer kärleken"
- 2001: "Nu leker livet"
- 2001: "Sommar"
