= Don't Turn Your Back =

Single by Tages

from the EP Tages
- B-side: "Hound Dog"
- Released: 14 May 1965
- Recorded: 4–6 May 1965
- Studio: EMI, Stockholm
- Genre: Beat; soft rock
- Length: 2:17
- Label: Platina
- Songwriters: Göran Lagerberg; Anders Töpel
- Producer: Rune Wallebom

Tages singles chronology
"I Should Be Glad" (1965)	"Don't Turn Your Back" (1965)	"The One For You" (1965)

"Don't Turn Your Back" is a song by the Swedish rock band Tages. It was written by bass guitarist Göran Lagerberg and guitarist Anders Töpel, and first recorded by in 1965. Produced by the Violents guitarist Rune Wallebom, the song would be featured as the lead track from the band's debut EP Tages, which was released three weeks later.

The song was the third and final single by the group to employ a similar sound; heavily involving acoustic guitars combined with positive lyrics. Released as a single on 14 May, it was a commercial success, reaching number two on both Kvällstoppen and Tio i Topp during the summer of 1965.

== Background and recording ==
Throughout early 1965, Tages established themselves as successful recording artists; they had recorded two singles, "Sleep Little Girl" (1964) and "I Should Be Glad" (1965). Both of these singles were commercially successful, reaching the top three on both Kvällstoppen and Tio i Topp. The former became the group's best selling single while the latter was well received in the Swedish press, unlike "Sleep Little Girl" which was panned. However, "I Should Be Glad" was also criticized for being "too poppy". Similarly, the group now had to face the challenges of being national stars, being chased around by girls around Gothenburg, which took its toll on the band members, who still had to keep up with school while recording.

A similar issue also faced their record label, Platina Records. Platina was, at the time, an entirely independent record label, whose success was dependent on Tages. Therefore, they had no distribution deal nor a recording studio, which resulted in "Sleep Little Girl" and "I Should Be Glad" being recorded in a youth centre and at the rival Metronome studio respectively. In April 1965 however, Platina signed a contract with EMI Records which lent them their studio on Sandhamnsgatan in Gärdet, Stockholm. Platina promptly booked studio time for the band in May during one of their tours. On 4 May 1965, they entered the studio with former the Violents guitarist Rune Wallebom as the producer, as he had produced "I Should Be Glad" as well. Upon finalizing their recordings on 6 May, the session resulted in four songs, "Don't Turn Your Back", "Forget Him", as well as covers of "Donna" and "Hound Dog".

== Release ==
Platina Records did not keep "Don't Turn Your Back" unreleased for long, as "I Should Be Glad" had begun to drop out of the charts and required a follow-up. On 14 May 1965, Platina released "Don't Turn Your Back" as a single, backed by "Hound Dog", which was a Leiber–Stoller composition. This was the first time a cover song by the group was released, as both the A-side and B-sides of their two previous singles were original compositions. It was initially released in sleeves with both pink and orange text. Due to the success the single would get, it was eventually re-pressed in November 1965, and featured an alternate picture sleeve that featured a different photo of the band altogether.

Released in time for their summer tour, it became a commercial success on both Sweden's record charts Kvällstoppen and Tio i Topp. It entered Kvällstoppen on 6 June at a position of 14, before reaching number two on 20 July, a position it held for one week. It was last seen on the chart on 14 September at a position of 16. It spent 16 weeks on the chart, seven of which were in the top-ten and three in the top-five. On Tio i Topp it was also successful, being voted in at number 11 on 29 May. It also peaked at number two on 12 June, a position it also would hold for a week. It was kept from the number one spot by "Here Comes the Night" by Them. It was last seen on 24 July of that year at a position of 12. In total, "Don't Turn Your Back" spent nine weeks on the chart.

Neither "Don't Turn Your Back" nor its B-side were included on any studio albums the group released during the 1960s. However, it was featured as the lead track from their eponymous debut EP, released three weeks after the single on 4 June 1965, and following the group's contract with Platina Records expiring in 1967, also included on Hits Volym 1 in August 1967. That same month, a compilation album named The Best Of Tages was released, which included "Don't Turn Your Back" as the third track. The track's first release on compact disc was on a CD-reissue of a compilation album named Tages, 1964–1968!, released on 18 November 1992, where the song was the third track. Both sides of the single would be released on the This One's For You Box Set, released on 28 November 1964 together with all the group's other recordings.

== Charts ==
Chart (1965)	Peak position
Sweden (Kvällstoppen)	2
Sweden (Tio i Topp)	2

== Sources ==
- Brandels, Göran; Wrigholm, Lennart (2012). Boken om Tages: från Avenyn till Abbey Road. Premium Publishing. ISBN 978-91-89136-88-5.
- Wrigholm, Lennart (1991). "Tages: Makalös grej i Götet…". Now & then.
