= SS Dagny =

SS Dagny may refer to:

- SS Dagny (1882), a Danish ship lost in 1920.
- SS Dagny (1927), a Finnish cargo ship in service 1951–67.
