= Dagny (song) =

Song by Owe Thörnqvist
- Language: Swedish
- Released: 1958
- Genre: schlager
- Label: Metronome
- Songwriter: Owe Thörnqvist

"Dagny" is a song written by Owe Thörnqvist and recorded by him on a 1958 EP. The song lyrics tell the story of "Dagny", a waitress girl at "Café 7:an".

A Lalla Hansson recording charted for 11 weeks between 1 July and 9 September 1973, peaking at second position. The song is also common at sing-along events in Sweden.

At Dansbandskampen 2009, the song was recorded by The Playtones and appeared on their 2010 album Rock'n'Roll Dance Party.

A heavy metal version was recorded by Flintstens med Stanley.

The song is one of the titles in the book Tusen svenska klassiker (2009).
