= Danne Larsson =

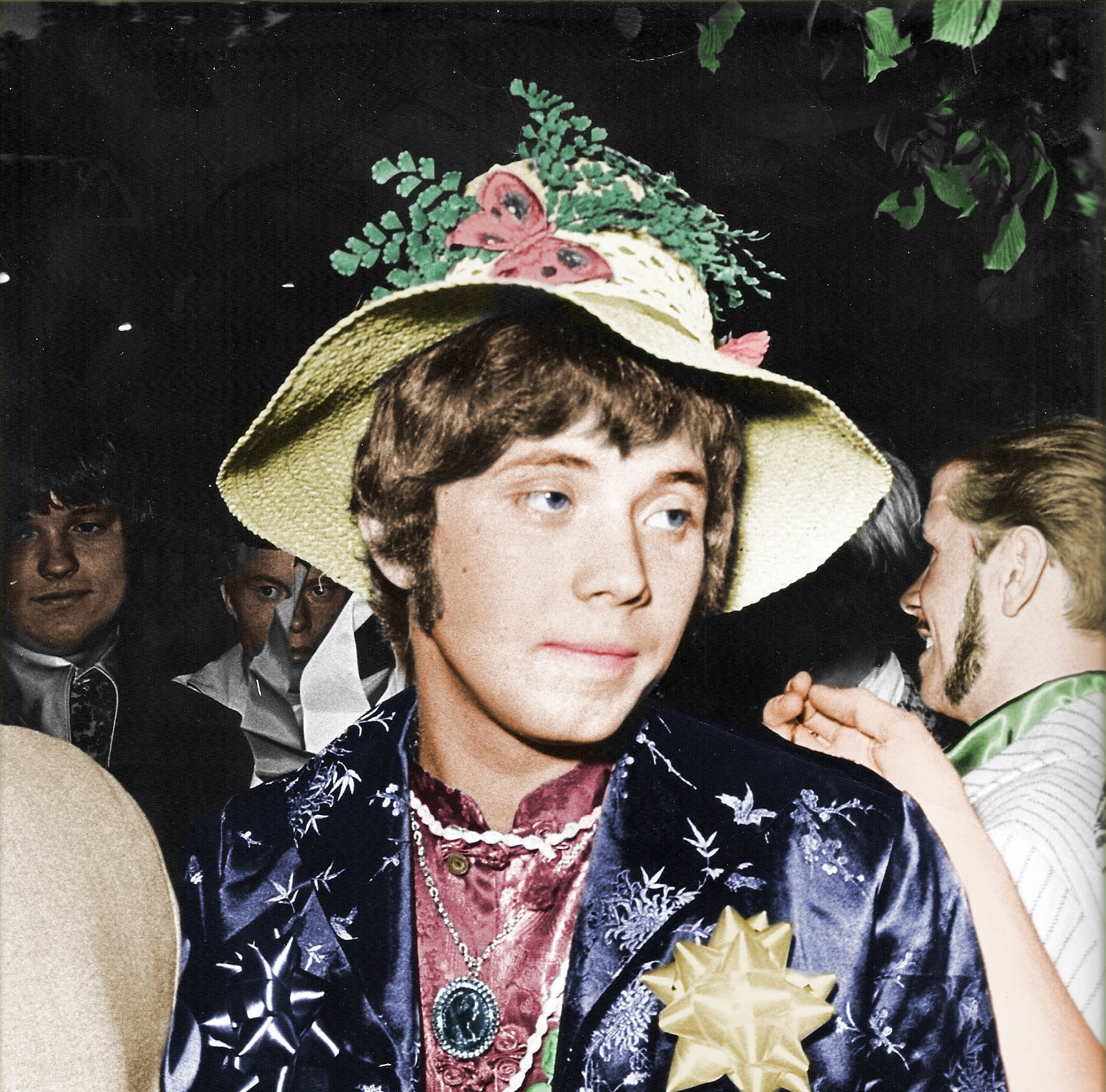
- Larsson in 1967

Background information
- Born: Dan Tage Larsson; 11 January 1948 (age 77)
- Origin: Gothenburg, Sweden
- Genres: Rock, pop
- Occupation: Musician
- Instruments: Guitar; keyboards
- Years active: 1964–1969
- Labels: Platina; Parlophone; Fontana

Dan "Danne" Tage Bexér (né Larsson; born 11 January 1948) is a Swedish singer-songwriter, guitarist and businessman who is best known for being the rhythm guitarist in the Swedish rock band Tages, and subsequently Blond, between 1963 and 1969. Additionally, Larsson briefly played keyboards with the group and gave them their name. Though not a very prolific songwriter for the group, he provided them with some of their more well-known songs and also sang on several tracks. After the group broke up, Larsson left Sweden to become a businessman in various countries across Europe, including Spain and France, where he currently still resides.

== Early life ==
Dan Tage Larsson was born on 11 January 1948 in Gothenburg, Sweden. He became interested in music at a young age and started partaking in piano lessons once a week. During this time, he became acquainted with Göran Lagerberg who attended the same school as him. Larsson quickly became bored with the piano lessons as he thought the teacher was "extremely boring". Instead, he picked up the guitar and doubled the lessons to twice a week. His parents also bought him a drum kit as a birthday gift and he quickly started playing that as well. He then played in his first group, East End Jazzband, eventually meeting guitarist Anders Töpel in Kullavik.

== Tages ==
During the summer of 1963, when Larsson was only 15 years old, Töpel invited him to join Alberts Skiffelgrupp, which at the time only consisted of him and Tommy Blom. At the time, the group was caught up in the skiffle craze, and as a result, Larsson suggested they invite Lagerberg to play the washboard. After they became a quintet, a name change was quickly proposed. They decided to use one of the members' middle names as a band name. Töpel's middle name, Per-Inge, was ruled out as it was considered "too lame", as was Lagerberg's Bertil. This left only Larsson's middle name, Tage, as a viable alternative. Larsson, whose middle name had been taken from his father, accepted this. The group members all agreed that this was "perfectly lame" and stuck with the group, eventually becoming Tages Skiffelgrupp.

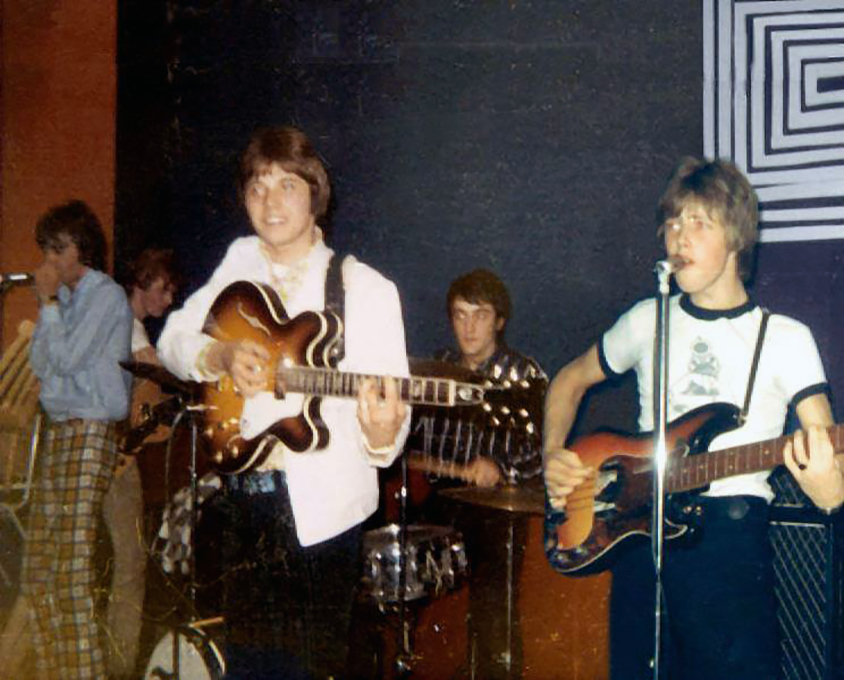
Larsson (middle) performing with Tages in 1966

For the rest of 1963, the group played skiffle, but by Christmas of that year, the group decided to follow in the footsteps of Beatlemania and become a beat group instead. After recruiting drummer Freddie Skantze, Larsson signed a contract for an electric guitar, which would become his primary instrument for the remainder of his career in the group. Unlike many other Swedish groups, who had one lead singer, the members of Tages were each was allowed at least one lead vocal per show, often harmonizing. This included Larsson, who often would get lead vocals during primarily rhythm and blues numbers. Larsson, together with the band, achieved nationwide fame after winning a contest in Liseburg called Västkustens Beatles, in which Larsson sang harmony parts and generally played a larger part in.

Larsson remained in obscurity on the group's debut single, "Sleep Little Girl", as he did not contribute to it vocally, nor did he write it or its B-side, "Tell Me You're Mine". However, the following single, "I Should Be Glad", increased Larsson's popularity as he co-wrote it with Lagerberg and provided harmony vocals. He also composed and sang the B-side, "I Cry", with Lagerberg. The most important song that Larsson wrote for the band was arguably "The One For You", which he wrote alone. The song was a large departure from the group's earlier, softer sound and began a very fruitful and successful collaboration with producer Anders Henriksson. The song was praised by Chuck Berry who called it the best song he had heard in Sweden.

In mid-1965, Larsson looked to branch out from the group's regular sound, and began experimenting with various keyboard instruments, most notably the electric organ. The first song which featured his keyboard playing was a rendition of Ritchie Valens' "Donna" that appeared on their debut extended play, Tages. Larsson made his solo vocal debut on the song as well, as all previous songs involving his vocals were largely harmonized with other band members.

However, for the rest of the band's career, Larsson would largely stay out of the spotlight, writing no more A-sides (excluding ones that were credited as group compositions), but did however compose and sing on their albums. Their second album, Tages 2, heavily features Larsson's keyboard playing, including piano, electric organ and the spinet. He composed and sang the title track on their third album, Extra Extra. After writing a few songs for their fourth album, Contrast, Larsson co-wrote five of the twelve tracks found on their fifth album, Studio, however he did not sing any lead vocals on the album. After Blom left the group in 1968, they continued on as a quartet, attempting to break through internationally. This resulted in them changing their name to Blond and releasing one album, The Lilac Years, which was recorded in March 1969 and features one of Larsson's compositions, "The Girl I Once Had", which he had written together with Adrian Moar and Kathe Green. However, both Töpel and Larsson had had enough by June of that year, leaving for the mandatory conscription Sweden had within a week of each other.

His work with the band was largely influential, with Lennart Wrigholm writing that he and Töpel were the best "radar pair guitarists" in Sweden.

== Later life ==
Following his time in Tages and Blond, Larsson was conscripted and served in the military for a few months, and following his discharge in 1970, decided not to return to a musical career. Instead, Larsson worked as a DJ on a Swedish radio station for a few months, and later became the manager of a nightclub called Spooky in Gothenburg. During this time, Larsson changed his last name to Bexér as this was a more unique last name than Larsson, and the fact that he wanted to avoid the publicity in the fact that he had been a member of Tages.

Bexér studied at the Stockholm School of Economics in Gothenburg during the 1970s and later became a businessman, opening several businesses involving the production of clothes. He purchased rights to famous brands such as My Little Pony and mascots such as Mickey Mouse, successfully using these rights to print clothes, and worked with that for the remainder of his career. He sold these businesses and retired, moving to France where he still resides to this day. He has on several occasions, however, returned to Sweden to partake in re-unions of Tages, visit former bandmates, and attend the funeral of Blom.

== Sources ==
- Brandels, Göran; Wrigholm, Lennart (2012). Boken om Tages: från Avenyn till Abbey Road. Premium Publishing. ISBN 978-91-89136-88-5.
- Wrigholm, Lennart (1991). "Tages: Makalös grej i Götet…". Now & Then.
