= Lalla Hansson =

Swedish progg, pop and rock singer (born 1944)

Lalla Lars Erik Hansson
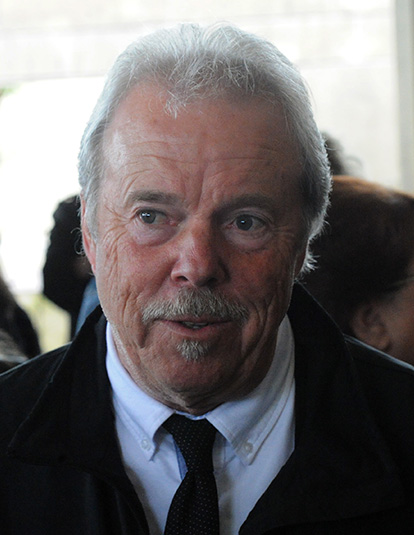

Background information
- Born: Stockholm, Sweden; 10 June 1944 (age 82)
- Genres: pop, rock
- Occupations: Singer

Lars Erik "Lalla" Hansson (born 10 June 1944) is a Swedish progg, pop and rock singer. He participates/has participated in the music groups Fabulous Four and Idolerna, and as solo singer he has had great prosperities with hits as "Anna och mej" ("Me and Bobby McGee"), "Han gav upp alltihop (för att spela med sitt band)" ("The Free Electric Band") and "Dagny".

== Selected discography ==
- Upp till Ragvaldsträsk
- Tur Och Retur
- Fångat i Flykten
- Enstaka Spår
- Hejdlöst
- Fabulous Forty
