= Lars Samuelson (musician) =

Swedish musician and music arranger (born 1935)

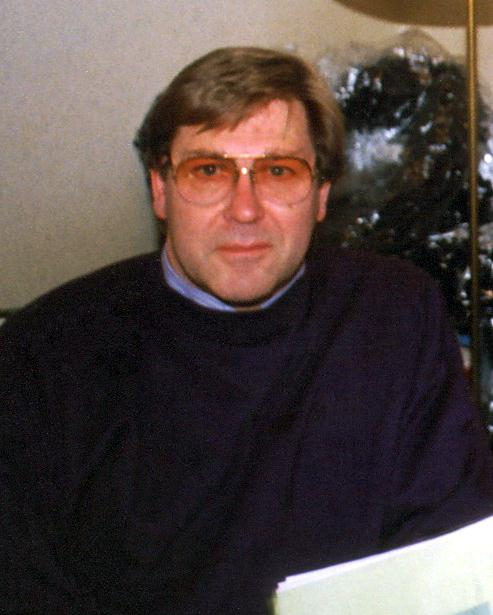
- Lars Samuelson in September 1993

Background information
- Born: 4 August 1935 (age 90)
- Origin: Sweden
- Occupation(s): conductor, musician
- Instrument: Trumpet

Lars "Lasse" Samuelson (born Lars Samuelsson on 4 August 1935) is a Swedish musician (trumpet) and music arranger.

Samuelson began his career in 1957 with playing with artists like Eva Engdahl, Seymour East Wall and Malte Johnson. In 1958 Samuelson participated in his first recording session, and in 1963 he started his first own band Swing Sing Seven. In 1965 he started The Dynamite Brass with his friend Jerry Williams. In the late 1960s and early 1970s, he worked a lot as a studio musician, producer and arranger. During the 1970s and 1980s Samuelson was also frequently engaged by television and radio, and participated in the Melodifestivalen several times both as conductor and arranger. He has participated as the conductor of the Swedish contribution to the Eurovision Song Contest on three occasions, in 1969, 1975 and 1979.
