= Tommy Blom =

Swedish singer, songwriter and musician

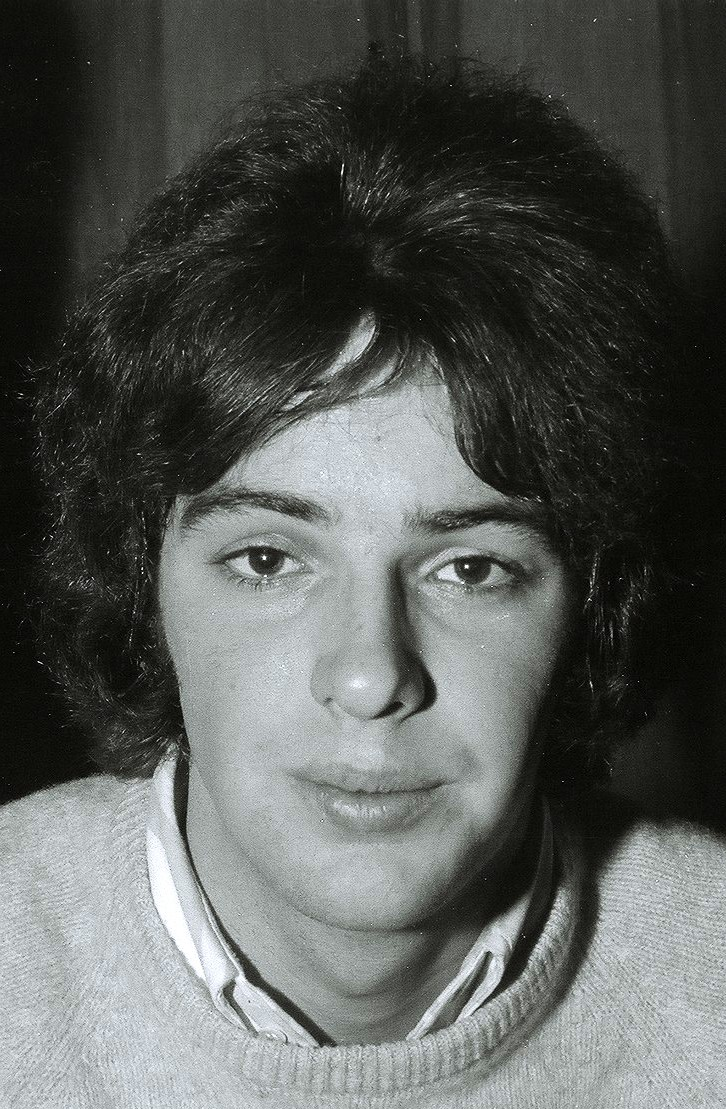
- Blom in 1967

Background information
- Born: Tommy Albert Blom; 3 March 1947; Gothenburg, Sweden
- Died: 25 May 2014 (aged 67) Stockholm, Sweden
- Occupations: Singer; songwriter; musician
- Formerly of: Tages; Idolerna
- Musical career
- Genres: Rock; pop
- Instruments: Vocals; guitar

Tommy Albert Blom (3 March 1947 – 25 May 2014) was a Swedish singer-songwriter, musician, radio presenter, and voice actor. He was the lead vocalist of the rock band Tages in the 1960s, and later a member of Idolerna ("The Idols") in the 1990s. He was later the voice of Mr. Krabs in the Swedish dub of the American television show SpongeBob SquarePants.

== Tages ==
Blom formed Tages in 1963, originally as a duo with Anders Topel. They performed with acoustic guitars during a regatta in Hovås, south of Gothenburg. Because of popular reception, the duo quickly recruited banjo player Danne Larsson, washboard player Göran Lagerberg, and performed as a skiffle group. They later decided to change to playing rock music, and Larrson switched to guitar, and Lagerberg to bass, and drummer Freddie Skantze was also added to the group.

Tages were one of the most successful Swedish bands of the 1960s. They achieved thirteen top-20 singles on Kvällstoppen, such as "Sleep Little Girl", "I Should Be Glad", "In My Dreams", and "Miss Mac Baren", as well as having two albums certified gold, Tages (1965) and Tages 2 (1966). Töpel was present during the Västkustens Beatles (West Coast Beatles) contest in August 1964, which propelled the band into stardom. Their first single, which became "Sleep Little Girl" (1964), was written by Blom.

Blom left Tages in 1968.

== Later work ==
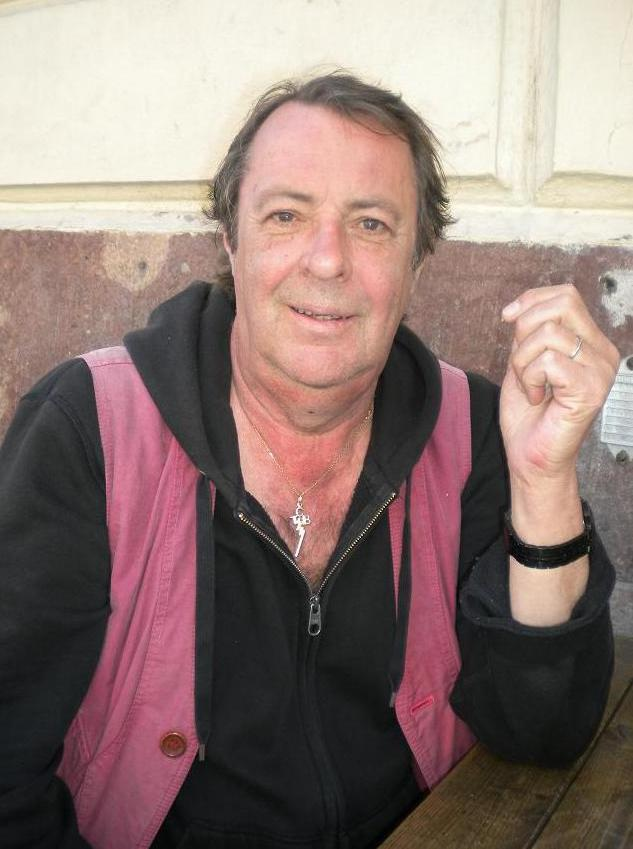
Blom in 2011

After leaving Tages, Blom started his solo career, and released a few singles between 1968 and 1970. His first single "You Can Find Some Here" was released in 1968, the second single "The Butterfly of Love" came out in 1969. During the 1970s, worked as a model with his wife Mai.

During the 70s, Blom handled bookings for Magnus Uggla. He was also a producer and court masters and performed as a troubadour at various entertainment venues. He then moved to Mallorca, and later returned to Sweden sometime in the late 1980s.

In the mid-1990s, he started hosting Vinyl 107. In 2008, he lost that job because "he was too old", but he returned in 2011. Every Sunday, 60-tals morgon, his programme with songs from the 1960s, was broadcast on Vinyl 107. Before he worked at Vinyl 107, he worked as a music teacher at the school Kvarnbäcksskolan in Haninge.

Blom was a member of the music groups Idolerna and The Cadillac band. He formed Idolerna with former 1960s Swedish pop singers Lalla Hansson, Svenne Hedlund, and Lennart Grahn, and in 2000, Idolerna's song "Här kommer kärleken" was nominated as "Årets låt på Svensktoppen" ("The Svensktoppen Song of this Year") and in 2001 they were nominated as "Årets svensktoppsartister" ("The Svensktoppen Singers of the Year").

In voice acting, Blom was best known for voicing Mr. Krabs in the Swedish dub of SpongeBob SquarePants until his death, including lending his voice to Mr. Krabs in The SpongeBob SquarePants Movie Swedish dub.

== Personal life and death ==
Tommy Albert Blom was born on 3 March 1947 in Gothenburg, Sweden. He befriended future Tages bandmate and co-founder Anders Töpel as a child. Blom was married to Mai Blom from 1969 until his death and had two sons.

Blom died on 25 May 2014 in Sweden aged 67. His cause of death was given as cancer. His funeral was held in Stockholm on 17 June 2014. Swedish pop stars such as bandmate Lalla Hansson, Svenne Hedlund, Claes af Geijerstam, Per Eggers, Örjan Ramberg were in attendance.

== See also ==
- Tommy Blom discography at Discogs
- Tommy Blom at IMDb
- Tommy Blom image on Wikimedia Commons
- Tommy Blom - in memoriam
