= I Should Be Glad =

Single by Tages
- B-side: "I Cry"
- Released: 15 February 1965
- Recorded: 30 December 1964
- Studio: Metronome, Stockholm, Sweden
- Genre: Beat; soft rock
- Length: 2:17
- Label: Platina
- Songwriters: Göran Lagerberg; Danne Larsson
- Producer: Rune Wallebom

Tages singles chronology
"Sleep Little Girl" (1964)	"I Should Be Glad" (1965)	"Don't Turn Your Back" (1965)

"I Should Be Glad" is a song by the Swedish rock band Tages, written by bassist Göran Lagerberg and rhythm guitarist Danne Larsson in 1964. Following bad press for their debut single "Sleep Little Girl", the group quickly recorded a follow-up which critics would consider good.

The song was the second of three singles by the group to employ a similar sound; heavily involving acoustic guitars combined with positive lyrics. It nonetheless met positive reception among fans, reaching number two on both Kvällstoppen and Tio i Topp during the early months of 1965.

== Background and recording ==
On 16 October 1964, Tages released their debut single, "Sleep Little Girl". This single became a hit for the band, much to the surprise of their members, who thought nothing much of it. It reached number four on Kvällstoppen and went all the way to number one on Tio i Topp during the later parts of 1964. "Sleep Little Girl" was re-pressed in January 1965 due to its popularity, eventually becoming the group's best selling single. However, the song's composer, lead singer Tommy Blom, received negative attention from critics, who deemed that the success of the single was based primarily on the group's "cute" appearance rather than the quality of the songwriting. In retrospect, Göran Brandels and Lennart Wrigholm wrote that "almost no Swedish group garnered as much negative criticism for a debut single as Tages did."

This criticism had a large impact on the group, and they began writing more songs in order to evolve their craft. The group's bassist Göran Lagerberg and rhythm guitarist Danne Larsson sat down and wrote "I Should Be Glad" together. Wrigholm describes the song as being in the Merseybeat style, heavily influenced by the English groups the Searchers and Gerry and the Pacemakers, who were both around their peak popularity in the UK and Sweden towards the end of 1964. On 30 December 1964, the group traveled to Stockholm to record the single after their record label Platina had booked studio time. As Platina had no studio of their own, Metronome Studios was booked, with former Violents guitarist Rune Wallebom as the producer. Four songs were cut during this session: "I Should Be Glad", "I Cry", and re-recordings of both "Sleep Little Girl" and "Tell Me You're Mine", the A- and B-sides of their debut single.

== Release ==
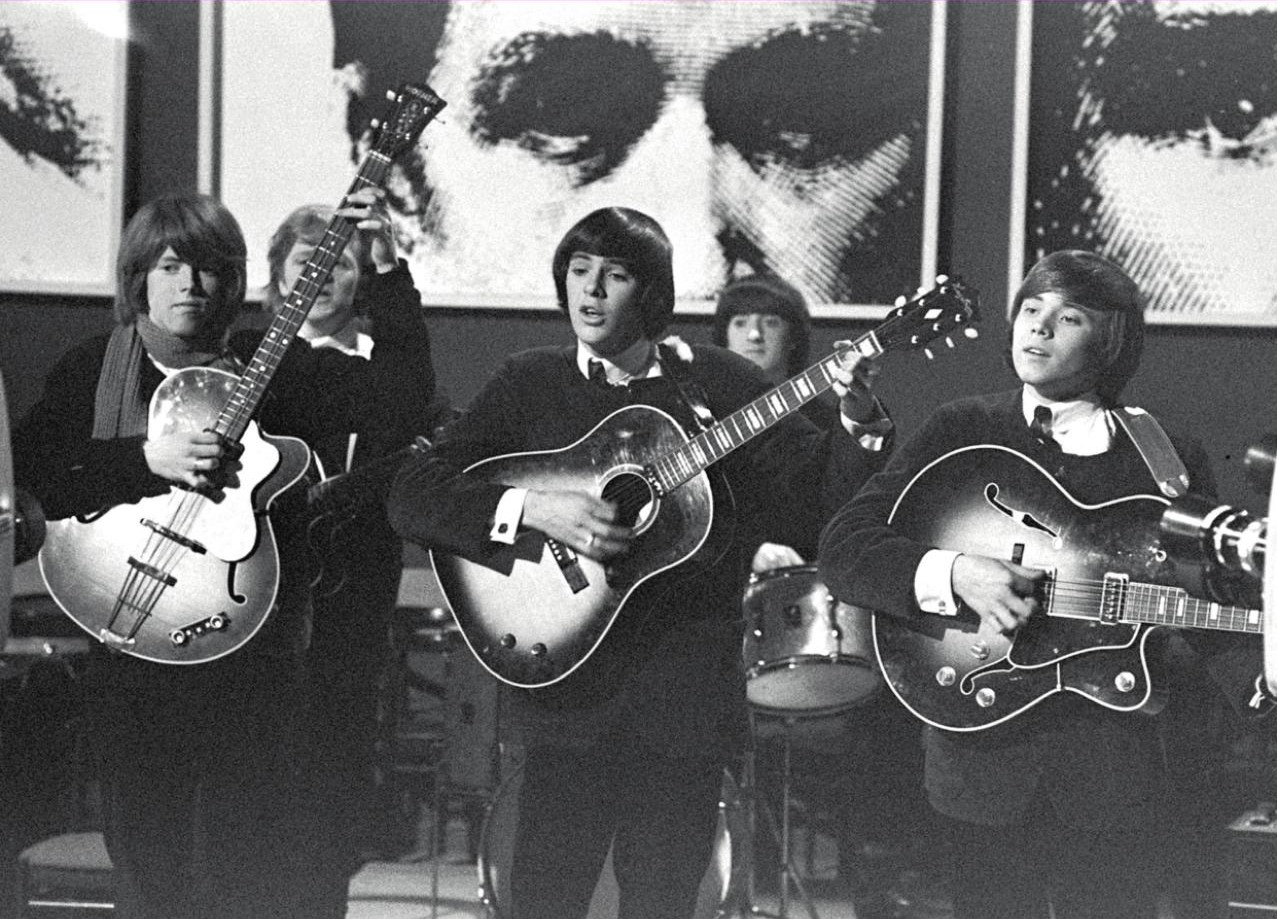
Tages performing the song on Drop-In.

On 14 February 1965, the group made their official television debut on Swedish Television. They appeared on Drop-In, a show most famous for the appearance of the Beatles and later starting the career of the Hep Stars. On the show, the group performed both "Sleep Little Girl" and "I Should Be Glad", which had yet to be released. The show turned out to be a huge success from fans and critics alike, upon which Platina released "I Should Be Glad" as the band's second single the following day. The B-side chosen was "I Cry", also written and harmonized by Lagerberg and Larsson. Due to the success the single would get, it was eventually re-pressed in November 1965, with a re-recording of "I Cry" as its B-side and an alternate picture sleeve.

"I Should Be Glad" became a huge commercial success on both of Sweden's record charts, Kvällstoppen and Tio i Topp. It entered Kvällstoppen on 23 February at a position of ten, before reaching number two on 9 March, a position it held for four consecutive weeks. It was last seen on the chart on 4 May at a position of 17. It spent a total of 11 weeks on the chart, nine of which were in the top-ten and seven in the top-five. On Tio i Topp it was also successful, being voted in at number four on 20 February. It peaked at number two the following week, a position it would hold for four weeks. It was last seen on 10 April of that year at a position of 13, spending a total of seven weeks on the chart. "I Should Be Glad" was the first of three singles by the group to chart in Finland, reaching number 37 in March of that year.

Neither "I Should Be Glad" or its B-side were included on any studio albums the group released during the 1960s. It would eventually be released on two EPs during this time: Sleep Little Girl (which combined both sides of the group's two first singles) on 30 August 1966 and, following the group's contract with Platina expiring in 1967, Hits Volym 1 in August 1967. That same month, a compilation album named The Best Of Tages was released, which included "I Should Be Glad" as the fifth track. The track's first release on compact disc was on a CD-reissue of a compilation album named Tages, 1964–1968!, released on 18 November 1992, where the song was the second track. Both sides of the single would eventually be released on the This One's For You Box Set, released on 28 November 1964 together with all of the group's other recordings.

== Charts ==
Weekly chart performance for "I Should Be Glad"
Chart (1965)	Peak position
Finland (Suomen virallinen lista)	37
Sweden (Kvällstoppen)	2
Sweden (Tio i Topp)	2

== Sources ==
- Brandels, Göran; Wrigholm, Lennart (2012). Boken om Tages: från Avenyn till Abbey Road. Premium Publishing. ISBN 978-91-89136-88-5.
- Wrigholm, Lennart (1991). "Tages: Makalös grej i Götet…". Now & then.
