= Anders Töpel =

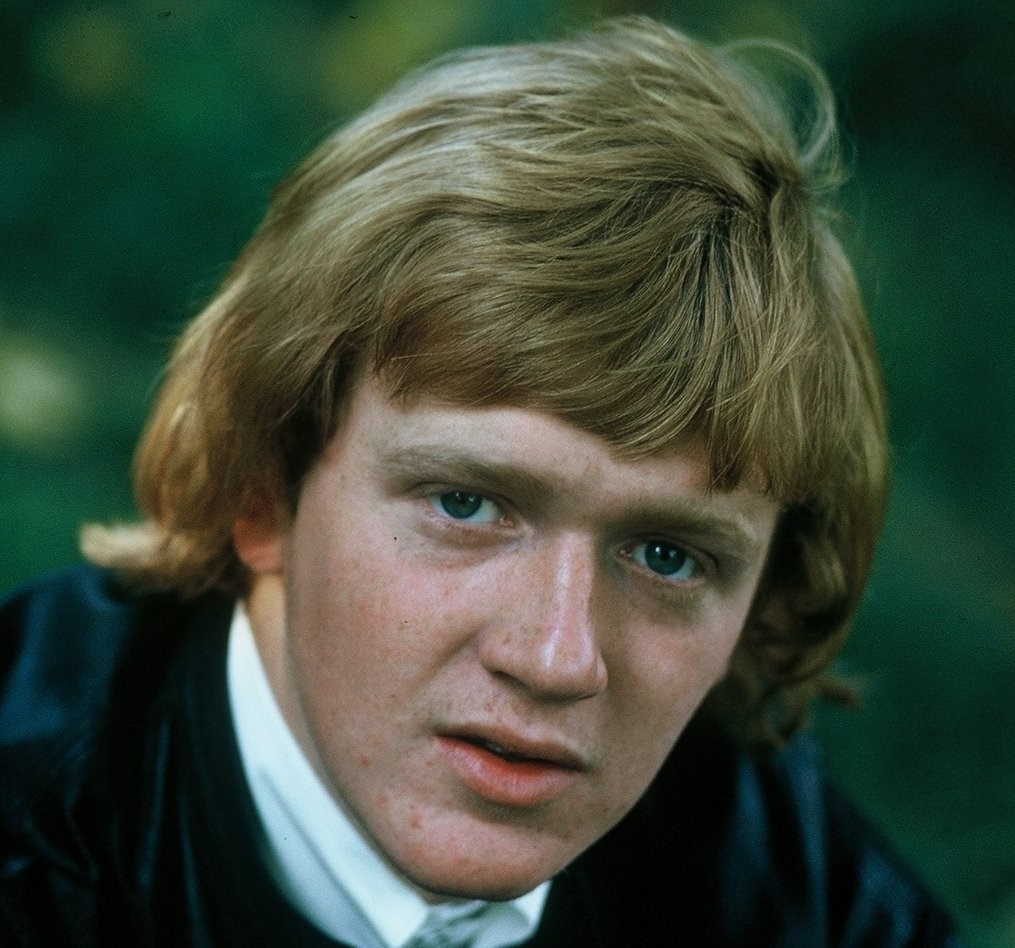
- Töpel in 1965

Background information
- Born: Per-Inge Anders Töpel; 16 January 1947; Gothenburg, Sweden
- Died: 10 April 2014 (aged 67) Kullavik, Halland, Sweden
- Genres: Rock; pop
- Instruments: Guitar; vocals
- Years active: 1963–1970s
- Labels: Platina; Parlophone; Fontana

Per-Inge Anders Töpel (16 January 1947 – 10 April 2014) was a Swedish guitarist, best known for being the lead guitarist of the Swedish rock group Tages.

== Early life ==
Töpel was born in Gothenburg, Sweden. He befriended Tommy Blom as a child. Töpel received his first acoustic guitar while in his early teens. He graduated from school in June 1965, while his career in Tages was in full action.

== Tages ==
Töpel formed Tages together with his friend Tommy Blom during the summer of 1963 when they performed with acoustic guitars during a regatta in Hovås, south of Gothenburg. Because of popular reception, the duo quickly recruited guitarist Danne Larsson and Göran Lagerberg on washboard (later bass guitar) while starting to play skiffle together. After recruiting drummer Freddie Skantze to the line-up, the band quickly turned electrical and started performing in the style of the Beatles.

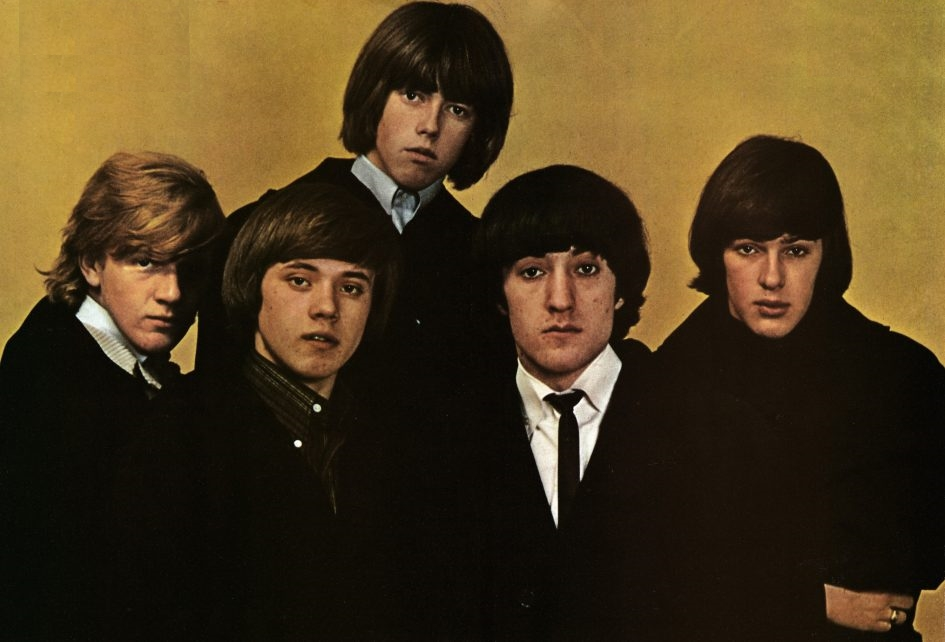
Tages in 1965 (Töpel on the left)

The name Tages comes from the middle name of the groups guitarist, Danne Larsson. The band chose Larsson's because they thought it was “the cheesiest name”.

Töpel was present during the Västkustens Beatles (West Coast Beatles) contest in August 1964, which propelled the band into stardom. Their first single, which became "Sleep Little Girl" (1964), was written by Blom. Töpel's playing is present on all tracks Tages recorded between 1964 and 1968, primarily on lead guitar.

Most of his compositions for the group were co-written with other group members, which included; "Tell Me You're Mine", "Hey Mama" and the hit "Don't Turn Your Back". "Don't Turn Your Back" was the only hit record by the band that Töpel sang a lead vocal on.

Töpel left Tages (now going under the name Blond) in 1969.

== Personal life and death ==
After exiting Tages, Töpel went through his mandatory military service within the Swedish Air Defence Regiment until he was discharged in 1970. Following his discharge from the military, he joined another band called Fyran, with Freddie Skantze. After Fyran split, he retired from the music industry and worked as a harbourmaster in the Port of Gothenburg.

Töpel was diagnosed with blood cancer during the early 2000s. He recovered, however, the cancer returned a few years later and Töpel eventually died on 10 April 2014, aged 67. At the time he was living in Kullavik, south of Gothenburg.

== See also ==
- Tages discography

== Sources ==
- Brandels, Göran; Wrigholm, Lennart (2012). Boken om Tages: från Avenyn till Abbey Road. Premium Publishing. ISBN 978-91-89136-88-5.
- Wrigholm, Lennart (1991). "Tages: Makalös grej i Götet…". Now & then.
