= Sleep Little Girl =

1964 Tages song

Single by Tages

from the album Tages
- B-side: "Tell Me You're Mine"
- Released: 16 October 1964
- Recorded: 20 September 1964
- Venue: Nylöse youth center, Gothenburg, Sweden
- Genre: Folk rock; soft rock
- Length: 2:30
- Label: Platina
- Songwriter: Tommy Blom
- Producer: Evert Jakobsson

Tages singles chronology
"Sleep Little Girl" (1964)	"I Should Be Glad" (1965)

"Sleep Little Girl" is the debut single by the Swedish rock band Tages. It was written by Tommy Blom and released on 16 October 1964. The initial recording was made at a Youth center at Nylöse, a neighborhood of Gothenburg, Sweden's second biggest city, and the song has professionally been re-recorded in a studio twice.

The song became a hit upon release, reaching number one on Tio i Topp and number two on Kvällstoppen, and one of the re-recorded renditions was later included on their debut album Tages. "Sleep Little Girl" became one of Tages's biggest hits, and is, along with "Miss Mac Baren", considered to be their signature song.

== Background and recording ==
Previous to recording "Sleep Little Girl", Tages had gained traction around the Gothenburg area of Sweden. At the time, the band mostly played at private parties, but had eventually started gaining popularity and gained bookings for clubs across the city. Tages were offered a recording contract in August, when they signed up for a contest named "Västkustens Beatles" ("West coast's Beatles"), which was active in between 13–17 August. Blom was at the time at a vacation in London, United Kingdom to improve his English skills, meaning that Tages performed as a quartet, which was the requirement. Tages won the contest, garnering almost half of the votes, and as a result were awarded with a recording contract and a recording session.

"Sleep Little Girl" follows the story of a man, who is walking at night with a friend on their way to his girlfriend's home, only to reveal that she is in a deep sleep state. Annoyed at this, the duo starts throwing rocks at her window, to no avail. The narrator, furious about this, picks up a big stone intending to throw it at the window, but instead misses and lands on the roof, causing loud sounds to erupt. The song is notable for featuring several grammatically incorrect phrases and sentences, and features a Swedish idiom in the second verse. According to Blom, the lyrics were based on a real incident that he had been part of.

The group initially attempted to record "Sleep Little Girl" on 20 September 1964, when they entered the cellar of Nylöse youth center, which had been transformed into a makeshift recording studio, where the group recorded "Sleep Little Girl", "Tell Me You're Mine" along with another, unidentified song. This version became the initial single release, and is probably the most well-known rendition of the song. A second single version was recorded on December 30, 1964, along with their second single "I Should Be Glad". This version was first issued in January 1965, when the single was re-pressed due to the massive success it achieved. The third and final version was recorded somewhere between 5–6 October 1965, almost a year after the original version was released. This version was included on their debut album.

== Release ==
"Sleep Little Girl" was initially released on 16 October 1964 by Platina Records with the catalogue number PA 102. It was the second release on Platina, after Glenn Jones "About Rita". The B-side of the song was "Tell Me You're Mine", which was written by lead guitarist Anders Töpel and bass guitarist Göran Lagerberg, and is sung by Lagerberg. "Tell Me You're Mine" was later also re-recorded by the band later, most likely at the 30 December 1964 session. The initial version of the song is less refined due to the unideal recording studio, and lacks the bass breaks which occurs on the later version. This version was only issued as the B-side of the 1964 release of the single, while the second version substituted it for the re-release in January 1965. This version has never received an official digital release, and remains among the rarer tracks recorded by Tages.

The song first entered Kvällstoppen on 1 December 1964 at a position of number 11. The following week, it had breached the top-5 for the first time, at a position of number 4. It reached its peak on 15 December at a position of number 3, where it stayed for one week. The following week it had once again ascended to number 4, where it stayed for four weeks. On 19 January 1965 it had once again ascended to number 5, where it stayed for two weeks. Following this, it exited the top-5 at number 8, a position it held for two weeks. On 16 February, it had exited the top-10 at number 12 and the week after that it was at number 16. On 2 March it was at number 19 and was last seen the following week, at number 20, before dropping off. In total, the single spent fifteen weeks on the chart, ten of which were in the top-10 and eight of which were in the top-5. The song was also very successful on Tio i Topp, where it reached the top position. It stayed on the chart for a total of eleven weeks before being voted off.

The single's reception was mixed, with many finding it "too lame", even by the Swedish standards of 1964. Blom, the composer, called the song "generic". In a retrospective review for AllMusic, Richie Unterberger called the song a "mild original".

== Personnel ==
- Tommy Blom – lead vocals
- Danne Larsson – rhythm guitar
- Anders Töpel – lead guitar
- Göran Lagerberg – backing vocals, bass guitar
- Freddie Skantze – drums

== Charts ==
Chart (1964)	Peak position
Sweden (Kvällstoppen)	3
Sweden (Tio i Topp)	1
