= Tages (band) =

Swedish rock band, active 1963–1969

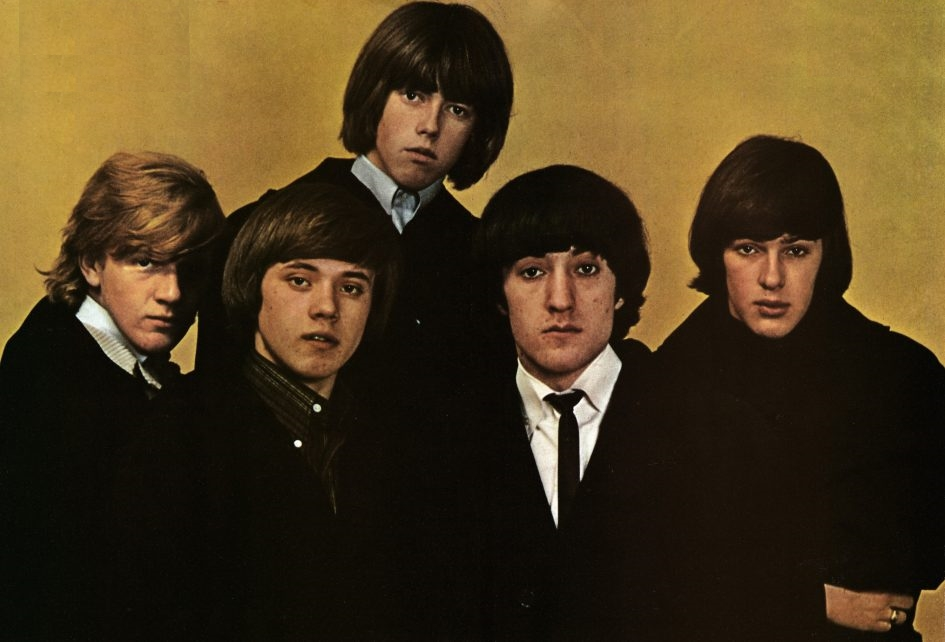
- Tages in 1965; from left to right: Anders Töpel, Danne Larsson, Göran Lagerberg, Freddie Skantze and Tommy Blom

Background information
- Also known as: Blond
- Origin: Gothenburg, Sweden
- Genres: Rock; pop
- Years active: 1963–1969
- Labels: Platina; Parlophone; Fontana
- Past members: Tommy Blom; Göran Lagerberg; Danne Larsson; Anders Töpel; Freddie Skantze; (see Personnel section for others)
- Website: tages.nu

Tages were a Swedish rock band formed in Gothenburg in 1963. The group, whose original line-up consisted of Tommy Blom, Göran Lagerberg, Danne Larsson, Anders Töpel and Freddie Skantze, were one of the most successful Swedish bands of the 1960s. They achieved thirteen top-20 singles on Kvällstoppen, such as "Sleep Little Girl", "I Should Be Glad", "In My Dreams", and "Miss Mac Baren", as well as having two albums certified gold, Tages (1965) and Tages 2 (1966).

Tages began their recording career as a beat band, heavily influenced and inspired by the Beatles. Initially, the group garnered much criticism from other musicians, who considered them inexperienced. This led to them quickly developing as a group, drawing influences from British mod artists, specifically Small Faces and, like them, were the center of their country's male fashion from 1965 onward. The band would cover songs from artists virtually unknown in Sweden, such as John Lee Hooker, Willie Dixon and Muddy Waters, but also from competitors, such as the Everly Brothers, the Easybeats and Small Faces.

Between 1965 and 1967, Tages recorded five studio albums, including Extra Extra (1966), which was amongst the first psychedelic rock albums recorded. During the later part of their career, Tages pioneered a genre of music combining elements of Swedish folk music with contemporary rock music. In doing so, the group recorded their final studio album, simply titled Studio (1967), which contains solely original material and has often been considered among the best Swedish albums of the 1960s. In mid-late 1968, Blom departed the band, after which they renamed themselves Blond. After a line-up change leaving Lagerberg as the only remaining original member, they released one album, The Lilac Years, on the Fontana label in 1969.

== History ==
=== 1963–1964: Formation and breakthrough ===
In the summer of 1963, Tommy Blom and Anders Töpel started a skiffle group, originally named Alberts Skifflegrupp after Blom's middle name. Töpel invited Danne Larsson to join the band, who suggested they also invite Göran Lagerberg to play the washboard. The quartet then renamed themselves Tages Skifflegrupp after Larsson's middle name, Tage, hoping the unusual name would help them stand out. The group initially sang mainly sing-along songs. They usually performed at private events, but occasionally were scheduled to play at venues. In October of that year, the group entered a talent show called "Oktobersmällen" ("The October Bang"). The band was flat out panned by the jury, and ended up last place. However, it gave them their first major performance, at Kungälv Folkpark.

By early 1964, Tages Skifflegrupp had changed their name to simply Tages, as they quickly ventured away from skiffle due to the impact of Beatlemania. Lagerberg received a bass guitar as a Christmas present and the other members purchased electric guitars of their own. After recruiting drummer Freddie Skantze, Tages became a beat group.

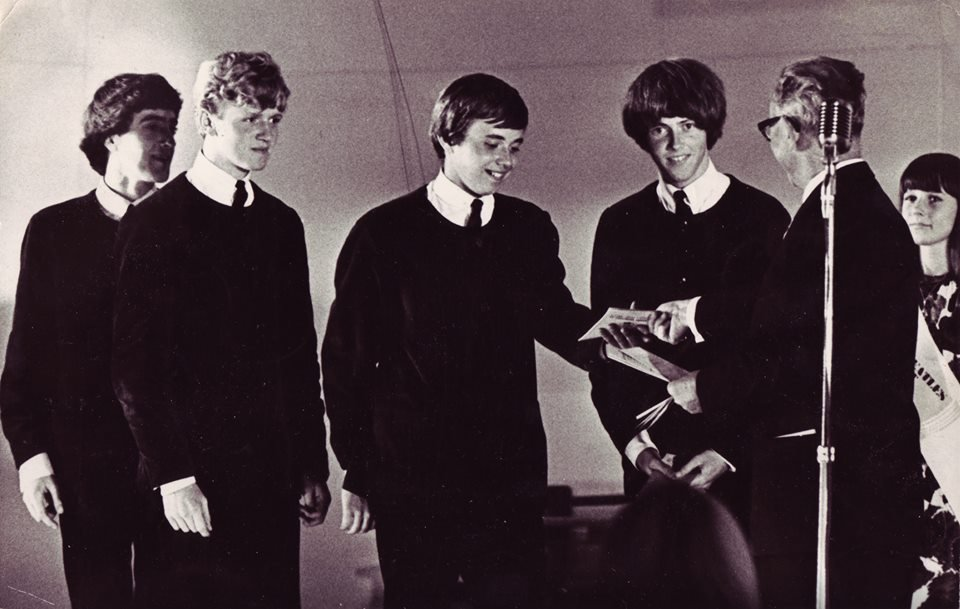
Tages receiving the prize for the West Coast's Beatles competition, 16 August 1964

The group caught their first break during 13–17 August 1964, when they signed up for Göteborgs-Posten's contest "Västkustens Beatles" ("The West Coast's Beatles"). The concept behind this was to sound similarly to the Beatles, with a requirement of four members. The prize was a free recording session to the victor. Tages however, consisted of five members at the time. This problem was solved since Blom was in London at the time, a two-week vacation he took to improve his English skills, while connecting with other people at a Youth Hostel. Without Blom, Lagerberg, Larsson, Töpel and Skantze successfully made Tages into a quartet. They won the contest, garnering 600 votes out of the 1300 voting members of the audience.

Blom had by now returned to Sweden, and the band were authorized to record their first single. For this release, they chose to record a song which was written by Blom, "Sleep Little Girl". The first recording of the song was not recorded at a professional studio, but rather at Nylöse Ungdomsgård, where a makeshift studio had been created in the cellar. The group entered the studio on 20 September 1964 to record the song. The song features Blom on lead vocals, while Larsson plays the acoustic guitar. Lagerberg sings backing vocals on the recording. The single was released on 16 October 1964, by independent record label Platina Records. "Sleep Little Girl" became an immediate smash hit. It reached number 3 on Kvällstoppen in December 1964, and topped radio chart Tio i Topp, staying eleven weeks on that chart. Due to its massive success, "Sleep Little Girl" was re-issued in January 1965.

== Personnel ==
Classic line-up

- Tommy Blom – vocals, guitars, harmonica (1963–1968; died 2014)
- Göran Lagerberg – vocals, bass (1963–1969)
- Danne Larsson – vocals, guitars (1963–1969)
- Anders Töpel – guitars, vocals (1963–1969; died 2014)
- Freddie Skantze – drums, percussion (1963–1966)

== Discography ==
- Tages (1965)
- Tages 2 (1966)
- Extra Extra (1966)
- Contrast (1967)
- Studio (1967)

As Blond

- The Lilac Years (1969)

== Sources ==
- Brandels, Göran; Wrigholm, Lennart (2012). Boken om Tages: från Avenyn till Abbey Road. Premium Publishing. ISBN 978-91-89136-88-5.
- Englund, Magnus (Summer 1988). "An interview with Tommy Blom". Ugly Things (7). Archived from the original on 5 June 2020.
- Wrigholm, Lennart (1991). "Tages: Makalös grej i Götet…". Now & then.
