= List of songs recorded by Tages =

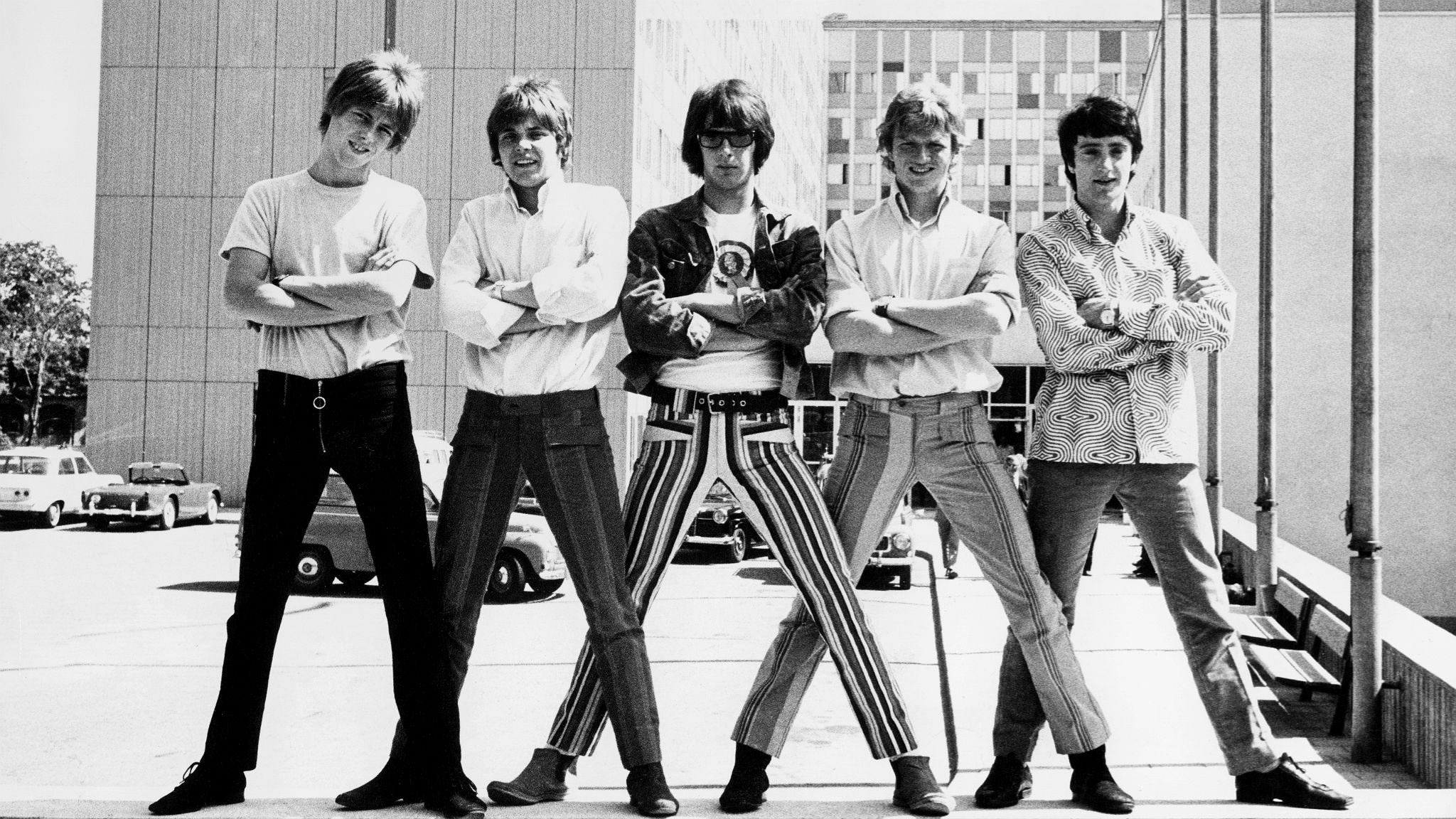
Tages in 1966; from left to right: Göran Lagerberg, Danne Larsson, Tommy Blom, Anders Töpel and Freddie Skantze.

Tages were a Swedish pop band from Gothenburg who recorded hundreds of songs throughout their career. The group's "main catalogue"—songs released on albums, EPs or singles between 1964 and 1970—consists of 94 songs; 53 originals and 41 covers. In addition to their main catalogue, Tages also recorded a further 20 songs that were released in one form or another including both live performances and studio recordings. The band re-united multiple times between 1971 and 2006, with performances from a variety of shows being taped and individual songs released. Starting with August 1965's "The One for You", all recordings until their dissolution during the summer of 1970 were produced by EMI staff producer Anders Henriksson, who also co-wrote a large output of the band's music alongside playing keyboard instruments and composing string- and woodwind arrangements for the band. The band's studio output was almost exclusively recorded at the Europafilm studio in Mariehäll, Stockholm, but some of the early tracks were recorded at EMI's studio on Gärdet, Stockholm.

All of the group's members contributed to songwriting in some capacity. Starting in 1967, the primary songwriters were the partnership between Henriksson and group bassist Göran Lagerberg, who wrote material for the albums Contrast, Studio (both 1967) and The Lilac Years (1969). Lagerberg, either with other members or alone, also penned several early singles for Tages, including "I Should Be Glad", "Don't Turn Your Back" (both 1965). Henriksson also wrote a few tracks for the band together with outside songwriters, such as Thorstein Bergman or Bengt Palmers. (Note: On these songs, Henriksson and Bergman are credited under their pseudonyms F. Akon and F. Thokon, respectively.) Lead vocalist Tommy Blom penned the band's debut single "Sleep Little Girl" (1964) and composed several other singles and album tracks, particularly with the help of rhythm guitarist Danne Larsson. Lead guitarist Anders Töpel co-wrote songs with Blom or Lagerberg, including "Don't Turn Your Back". Drummers Freddie Skantze, Tommy Tausis and Lasse Svensson were solely credited on group compositions. The originals on Tages 2 are credited to all five members of the group, as are two tracks from Studio: "Seeing With Love" and "She's Having a Baby Now". With the exception of Studio and The Lilac Years, all of the band's albums featured cover versions, reflecting their eclectic repertoire from rhythm and blues ("Dimples", "I Got My Mojo Working") to contemporary pop songs ("Friday on My Mind", "Understanding").

The band were formed as a satirical skiffle band in 1963, but shortly abandoned that gimmick in favor of performing beat music after the Beatles started rising in popularity. The group's early singles were characterized by a soft rock sound influenced by Gerry and the Pacemakers and the Searchers ("Sleep Little Girl", "I Should Be Glad", "Don't Turn Your Back"). Starting with "The One For You", the band's music started branching out in various genres, including folk rock (Tages 2), soul pop (Extra Extra, Contrast), psychedelic rock (Contrast, Studio)

== Main songs ==
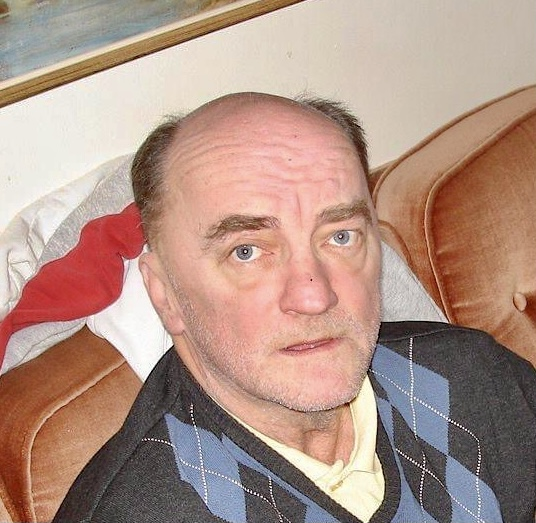
Producer Anders "Henkan" Henriksson produced every Tages and Blond recording from "The One for You" (1965) onwards. Starting in 1966, he additionally co-wrote 23 songs recorded by the band.

Between 1964 and 1970, Tages songs were released on various music formats, primarily on 7-inch singles or on LP record albums. Of the 52 tracks the band released as either A-sides or B-sides, 21 were standalone non-album singles, whereas the remaining songs were either lifted from the group's studio albums or later included on them. (Note: Tages' debut single "Sleep Little Girl" (1964) was recorded by the band three times. The first two recordings ended up on singles and EPs, whilst the third and final recording was included on their debut album Tages in November 1965.) 14 tracks that the band released in 1969 and 1970 – a studio album with 12 songs and a single with a further two songs – were issued under the band name Blond, as it was more internationally viable. Thus, the band has a "core" catalogue of six studio albums even though the final one bears another band name:

- Tages (1965)
- Tages 2 (1966)
- Extra Extra (1966)
- Contrast (1967)
- Studio (1967)
- The Lilac Years (1969)

In addition, starting with 1967's The Best of Tages, several compilation album also collect Tages' non-album singles. These include Tages, 1964-1968! (1983) and Go! The Complete Singles (2015).

Key
†	Indicates Swedish single release (A- and B sides)
‡	Indicates songs not written or co-written by the members of Tages

Name of song, writer(s), original release, and year of release
Song	Writer(s)	Original release	Year	Ref.
"(I Will Bring You) Flowers In The Morning"	John Cameron ‡	The Lilac Years	1969	
"Bloodhound" †	Larry Bright ‡	Tages	1965	
"Caroline"	Anders Henriksson; Göran Lagerberg; Adrian Moar; Lasse Svensson	The Lilac Years	1969	
"Cathy's Clown"	Don Everly ‡	Tages	1965	
"Crazy 'Bout My Baby" †	Robert Mosely ‡	Tages 2	1966	
"Created By You"	Claes Dieden ‡	Studio	1967	
"Dancing in the Street" †	Marvin Gaye; William Stevenson ‡	Tages 2	1966	
"Deep Inside My Heart"	Anders Henriksson; Göran Lagerberg; Kathe Green	The Lilac Years	1969	
"Dimples" †	John Lee Hooker ‡	Tages	1965	
"Dirty Mind"	Tommy Blom; Göran Lagerberg; Danne Larsson; Freddie Skantze; Anders Töpel	Tages 2	1966	
"Doctor Feel-Good" †	Curtis Smith ‡	Tages	1965	
"Don't Turn Your Back" †	Göran Lagerberg; Anders Töpel	Non-album single	1965	
"Donna"	Ritchie Valens ‡	Tages (EP)	1965	
"Every Raindrop Means A Lot" †	Tommy Blom; Göran Lagerberg; Danne Larsson; Lasse Svensson; Anders Töpel	Contrast	1967	
"Everybody Loves a Lover"	Richard Adler; Robert Allen ‡	Tages	1965	
"Extra"	Anders Henriksson; Danne Larsson	Extra Extra	1966	
"Fantasy Island" †	Anders Henriksson; Göran Lagerberg; Danne Larsson	Non-album single	1968	
"Forget Him"	Tommy Blom	Tages (EP)	1965	
"Friday on My Mind" †	George Young; Harry Vanda ‡	Extra Extra	1966	
"Fuzzy Patterns" †	Tommy Blom	Contrast	1967	
"Get Out Of My Life, Woman"	Allen Toussaint ‡	Tages 2	1966	
"Get Up An' Get Goin'" †	Anders Henriksson; Thorstein Bergman ‡	Extra Extra	1966	
"Go" †	Tommy Blom; Göran Lagerberg; Danne Larsson; Freddie Skantze; Anders Töpel	Tages 2	1966	
"Gone Too Far" †	Göran Lagerberg	Extra Extra	1966	
"Guess Who"	Tommy Blom; Göran Lagerberg; Danne Larsson; Freddie Skantze; Anders Töpel	Tages 2	1966	
"Halcyon Days" †	Andy Bown; Peter Frampton ‡	Non-album single	1968	
"Have You Seen Your Brother Lately"	Anders Henriksson; Göran Lagerberg	Studio	1967	
"Hear My Lamentation"	Anders Henriksson; Göran Lagerberg	Contrast	1967	
"Hitch Hike" †	Marvin Gaye; Clarence Paul; William Stevenson ‡	Non-album single	1966	
"Hound Dog" †	Jerry Leiber; Mike Stoller ‡	Non-album single	1965	
"House Of Soul Hill"	Ray Eddlemon; Scott Turner ‡	Contrast	1967	
"How Can I Pray When I Don't Believe (The Elephant)" †	Göran Lagerberg; Adrian Moar	Non-album single	1970	
"Howlin' For My Baby"	Willie Dixon ‡	Extra Extra	1966	
"I Cry" †	Göran Lagerberg; Danne Larsson	Non-album single	1965	
"I Got My Mojo Working" †	Preston Foster ‡	Tages	1965	
"I Got You (I Feel Good)"	James Brown ‡	Tages 2	1966	
"I Left My Shoes At Home"	Tommy Blom; Danne Larsson	Studio	1967	
"I Pick Up The Bus"	Anders Henriksson; Göran Lagerberg; Adrian Moar	The Lilac Years	1969	
"I Read You Like An Open Book" †	Anders Henriksson; Göran Lagerberg; Adrian Moar	Non-album single	1968	
"I Should Be Glad" †	Göran Lagerberg; Danne Larsson	Non-album single	1965	
"I Still Remember"	Tommy Blom; Göran Lagerberg; Danne Larsson; Freddie Skantze; Anders Töpel	Tages 2	1966	
"I Wake Up And Call" †	Anders Henriksson; Göran Lagerberg; Adrian Moar	The Lilac Years	1969	
"I'll Be Doggone" †	Warren Moore; Smokey Robinson; Marv Tarplin ‡	Non-album single	1966	
"I'll Go Crazy"	James Brown ‡	Tages	1965	
"I'm Going Out" †	Bob Crewe; Gary Knight ‡	Contrast	1967	
"I'm Mad" †	Cecil Bowen; Walter Rhodes ‡	Non-album single	1966	
"In My Dreams" †	Tommy Blom; Göran Lagerberg; Danne Larsson; Anders Töpel	Tages 2	1966	
"It's In A Dream"	Anders Henriksson; Göran Lagerberg	Studio	1967	
"It's My Life"	Anders Henriksson; Göran Lagerberg	Studio	1967	
"Jealous Girl"	Gordon Mills; Brian Weske ‡	Tages 2	1966	
"Leaving Here" †	Lamont Dozier; Brian Holland; Eddie Holland ‡	Tages 2	1966	
"Like a Woman" †	Anders Henriksson; Göran Lagerberg; Danne Larsson	Studio	1967	
"Look What You Get" †	Anders Henriksson; Thorstein Bergman ‡	Non-album single	1967	
"Lost Child" †	Björn Linder; Adrian Moar	Non-album single	1970	
"Miss Mac Baren" †	Tommy Blom; Göran Lagerberg; Danne Larsson; Tommy Tausis; Anders Töpel	Non-album single	1966	
"Mohair Sam" †	Dallas Frazier ‡	Extra Extra	1966	
"Mustang Sally"	Bonny Rice ‡	Extra Extra	1966	
"Naggin'"	Jimmy Anderson; Jerry West ‡	Tages	1965	
"One Day"	Göran Lagerberg; Danne Larsson	Contrast	1967	
"One Red, One Yellow, One Blue" †	Tommy Blom; Anders Töpel	Extra Extra	1966	
"People Without Faces"	Tommy Blom	Studio	1967	
"Prisoner 763"	Tommy Blom; Danne Larsson	Contrast	1967	
"Ride Your Pony"	Naomi Neville ‡	Extra Extra	1966	
"Sailing Across The Ocean"	Anders Henriksson; Göran Lagerberg; Adrian Moar	The Lilac Years	1969	
"Secret Room" †	Tommy Blom	Extra Extra	1966	
"Seeing With Love"	Tommy Blom; Göran Lagerberg; Danne Larsson; Lasse Svensson; Anders Töpel	Studio	1967	
"Seventh Son"	Willie Dixon ‡	Tages	1965	
"She Is A Man"	Anders Henriksson; Bengt Palmers ‡ (Note: On "She Is A Man", Henriksson and Palmers are credited under their pseudonyms F. Akon and F. Zome, respectively.)	Studio	1967	
"She's Having a Baby Now" †	Tommy Blom; Göran Lagerberg; Danne Larsson; Lasse Svensson; Anders Töpel	Studio	1967	
"Short Song (Steps)"	Tommy Blom	Contrast	1967	
"Sister's Got A Boyfriend" †	Isaac Hayes; Allen Jones; David Porter ‡	Contrast	1967	
"Six White Horses" †	Anders Henriksson; Göran Lagerberg; Adrian Moar	The Lilac Years	1969	
"Sleep Little Girl" †	Tommy Blom	Non-album single	1964	
"So Many Girls" †	Göran Lagerberg	Non-album single	1966	
"Stand by Me"	Ben E. King; Jerry Leiber; Mike Stoller ‡	Tages	1965	
"Sun In Her Hand"	Anders Henriksson; Göran Lagerberg; Kathe Green	The Lilac Years	1969	
"Tell Me You're Mine" †	Göran Lagerberg; Anders Töpel	Non-album single	1964	
"The Girl I Once Had" †	Kathe Green; Danne Larsson; Adrian Moar	The Lilac Years	1969	
"The Lilac Years (De Sålde Sina Hemman)" †	lyrics by. Kathe Green arr. Anders Henriksson ‡	The Lilac Years	1969	
"The Old Man Wafwer"	Tommy Blom; Anders Henriksson; Göran Lagerberg	Studio	1967	
"The One for You" †	Danne Larsson	Tages	1965	
"There's a Blind Man Playin' Fiddle in the Street" †	Göran Lagerberg	Non-album single	1968	
"There's a Man Standing in the Corner"	Anders Henriksson; Göran Lagerberg; Kathe Green	The Lilac Years	1969	
"Those Rumours" †	Tommy Blom; Göran Lagerberg; Danne Larsson; Freddie Skantze; Anders Töpel	Tages 2	1966	
"Time Is Mine"	Anders Henriksson; Göran Lagerberg; Adrian Moar	The Lilac Years	1969	
"To Be Free" †	Göran Lagerberg; Björn Töpel	Non-album single	1968	
"Treat Her Like a Lady" †	Bob Crewe; Gary Knight ‡	Non-album single	1967	
"True Fine Woman" †	Göran Lagerberg	Extra Extra	1966	
"Understanding" †	Ronnie Lane; Steve Marriott ‡	Extra Extra	1966	
"Wanting"	Pete Antell ‡	Contrast	1967	
"What's The Time"	Tommy Blom; Danne Larsson	Studio	1967	
"Whatcha Gonna Do About It" †	Brian Potter; Ian Samwell ‡	Non-album single	1965	
"Why Do You Hide It"	Tommy Blom; Danne Larsson	Contrast	1967	
"You're Too Incomprehensible"	Anders Henriksson; Thorstein Bergman ‡	Contrast	1967	

== Other songs ==
Key
‡	Indicates songs not written or co-written by the members of Tages

Name of song, writer(s), original release, and year of release
Song	Writer(s)	Original release	Year	Ref.
America	Paul Simon ‡	Live 1965-1998, vol. 2	1998	
"Cadillac"	Vince Taylor ‡	Live 1965-1998, vol. 2	1998	
"Down by the Riverside"	arr. Tommy Blom; Göran Lagerberg; Danne Larsson; Lasse Svensson; Anders Töpel	Non-album single	1967	
"Hey Grandma"	Jerry Miller; Don Stevenson ‡	In My Dreams (compilation)	1994	
"Hey Jude"	John Lennon; Paul McCartney ‡	Live At Rondo / Every Raindrop Special	1998	
"Hey Mama"	Göran Lagerberg; Anders Töpel	Flexi disc advertisement	1965	
"Hi, Hi, Hi"	Paul McCartney; Linda McCartney ‡	Live 1965-1998, vol. 1	1998	
"I See The Rain"	Junior Campbell; Dean Ford ‡	Stora Popboxen (Svensk Pop 1964-1969 Volume 1)	2013	
"It's All Over Now"	Bobby Womack; Shirley Womack ‡	Live At Rondo / Every Raindrop Special	1998	
"Land of a Thousand Dances"	Chris Kenner ‡	Live 1965-1998, vol. 1	1998	
"Long Tall Shorty"	Don Covay ‡	Expressens Drömband	1966	
"Love Loves To Love"	Estell Levitt; Don Thomas ‡	Live 1965-1998, vol. 3	1999	
"Most Likely You Go Your Way and I'll Go Mine"	Bob Dylan ‡	Live 1965-1998, vol. 1	1999	
"My Days Are Numbered"	Al Cooper ‡	The Lilac Years (re-issue)	2003 (Note: Recorded in December 1969 as Blond.)	
"My Home Town"	Tommy Blom; Anders Töpel	Popligan – För FN Och Flykting-67	1967	
"Route 66"	Bobby Troup ‡	Nalen 1999	1999	
"Sticks and Stones"	Titus Turner ‡	Live at Last	1993	
"The Man You'll Be Looking For"	Göran Lagerberg	Flexi disc	1966	
"The Weight"	Robbie Robertson ‡	The Lilac Years (re-issue)	2003 (Note: Recorded in December 1969 as Blond.)	
"Tutti Frutti"	Dorothy LaBostrie; Little Richard ‡	In My Dreams (compilation)	1994	

== See also ==
- Tages discography
