= List of Tages members =

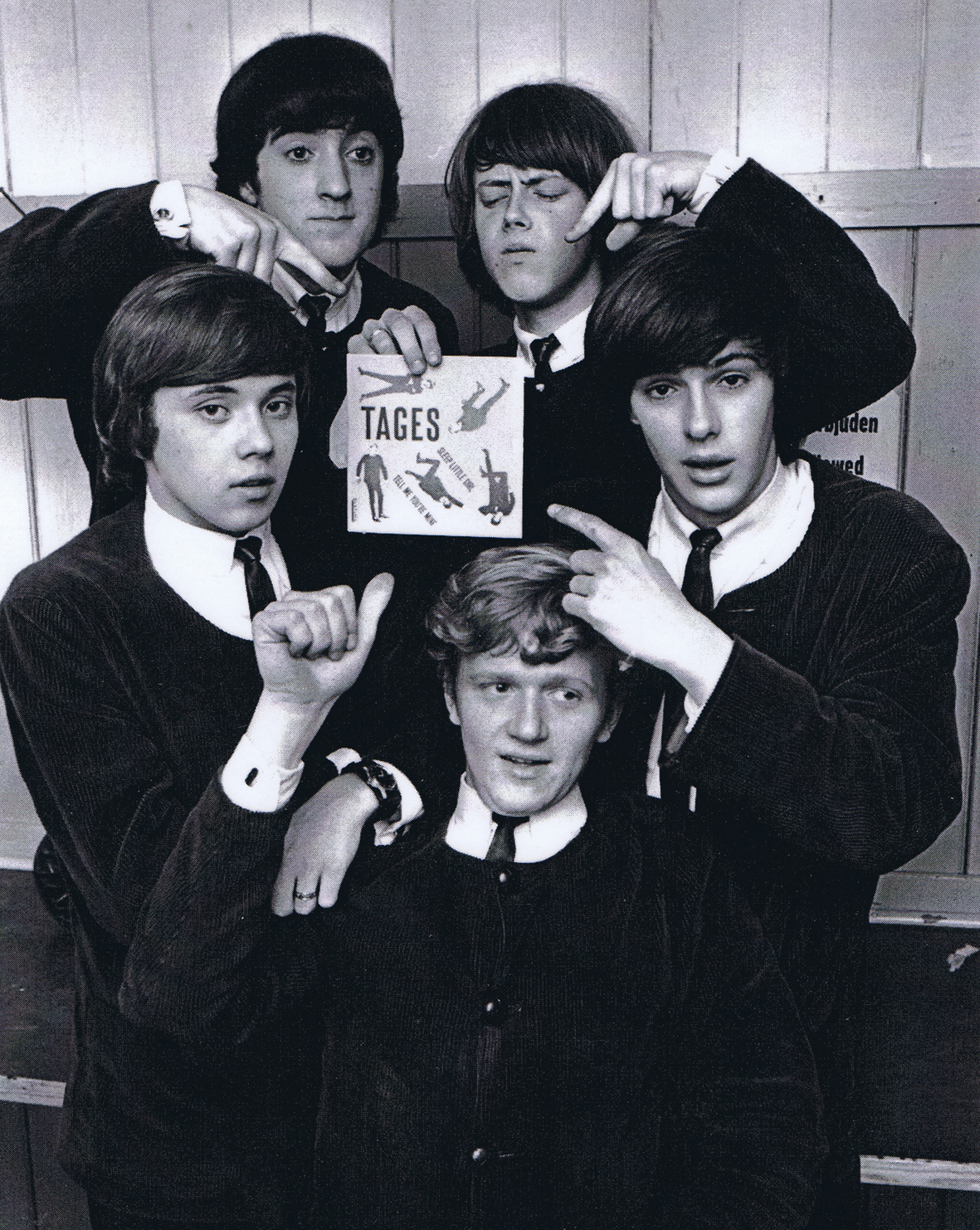
Tages in 1964 (clockwise) Lagerberg, Blom, Töpel, Larsson and Skantze

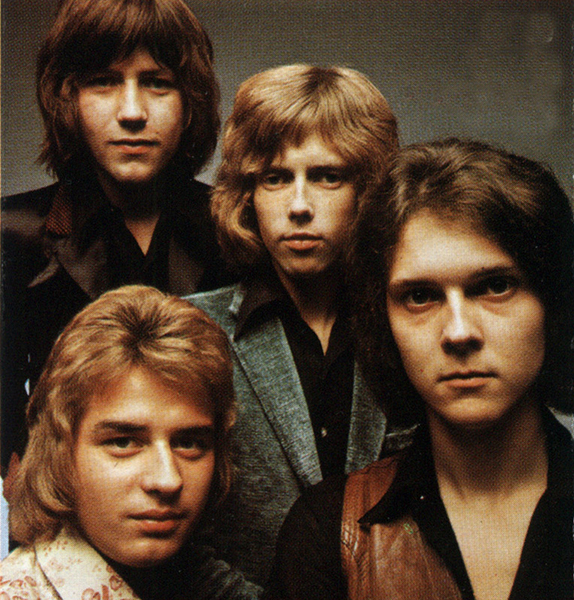
Blond in 1969 (clockwise) Linder, Lagerberg, Nordh and Svensson

Tages were a Swedish rock band formed in 1963, initially as a skiffle group. Their line-up during their breakthrough in 1964 consisted of Tommy Blom, Göran Lagerberg, Danne Larsson, Anders Töpel and Freddie Skantze. When they split up in 1970 during the name Blond, they consisted of Lagerberg, Lasse Svensson, Björn Linder, Björn Töpel and Mats Landahl.

== History ==
Tages originally formed as a duo between childhood friends Tommy Blom and Anders Töpel, who would get together and play guitar to positive reactions from acquaintances. Guitarist Danne Larsson was soon recruited on banjo that summer before Larsson himself only a few weeks later in turn recommended Göran Lagerberg to join the band. Influenced by the Beatles, they set out to play beat music. In doing so, they recruited drummer Freddie Skantze who debuted on stage with the group on 23 December 1963. Being a few years older than the group, he acted as their official kapellmeister in formal situations.

This was the lineup that played on the group's breakthrough single "Sleep Little Girl" in 1964, and would last until the early summer of 1966, when Skantze decided to quit the band that June. His successor, Tommy Tausis, was initiated on 16 July 1966 during an episode of Popside where he and Skantze trade places during the song "In My Dreams". Tausis stayed in group very briefly, playing and singing only on three releases by the band between August and November of that year. In January 1967 he was invited to join the Spotnicks to replace Jimmie Nicol, which he promptly accepted. Lasse Svensson from the Hi-Balls was urgently called and accepted a role in the band; he stayed with them until they broke up in 1970.

The line-up of Blom, Lagerberg, Larsson, Töpel and Svensson stayed together until 31 August 1968, when Blom decided to leave the group for personal reasons. The remaining quartet continued performing under the name Tages for the remainder of that year. In May 1969, they changed their name to Blond and recorded the album The Lilac Years before Larsson and Töpel left the band during that summer due to the mandatory conscription Sweden had at the time. Lagerberg instead recruited Björn Lindér on lead guitar, along with Anders Nordh who had already contributed to the recording sessions of The Lilac Years. This line-up had the time for a formal photo session, though lasted less than half a year and split around the time that the album reached the markets.

After taking a brief hiatus from the band for a month, Nordh decided to leave as he felt that the chemistry between him and the other members didn't work. Lagerberg, Lindér and Svensson then recruited Anders Töpel's brother Björn as a rhythm guitarist and Mats Landahl on keyboards and harmonica, debuting this line-up in December 1969. This line-up would record only one single, "Lost Child" (1970) before embarking on a tour of West Germany. However, this tour proved unsuccessful, prompting the band to split up in July 1970, officially ending their career with a televised performance on Sveriges Television's channel TV 1.

== Members ==
Image	Name	Years active	Instruments	Release contributions
	Göran Lagerberg	1963–1970	lead and backing vocals; bass guitar	all Tages / Blond releases
	Tommy Blom	1963–1968 (died 2014)	lead and backing vocals; harmonica; rhythm guitar; percussion	all Tages releases from "Sleep Little Girl" (1964) to "I Read You Like An Open Book" (1968)
	Danne Larsson	1963–1969	backing and lead vocals; rhythm guitar; keyboards; lead guitar	all Tages / Blond releases from "Sleep Little Girl" (1964) to The Lilac Years (1969)
	Anders Töpel	1963–1969 (died 2014)	backing and lead vocals; lead guitar; rhythm guitar	all Tages / Blond releases from "Sleep Little Girl" (1964) to The Lilac Years (1969)
	Freddie Skantze	1963–1966	drums; percussion	all Tages releases from "Sleep Little Girl" (1964) to Tages 2 (1966)
	Tommy Tausis	1966–1967 (died 2022)	lead and backing vocals; drums; percussion	Tages 2 (1966); "Miss Mac Baren (1966); Extra Extra (1966)
	Lasse Svensson	1967–1970	drums; percussion	all Tages / Blond releases from "Every Raindrop Means Alot" (1970) to "Lost Child" (1970)
	Björn Linder	1969–1970	lead guitar; backing vocals	"Balladen om killen" (1969); "Lost Child" (1970)
	Anders Nordh	1969	rhythm guitar; backing vocals	Uncredited guitar overdubs on The Lilac Years (1969)
	Björn Töpel	1969–1970	rhythm guitar; backing vocals	"Lost Child" (1970)
	Mats Landahl	1969–1970	keyboards; harmonica; backing vocals	"Lost Child" (1970)

== Lineups ==
Lineup	Members	Contributions
May – June 1963	Tommy Blom – guitar, vocals; Anders Töpel – guitar, vocals	None
June – July 1963	Tommy Blom – guitar, vocals; Anders Töpel – guitar, vocals; Danne Larsson – banjo, vocals	None
July – 23 December 1963	Tommy Blom – guitar, vocals; Anders Töpel – guitar, vocals; Danne Larsson – banjo, vocals; Göran Lagerberg – washboard, vocals	None
23 December 1963 – 16 July 1966	Tommy Blom – vocals, rhythm guitar, harmonica; Anders Töpel – lead guitar, rhythm guitar, vocals; Danne Larsson – rhythm guitar, keyboards, vocals; Göran Lagerberg – vocals, bass guitar; Freddie Skantze – drums, percussion	All releases from "Sleep Little Girl" (1964) to Tages 2 (1966)
16 July 1966 – January 1967	Tommy Blom – vocals, rhythm guitar; Anders Töpel – lead guitar, rhythm guitar vocals; Danne Larsson – rhythm guitar, keyboards, vocals; Göran Lagerberg – vocals, bass guitar; Tommy Tausis – vocals, drums, percussion	Tages 2 (1966); "Miss Mac Baren" (1966); Extra Extra (1966)
January 1967 – 31 August 1968	Tommy Blom – vocals, rhythm guitar; Anders Töpel – lead guitar, rhythm guitar; Danne Larsson – rhythm guitar, keyboards, vocals; Göran Lagerberg – vocals, bass guitar; Lasse Svensson – drums, percussion	All releases from "Every Raindrop Means Alot" (1967) to "I Read You Like An Open Book" (1968)
31 August 1968 – July 1969	Anders Töpel – lead guitar, rhythm guitar, vocals; Danne Larsson – rhythm guitar, keyboards, vocals; Göran Lagerberg – vocals, bass guitar; Lasse Svensson – drums, percussion	The Lilac Years (1969)
July – August 1969	Göran Lagerberg – vocals, bass guitar; Lasse Svensson – drums, percussion; Björn Linder – lead guitar, keyboards vocals	"Balladen om killen" (1969)
September – November 1969	Göran Lagerberg – vocals, bass guitar; Lasse Svensson – drums, percussion; Björn Linder – lead guitar, vocals; Anders Nordh – rhythm guitar, vocals	None
Hiatus November – December 1969
December 1969 – 29 July 1970	Göran Lagerberg – vocals, bass guitar; Lasse Svensson – drums, percussion; Björn Linder – lead guitar, vocals; Björn Töpel – rhythm guitar, vocals; Mats Landahl – keyboards, harmonica, vocals	"Lost Child" (1970)

== Sources ==
- Brandels, Göran; Wrigholm, Lennart (2012). Boken om Tages: från Avenyn till Abbey Road. Premium Publishing. ISBN 978-91-89136-88-5.
- Wrigholm, Lennart (1991). "Tages: Makalös grej i Götet…". Now & then (in Swedish).
