= Dancing in the Street =

1964 single by Martha and the Vandellas

Single by Martha and the Vandellas

from the album Dance Party
- B-side: "There He Is"
- Released: July 31, 1964
- Recorded: June 19, 1964
- Studio: Hitsville U.S.A., Detroit
- Genre: R&B
- Length: 2:40
- Label: Gordy
- Songwriters: Marvin Gaye; William "Mickey" Stevenson; Ivy Jo Hunter
- Producer: William "Mickey" Stevenson

Martha and the Vandellas singles chronology
"In My Lonely Room" (1964)	"Dancing in the Street" (1964)	"Wild One" (1964)

"Dancing in the Street" is a song written by Marvin Gaye, William Stevenson, and Ivy Jo Hunter for Martha and the Vandellas in 1964, whose version reached No. 2 on the Billboard Hot 100 chart for two weeks, behind "Do Wah Diddy Diddy" by Manfred Mann. It also peaked at No. 4 on the UK Singles Chart following a rerelease in 1969. It is one of Motown's signature songs and is the group's premier signature song.

A 1966 cover by the Mamas & the Papas was a minor hit on the Hot 100, reaching No. 73. In 1982, the rock group Van Halen took their cover of "Dancing in the Street" to No. 38 on the Hot 100 chart and No. 15 in Canada on the RPM chart. A 1985 duet cover by David Bowie and Mick Jagger charted at No. 1 in the UK and reached No. 7 in the US. The song has been covered by many other artists, including the Kinks, the Mamas & the Papas, Tages, Grateful Dead and Van Halen.

== Background ==
Reeves recounted that she initially regarded the song as too repetitive. Gaye and Stevenson agreed and including new Motown songwriter Ivy Jo Hunter added in musical composition. Martha Reeves remembered Marvin Gaye recorded the song first and sang it as though singing to a lover. Reeves, envisioning block parties and Mardi Gras, asked the producers to let her sing it her way. The song was recorded in two takes. The song's writers made sure to include Detroit as one of the cities mentioned with the lyric: "Can't forget the Motor City".

== Civil rights anthem ==
"Motown records had a distinct role to play in the city's black community, and that community—as diverse as it was—articulated and promoted its own social, cultural, and political agendas. These local agendas, which reflected the unique concerns of African Americans living in the urban north, both responded to and reconfigured the national civil rights campaign" (Smith 227). The movement lent the song its secondary meaning and the song with its second meaning fanned the flames of unrest. This song (and others like it) and its associated political meanings did not exist in a vacuum. It was a partner with its social environment and they both played upon each other, creating meaning that could not have been brought on by one or the other alone. The song therefore became a call to reject peace for the chance that unified unrest could bring about the freedom that suppressed minorities all across the United States so craved.

Cities in which there is dancing in the street (Martha Reeves version)

== Reception ==
"Dancing in the Street" peaked at No. 2 on the US Billboard Hot 100 chart when it was originally released as the group's third album Dance Party's first single in 1964 (see 1964 in music), with "There He Is (At My Door)" included as a B-side. "Dancing in the Street" also reached the Top 5 on the UK Singles Chart peaking at No. 4 in a 1969 release after initially peaking at No. 28 on the chart and helped to revive the Vandellas' success in the UK. Cash Box described it as "an infectious romp that drops names of various locales as it declares that dancing is sweeping the country", stating that it is "one of those sure-fire sock-rock productions."

Martha and the Vandellas' version of "Dancing in the Street" was inducted into the Grammy Hall of Fame in 1999. In 2006, this version was inducted into the National Recording Registry by the Library of Congress. Lead singer Martha Reeves said she was thrilled about the song's perseverance, saying "It's a song that just makes you want to get up and dance".

Billboard named the song No. 29 on their list of 100 Greatest Girl Group Songs of All Time.

"Street Fighting Man", a 1968 song from the Rolling Stones, slightly modifies a signature line from "Dancing in the Street" to be: "Summer's here and the time is right for fighting in the street."

In 2026, the song was included in Esquire's list of the "25 Most American Songs of All Time", with journalist Alan Light writing that the song "reminds us that in this country, strong Black voices are inherently and powerfully political."

== Personnel ==
- Martha Reeves – lead vocals
- Betty Kelly, Rosalind Ashford, William "Mickey" Stevenson, and Ivy Jo Hunter – backing vocals
- The Funk Brothers – instrumentation
  - Robert White – guitar
  - Eddie Willis – guitar
  - Joe Messina – guitar
  - James Jamerson – bass guitar
  - Marvin Gaye – drums
  - Jack Ashford – percussion, tambourine, vibes
  - Ivy Jo Hunter – percussion (tire iron)
  - Henry Cosby – tenor saxophone
  - Thomas "Beans" Bowles – baritone saxophone
  - Russ Conway – trumpet
  - Herbert Williams – trumpet
  - Paul Riser – trombone
  - George Bohanon – trombone

== Chart performance ==
=== Weekly charts ===
Chart (1964)	Peak position
Australia (Kent Music Report)	71
Canada Top Singles (RPM)	3
New Zealand (Lever Hit Parade)	3
UK Singles (Official Charts)	28
US Billboard Hot 100	2
US Cash Box R&B Singles	8
US Cash Box Top 100	4
Chart (1969)	Peak position
Germany (GfK)	36
Ireland (IRMA)	12
Netherlands (Dutch Top 40)	45
UK Singles (Official Charts)	4

=== Year-end charts ===
Chart (1964)	Rank
US Billboard Hot 100	17
US Cash Box Top 100	64
Chart (1969)	Rank
UK Singles (OCC)	62

== Certifications ==
Region	Certification	Certified units/sales
New Zealand (RMNZ)	Gold	15,000^{‡}
United Kingdom (BPI) Sales since 14 November 2004	Platinum	600,000^{‡}
United States (RIAA)	Gold	500,000^{^}
^{^} Shipments figures based on certification alone.^{‡} Sales+streaming figures based on certification alone.

== The Kinks version ==
"Dancing in the Street"

Song by the Kinks

from the album Kinda Kinks
- Released: March 5, 1965
- Recorded: February 15–17, 1965
- Studio: Pye, London
- Genre: Rhythm and blues
- Length: 2:59
- Label: Pye
- Songwriters: Marvin Gaye; William "Mickey" Stevenson; Ivy Jo Hunter
- Producer: Shel Talmy

British rock band the Kinks recorded "Dancing in the Street" for their second studio album Kinda Kinks in 1965. It was one of only two cover songs on the album, and was recorded on February 15–17, 1965 at Pye Studios Number 2 in London, United Kingdom. The song was rush-recorded, along with most of Kinda Kinks in order to get a quicker release date. The album was released on March 5, 1965 and reached number 3 in the UK, and number 60 in the US.

Nonetheless, "Dancing in the Street" was panned by critics for being too boring. In his book Ready For a Brand New Beat: How 'Dancing In The Street' Became the Anthem for a Changing America, Mark Kurlansky states that the song contained no particular interpretation or a distinct rhythmic groove. Thomas M. Kitts states it as weak in his biography about Ray Davies, and Johnny Rogan calls it colorless in his book, Ray Davies: A Complicated Life. Ultimate Classic Rock considered the track a "barely awake cover of the Motown standard".

=== Personnel ===
The Kinks

- Ray Davies – lead vocals, rhythm guitar
- Dave Davies – lead guitar, backing vocals
- Pete Quaife – bass guitar, backing vocals
- Mick Avory – drums

Other personnel

- Rasa Davies – backing vocals

== The Mamas & the Papas version ==
"Dancing in the Street"

Single by the Mamas & the Papas

from the album The Mamas & the Papas
- A-side: "Words of Love"
- Released: November 14, 1966
- Recorded: 1966
- Genre: Sunshine pop; folk rock
- Length: 2:59
- Label: Dunhill
- Songwriters: Marvin Gaye; William "Mickey" Stevenson; Ivy Jo Hunter
- Producer: Lou Adler

The Mamas & the Papas singles chronology
"Look Through My Window" (1966)	"Dancing in the Street" (1966)	"Dedicated to the One I Love" (1967)

=== Background ===
In 1966, the folk rock group the Mamas & the Papas recorded a cover version of "Dancing in the Street", which was taken from their self-titled second studio album. Cass Elliot sang the lead vocal, while the other members did their harmonies in the background. This version featured an instrumental section. The song's ending is humorous, which featured Elliot and Papa Denny Doherty having a dialogue listing the cities in both the United States, as well as Halifax, Nova Scotia, Canada, where Doherty was from, before the song's fade. At the Monterey Pop Festival in 1967, the Mamas and the Papas ended their set with "Dancing in the Street", before Elliot told the audience at the festival: "You're on your own, babies, 'cause we're sure on ours." This was the last time that the group performed live in concert.

"Dancing in the Street" was produced by Lou Adler and issued as the B-side of the single "Words of Love" on the Dunhill Records label. It reached No. 73 on the Billboard Hot 100 chart. Cash Box said it was "a powerful reading of the Motown sound with Cass Elliot singing a powerful lead."

"Words of Love" reached number 3 in Canada.

In 1969, Elliot performed the song on her television special, The Mama Cass Television Program.

=== Personnel ===
The Mamas and the Papas

- Cass Elliot – lead vocals
- Denny Doherty – harmony and backing vocals
- Michelle Phillips – harmony and backing vocals
- John Phillips – guitar, harmony and backing vocals

Other personnel

- Hal Blaine – drums, tambourine
- Joe Osborn – bass guitar
- Larry Knechtel – electric piano
- "Doctor" Eric Hord – guitar
- Lou Adler – producer

=== Charts ===
Chart (1966–1967)	Peak position
Australia (Kent Music Report)	6
U.S. Billboard Hot 100	73
U.S. Cash Box Top 100	86

== Tages version ==
"Dancing in the Street"

Single by Tages

from the album Tages 2
- B-side: "Those Rumours"
- Released: October 31, 1967
- Recorded: May–June 1966
- Studio: Europafilm Studios Studios, Stockholm
- Genre: Rhythm and blues; pop
- Length: 2:32
- Label: Platina
- Songwriters: Marvin Gaye; Ivy Jo Hunter; William "Mickey" Stevenson
- Producer: Anders Henriksson

Tages singles chronology
"Treat Her Like A Lady" (1967)	"Dancing in the Street" (1967)	"Mohair Sam" (1967)

=== Background ===
Swedish rock group Tages incorporated "Dancing in the Street" into their setlist during either December 1965 or January 1966. This rendition was performed with original drummer Freddie Skantze, who did not sing lead vocals on the performances. Tages rendition of the song removes the brass parts for optimization during live performances, instead incorporating them into licks by lead guitarist Anders Töpel or organ parts played by rhythm guitarist Danne Larsson, who started learning the instrument in mid-1965. Following the success of their rendition of Marvin Gaye's "I'll Be Doggone", which reached number 10 on Kvällstoppen and number 7 on Tio i Topp in late May-early June 1966, Tages decided to record "Dancing in the Street" for their upcoming album Tages 2.

However, prior to recording the song, Skantze had left the band. He was swiftly replaced by Tommy Tausis, whose drumming talents and vocal skills fit the band perfectly. With Tausis now in the band, bassist Göran Lagerberg had started harmonizing with him on various songs, further minimizing Tommy Blom's role as lead singer in the band. The band had now also finalized the arrangement of "Dancing in the Street", with Lagerberg and Tausis sharing lead vocals on the track, with Larsson playing both the electric organ and piano to compensate for the lack of brass instruments. During sporadic sessions at Europafilm Studios, Bromma between May and June 1966, The group recorded "Dancing in the Street".

=== Release ===
"Dancing in the Street" was first released by Platina Records on August 4, 1966 when it was included as the opening track on Tages 2, the group's second studio album. It was one of three rhythm and blues covers on the album, along with "I Got You (I Feel Good)" and "Leaving Here". The album sold over 10000 copies in Sweden alone, becoming their second and final album to be certified gold. The liner notes of the album states that "Dancing in the Street" is "the compact rhythmic opening with a new singing pair consisting of Göran Lagerberg and Tommy Tausis." The group would go on to record another album for Platina, Extra Extra before their contract expired, enabling them to sign with Parlophone Records instead. It was also at around this time that Tausis left the band to join the Spotnicks. He was replaced by Lasse Svensson.

After signing with Parlophone, Platina decided to issue several songs from Extra Extra as singles in order to capitalize on their success, starting with "Secret Room" in 1967. Following several singles from Extra Extra, Platina managed to extract "Dancing in the Street" for single release, almost one and a half years after it was recorded. It was the third single from Tages 2, following "In My Dreams" and "Crazy 'Bout My Baby", but was the only single from that album released in 1967. The B-side was "Those Rumours", a song which was written by the band and also appeared on Tages 2. Due to the lack of advertising regarding the single, and the release of the contemporary single "Treat Her Like A Lady", which reached number 7 on Kvällstoppen and 3 on Tio i Topp, "Dancing in the Street" failed to chart on Kvällstoppen, but entered Tio i Topp on December 9, 1967 for a week before being voted off.

The Swedish single sleeve is a photograph, which is an alternate take of the one which previously appeared on "Miss Mac Baren" in November 1966. Curiously, the Norwegian single sleeve shows Freddie Skantze, who did not participate in the recording. Tages performed the song on an episode of Swedish pop show Popsan on October 7, 1966.

=== Personnel ===
Tages

- Göran Lagerberg – co-lead vocals, bass guitar
- Tommy Tausis – co-lead vocals, drums
- Tommy Blom – percussion, backing vocals
- Anders Töpel – lead guitar, backing vocals
- Danne Larsson – organ, piano, backing vocals

Other personnel

- Anders "Henkan" Henriksson – studio engineer
- Björn Almstedt – studio engineer

=== Charts ===
Chart (1967)	Peak position
Sweden (Tio i Topp)	15

== Grateful Dead version ==
"Dancing in the Streets"

Single by Grateful Dead

from the album Terrapin Station
- B-side: "Terrapin Station"
- Released: October 1977
- Recorded: 1977
- Genre: Rock and roll, dance-rock, psychedelic
- Length: 3:16
- Label: Arista
- Songwriters: Marvin Gaye; Ivy Hunter; William Stevenson
- Producer: Keith Olsen

Grateful Dead singles chronology
"Franklin's Tower" (1975)	"Dancing in the Streets" (1977)	"Passenger" (1977)

The rock band Grateful Dead began performing "Dancing in the Street" live in 1966, and through 1971 played the song about 40 times, with Bob Weir singing lead before the song was shelved for several years. The song returned to their rotation in 1976, and was played about 80 more times before being retired in 1987. Live recordings from both periods have been released. In that second period, the group recorded a cover version of the song in the studio, and released it as a single taken from their 1977 album Terrapin Station. This version is credited to Stevenson, Gaye, and Hunter, but is titled "Dancin' in the Streets" rather than "Dancing in the Street".

Bassist Phil Lesh has described "Dancing in the Street" as the first song the band stretched out in the live setting from a short pop song into drawn out improvisational jam piece, a practice that would become a Grateful Dead signature.

=== Personnel ===
Grateful Dead

- Bob Weir – co-lead vocals, rhythm guitar
- Jerry Garcia – lead guitar
- Donna Godchaux – co-lead vocals
- Keith Godchaux – keyboards, backing vocals
- Phil Lesh – bass guitar
- Mickey Hart – drums
- Bill Kreutzmann-drums

Additional personnel

- The Martyn Ford Orchestra – brass instruments
- Rick Collins – mastering
- Greg Fulginiti – mastering
- Keith Olsen – production, engineering

== Van Halen version ==
"Dancing in the Street"

Single by Van Halen

from the album Diver Down
- B-side: "The Full Bug" "Where Have All the Good Times Gone" (Germany)
- Released: May 1982
- Recorded: 1982
- Studio: Sunset Sound Recorders, Hollywood
- Genre: Hard rock; dance-rock
- Length: 3:43
- Label: Warner Bros.
- Songwriters: Marvin Gaye; William "Mickey" Stevenson; Ivy Jo Hunter
- Producer: Ted Templeman

Van Halen singles chronology
"(Oh) Pretty Woman" (1982)	"Dancing in the Street" (1982)	"Secrets" (1982)

Van Halen released "Dancing in the Street" as the second single from their 1982 studio album Diver Down. Their version attracted decent commercial success, reaching the top 40 on the US Billboard Hot 100 chart and becoming a top 15 hit on the Canadian Singles Chart. This version is described by the author Chris O'Leary as "pop-metal disco".

=== Track listing ===
==== 7" single (U.S.) ====
1. "Dancing in the Street" – 3:43
2. "The Full Bug" – 3:18

==== 7" single (Germany) ====
1. "Dancing in the Street" – 3:43
2. "Where Have All the Good Times Gone" – 3:02

=== Personnel ===
- David Lee Roth – lead vocals
- Eddie Van Halen – guitar, synthesizer, backing vocals
- Michael Anthony – bass, backing vocals
- Alex Van Halen – drums

=== Chart performance ===
Chart (1982–1983)	Peak position
Canadian Singles Chart	15
U.S. Billboard Hot 100	38
U.S. Billboard Mainstream Rock Tracks	3

== David Bowie and Mick Jagger version ==
"Dancing in the Street"

Single by David Bowie and Mick Jagger
- Released: August 27, 1985
- Recorded: June 29, 1985; Early July 1985 (overdubs)
- Studio: Abbey Road, London (Note: Other sources list the studio as Westside Studios in London.); Power Station, New York City
- Genre: Pop rock
- Length: 3:12
- Label: EMI America
- Songwriters: Marvin Gaye; William "Mickey" Stevenson; Ivy Jo Hunter
- Producers: Alan Winstanley; Clive Langer

David Bowie singles chronology
"Loving the Alien" (1985)	"Dancing in the Street" (1985)	"Absolute Beginners" (1986)

Mick Jagger singles chronology
"Lucky in Love" (1985)	"Dancing in the Street" (1985)	"Hard Woman" (1985)

Music video
- "Dancing in the Street" on YouTube

A cover version of "Dancing in the Street" was recorded by the English rock musicians Mick Jagger and David Bowie as a duo in 1985, to raise money for the Live Aid famine relief cause. The original plan was to perform a track together live, with Bowie performing at Wembley Stadium in London and Jagger at John F. Kennedy Stadium in Philadelphia, until it was realized that the satellite link-up would cause a half-second delay and neither musician wanted to mime to the track. The idea was scrapped in favour of a pre-recorded video to be played at Live Aid. "Dancing in the Street" was chosen after the first choice, a cover of Bob Marley's song "One Love/People Get Ready", was dropped.

The song was recorded at the end of a recording day on June 29, 1985. Bowie was recording his contributions to the Absolute Beginners soundtrack at London's Abbey Road Studios and used the same musicians and production team for "Dancing in the Street". Co-producer Alan Winstanley described the initial rehearsals as "fucking awful ... like a cabaret band". Jagger arrived an hour later, after which "the whole band picked up". Jagger and Bowie initially sang together into one microphone, but re-recorded their vocals separately after the sound was bleeding between mikes. The drummer Neil Conti recalled Jagger having an "ego trip" and strutting around the studio in an effort to "upstage Bowie". A rough mix of the track was completed in four hours, after which Bowie and Jagger departed to film the accompanying music video, which was completed by the next morning. In early July, Jagger arranged for some minor musical overdubs, including more vocals, percussion, horns, and guitar tracks by G. E. Smith and Earl Slick at the Power Station in New York City.

=== Release and reception ===
Following Live Aid, EMI America issued Bowie and Jagger's recording of "Dancing in the Street" as a single on August 27, 1985, (Note: Other sources list the date as August 12, 1985.) with all profits going to the Live Aid charity. The single version, later included on Bowie's Best of Bowie (2002) and Nothing Has Changed (2014) compilations, is longer than the video mix. Additional remixes appeared on the various single formats and were reissued as digital downloads in 2007. The song was also featured on the Jagger compilation The Very Best of Mick Jagger (2007).

The single topped the UK Singles Chart for four weeks, and reached No. 7 in the United States on the Billboard Hot 100, making it Bowie's seventh and penultimate top ten hit and Jagger's second after "State of Shock". It also topped the charts in Ireland, the Netherlands, Spain, Australia and Canada. Bowie and Jagger performed the song once more, at the Prince's Trust Concert on June 20, 1986. "Dancing in the Street" was the sixth best selling single of 1985, with 661,000 sold copies in the United Kingdom. The song was certified Gold by the British Phonographic Industry (BPI) in 1985. The single was reissued on white vinyl on August 29, 2025, to celebrate its 40th anniversary. The release includes all of the song's commercially released mixes. Thirty percent of the proceeds were donated to the Band Aid Charitable Trust.

In 1988, U.S. television network ABC used a sample of this song, to promote their 1988–1989 campaign, but under the name "Something's Happening", which is the second year they used the same name, the first time being for the 1987–1988 campaign.

In 2011, it was voted the eighth-best collaboration of all time in a Rolling Stone readers poll. In a survey conducted by PRS for Music, the song was voted as the top song the British public would play at street parties in celebration of the 2011 Royal Wedding of Kate Middleton and Prince William.

Cities, countries and continents in which there is dancing in the street (Bowie/Jagger version)

=== Music video ===
We had such a laugh doing "Dancing in the Street" with both the song recorded in the studio and the video done in one day. Remarkable how we pulled it off really. The video is hilarious to watch now. We enjoyed camping it up and trying to impersonate each other's moves, making it up as we went along. It was the only time David and myself collaborated on anything, which is a real shame.

— Mick Jagger, June 2025

The song's music video was filmed at Spillers Millennium Mills in London's Docklands with the director David Mallet. Mallet described the video as "literal" and its process as very spontaneous: "They're literally dancing in the streets. ... It's basically what you can do in five or six hours. I think [Bowie and Jagger] bought a suit for each other to wear but that was it. We literally made it up as we went along. I think it captured the chemistry between the two people."

The video was played twice during the Live Aid event: the first before Bowie's set, where it was introduced via satellite by the comedian Chevy Chase, and the second time as a filler when the Who's reunion set suffered sound problems. "Dancing in the Street" was re-edited and theatrically released by Music Motions. Introduced by Scott Muni, the clip was distributed to approximately 5,000 theaters, making it the widest release of any music video up to that point.

The video won Best Overall Performance in a Video at the 1986 MTV Video Music Awards. It has been described as "campy", "cheesy" and "embarrassing". Radio X's Martin O'Gorman remarked: "It's [Bowie and Jagger's] playful irreverence that causes many people to cringe." Readers of The Guardian rated it the worst music video of all time in 2014, while NME placed it at No. 12 in their list of the 50 worst music videos ever. In a 2011 episode of Family Guy, Peter Griffin refers to the video as "the gayest music video of all time", after which it is played in its entirety. After its conclusion, Griffin states: "That happened and we all let it happen." In the 2010s, a "silent" version of the video was uploaded to YouTube, featuring grunts and shuffles instead of the music. Bowie himself was a fan of the video, with guitarist Ben Monder saying: "He thought it was hilarious and would just have us watch the whole thing [during the Blackstar sessions]."

=== Track listings ===
==== 7": EMI America / EA 204 United Kingdom ====
1. "Dancing in the Street" (Clearmountain Mix) – 3:12
2. "Dancing in the Street" (instrumental) – 3:17

==== 12": EMI America / 12EA 204 United Kingdom ====
1. "Dancing in the Street" (Steve Thompson and Michael Barbiero Mix) – 4:40
2. "Dancing in the Street" (dub version) – 4:41
3. "Dancing in the Street" (edited version) – 3:24

=== Personnel ===
According to Chris O'Leary:

- David Bowie, Mick Jagger – lead vocal
- Kevin Armstrong, G. E. Smith, Earl Slick – guitar
- Steve Nieve – keyboards
- Matthew Seligman, John Regan – bass
- Neil Conti – drums
- Pedro Ortiz, Jimmy Maelen – percussion
- Mac Gollehon – trumpet
- Stan Harrison – alto and tenor saxophone
- Lenny Pickett – tenor and baritone saxophone
- Helena Springs, Tessa Niles – backing vocals

Technical

- Clive Langer, Alan Winstanley – producer
- Mark Saunders, Bob Clearmountain, Stephen Benben – engineer

=== Weekly charts ===
Chart (1985–1986)	Peak position
Australia (Kent Music Report)	1
Austria (Ö3 Austria Top 40)	6
Belgium (Ultratop 50 Flanders)	2
Canada (CHUM)	2
Canada Top Singles (RPM)	1
Europe (European Hot 100 Singles)	1
Finland (Suomen virallinen lista)	1
France (SNEP)	34
Germany (GfK)	6
Ireland (IRMA)	1
Israel (Israeli Singles Chart)	1
Italy (Musica e dischi)	3
Netherlands (Dutch Top 40)	1
Netherlands (Single Top 100)	1
New Zealand (Recorded Music NZ)	2
Norway (VG-lista)	3
South Africa (Springbok Radio)	10
Spain (AFYVE)	5
Spain (Los 40 Principales)	1
Sweden (Sverigetopplistan)	4
Switzerland (Schweizer Hitparade)	9
UK Singles (Official Charts)	1
US Billboard Hot 100	7
US Dance Club Songs (Billboard)	4
US Mainstream Rock Airplay (Billboard)	3
US Cash Box Top 100	8

=== Year-end charts ===
Chart (1985)	Rank
Australia (Kent Music Report)	11
Canada	26
Netherlands (Dutch Top 40)	12
Netherlands (Single Top 100)	17
New Zealand	13
UK Singles Chart	6
U.S. Cash Box	72

=== Certifications ===
Region	Certification	Certified units/sales
United Kingdom (BPI)	Gold	500,000^{^}
^{^} Shipments figures based on certification alone.
