= I'll Be Doggone =

1965 single by Marvin Gaye

Single by Marvin Gaye

from the album Moods of Marvin Gaye
- B-side: "Forever"
- Released: February 26, 1965
- Recorded: January 21, 23 & 29, 1965
- Studio: Hitsville, USA, Detroit
- Genre: Soul
- Length: 2:50
- Label: Tamla
- Songwriters: William "Smokey" Robinson; Warren Moore; Marvin Tarplin
- Producer: William "Smokey" Robinson

Marvin Gaye singles chronology
"How Sweet It Is (to Be Loved by You)" (1964)	"I'll Be Doggone" (1965)	"Pretty Little Baby" (1965)

"I'll Be Doggone" is a 1965 song recorded by the American soul singer Marvin Gaye and released on the Tamla label. The song talks about how a man tells his woman that he'll be "doggone" about simple things but if she did him wrong that he'd be "long gone". The song was written by Miracles members Smokey Robinson, Pete Moore and Marv Tarplin, initially for The Temptations, who rejected the song.

It became his first million-selling record and his first number-one single on the R&B chart, staying there for two weeks, and was the first song Gaye recorded with Smokey Robinson as one of the songwriters of the record. The song was co-written by Robinson's fellow Miracles members Pete Moore and Marv Tarplin. The Miracles also sang background on this recording, along with Motown's long-standing female back-up group, The Andantes, and Miracle Marv Tarplin played lead guitar. "I'll Be Doggone" gave Marvin his third top-ten pop hit, where it peaked at number eight on the Billboard Hot 100, with that number matched by his follow-up record, "Ain't That Peculiar". Billboard described "I'll Be Doggone" as a "powerful follow-up to 'How Sweet It Is,'" stating that "Gaye's wailing vocal performance is pitted against a driving dance beat backing." Cash Box described it as "a rhythmic, chorus-backed bluesy tearjerker with a contagious repeating riff." Record World said it is "up tempo and bright and bound to go far on charts."

The song has since been recorded by several other artists, including Paul Revere & the Raiders, Albert King and Solomon Burke. However, the most notable renditions of "I'll Be Doggone" were recorded by Swedish rock band Tages who managed to reach the Swedish top-10 with it in 1966 and Penny DeHaven who charted on the Billboard Country Chart with it in 1973.

== Personnel ==
- Lead vocals by Marvin Gaye
- Background vocals by The Miracles (Claudette Rogers Robinson, Pete Moore, Ronnie White, and Bobby Rogers) & The Andantes (Marlene Barrow, Jackie Hicks and Louvain Demps)
- Guitar by Marv Tarplin of The Miracles
- Other instrumentation by The Funk Brothers

== Chart performance ==
=== Weekly charts ===
Chart (1965)	Peak position
US Billboard Hot 100	8
US Hot Rhythm & Blues Singles	1
US Cashbox Top 100	10

=== Year-end charts ===
Chart (1965)	Rank
US Billboard	58
US Cash Box	78

== Tages version ==
"I'll Be Doggone"
- Swedish picture sleeve

Single by Tages
- B-side: "Hitch Hike"
- Released: May 12, 1966
- Recorded: May 5, 1966
- Studio: Europafilm, Stockholm
- Genre: Garage rock; R&B
- Length: 2:12
- Label: Platina
- Songwriters: Robinson; Moore; Tarplin
- Producer: Anders Henriksson

Tages singles chronology
"So Many Girls" (1966)	"I'll Be Doggone" (1966)	"In My Dreams" (1966)

The Swedish rock band Tages recorded "I'll Be Doggone" as their seventh single in 1966. The song had previously been in their setlist, and was their second cover song released as a single, after "Bloodhound" in November 1965. The band recorded the track on May 5, 1966, at Europafilm Studios in the suburbs of Stockholm, Sweden with Anders Henriksson producing the record. The B-Side "Hitch Hike" was recorded in the same session, that song being co-written by Marvin Gaye. "I'll Be Doggone" is notable because it was one of Tages first singles to feature bassist Göran Lagerberg on lead vocals, in contrast with regular vocalist Tommy Blom. It was the group's third-to-last rhythm and blues single (before "Dancing in the Street" and "Doctor Feel-Good", both in 1967 and 1968 respectively) and one of their last cover songs; almost all material after "I'll Be Doggone" are original compositions.

Platina Records released "I'll Be Doggone" on May 12, 1966, a week after it was recorded. Initial copies of the single had the title misprinted as "I'll Be Dog On", a mistake which was corrected the following day. However, multiple copies of the misprinted label managed to reach the market. "I'll Be Doggone" entered Kvällstoppen, the Swedish sales chart on June 7, 1966, at a position of number 15. The following week, it reached number 13. On June 21, 1966, it had reached its peak at number 10. The following week, it had once again ascended to number 13, before reaching number 17 the week after. "I'll Be Doggone" was last seen on the chart on July 7, 1966, at a position of number 17. In total, it spent 6 weeks on the chart, of which one was in the top-10. It fared better on the radio-chart Tio i Topp, where it stayed for 1 week, peaking at number 7. Although this was an apparent hit single, it was a commercial failure for the band, as all their previous singles (with the exception of "The One For You") had reached the top-5 on Kvällstoppen.

"I'll Be Doggone" did not appear on Tages 2 which was released only three months after single. The B-Side was not released on that album either. It got its first album release on the August 1967 compilation album The Best of Tages. "Hitch Hike" was first released on an album on May 28, 1968, when it was featured on the compilation album Forget Him. Both songs were later featured on the 1983 compilation album Tages – 1964–1968. and on Don't Turn Your Back, an album which compiles the Tages 1964–1966 recordings in 1994.

=== Personnel ===
- Göran Lagerberg – lead vocals, bass guitar
- Danne Larsson – rhythm guitar
- Anders Töpel – lead vocals
- Tommy Blom – tambourine, percussion
- Freddie Skantze – drums

=== Chart performance ===
Chart (1966)	Peak position
Sweden (Kvällstoppen)	10
Sweden (Tio i Topp)	7

== Cover versions ==
- Paul Revere & the Raiders covered the song in their 1966 studio album Just Like Us!.
- In 1973, Penny DeHaven released a Country version on a single only (Billboard country chart #67).
- Albert King covered the song on his 1972 album I'll Play the Blues for You.
- Twiggy covered it in her album Please Get My Name Right (1977).
- Bob Weir covered the song on his 1978 solo album Heaven Help the Fool. He also performed it live with his band frequently during that time.
- Solomon Burke covered the song on his 1969 album Proud Mary.

== See also ==
- List of number-one R&B singles of 1965 (U.S.)
