= Kebnekajse =

Swedish rock band

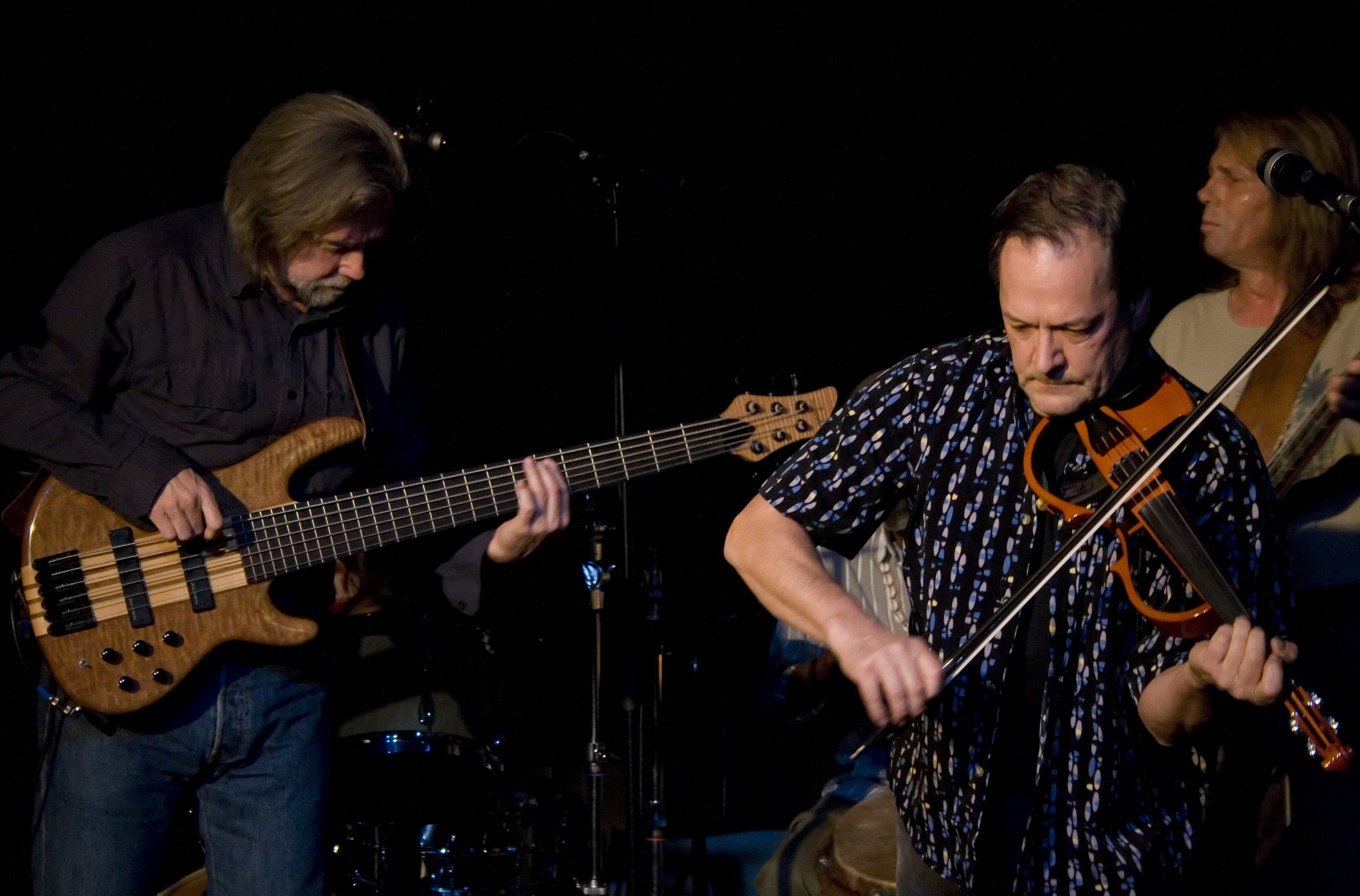
- Kebnekajse, (2009).

Background information
- Origin: Stockholm, Sweden
- Genres: Folk rock, hard rock, progressive rock, progressive folk, psychedelic folk, psychedelic rock, symphonic rock
- Years active: 1971–1978; 2001–present
- Labels: Silence, Subliminal
- Members: Kenny Håkansson; Pelle Ekman; Göran Lagerberg; Mats Glenngård; Hassan Bah; Thomas Netzler
- Past members: Bengt Linnarsson; Rolf Scherrer; Gunnar Andersson; Ingemar Böcker; Pelle Lindström; Turid Lundqvist; Åke Eriksson; Pelle Holm; Per Lejring
- Website: www.kebnekajse.se

Kebnekajse is a Swedish band that was most active during the 1970s after its members left the Mecki Mark Men. The band was greatly influenced by both traditional Swedish folk music and African music. The name is taken from Kebnekaise, the highest mountain in Sweden. The spelling of the band name was originally the correct spelling of the mountain, but for the last two albums (Kebnekajse and Idioten), it was changed it to the present spelling.

The band categorised itself as progressive rock but, at the time in Sweden, progressiveness was a political rather than a musical concept.

The band uses guitar, violin, congas, drums, bass and other instruments. Kebnekajse played a variety of styles starting from hard rock, but moved to folk music, symphonic rock and jazz fusion. With the 2009 album, the band returned to progressive folk.

== Members ==
Current members

- Kenny Håkansson – guitar, vocals (1971–1977, 2001–present)
- Pelle Ekman – drums, vocals (1971–1977, 2001–present)
- Hassan Bah – percussion, vocals (1972–1978, 2001–present)
- Mats Glenngård – electric violin, guitar, mandolin, vocals (1972–1978, 2001–present)
- Göran Lagerberg – bass, guitar, vocals (1972–1975, 2001–present)

Former members

- Rolf Scherrer – guitar (1971–1973)
- Bella Linnarsson – bass (1971–1972)
- Ingemar Böcker – guitar (1972–1975, 2001–2006)
- Pelle Lindström – guitar, harmonica (1972–1975, 2001–2004)
- Gunnar Andersson – drums (1972–1974)
- Pelle Holm – drums, vocals (1977–1978)
- Per Lejring – keyboard (1977–1978)
- Thomas Netzler – bass, drums, vocals (1972–1978, 2001–2023)

== Discography ==
- Resa mot okänt mål (1971) (Journey to an unknown destination)
- Kebnekajse II (1973)
- Kebnekajse III (1975)
- Ljus från Afrika (1976) (Lights from Africa)
- Elefanten (1976) (The elephant)
- Vi drar vidare (1978) (We press on)
- Electric Mountain (1993) – compilation album
- Resa mot okänt mål (2001) – remastered
- Kebnekajse (2009)
- Idioten (2011)
- Aventure (2012)
