= Magnus Lindberg (Swedish musician) =

Swedish musician, singer, and composer (1952–2019)

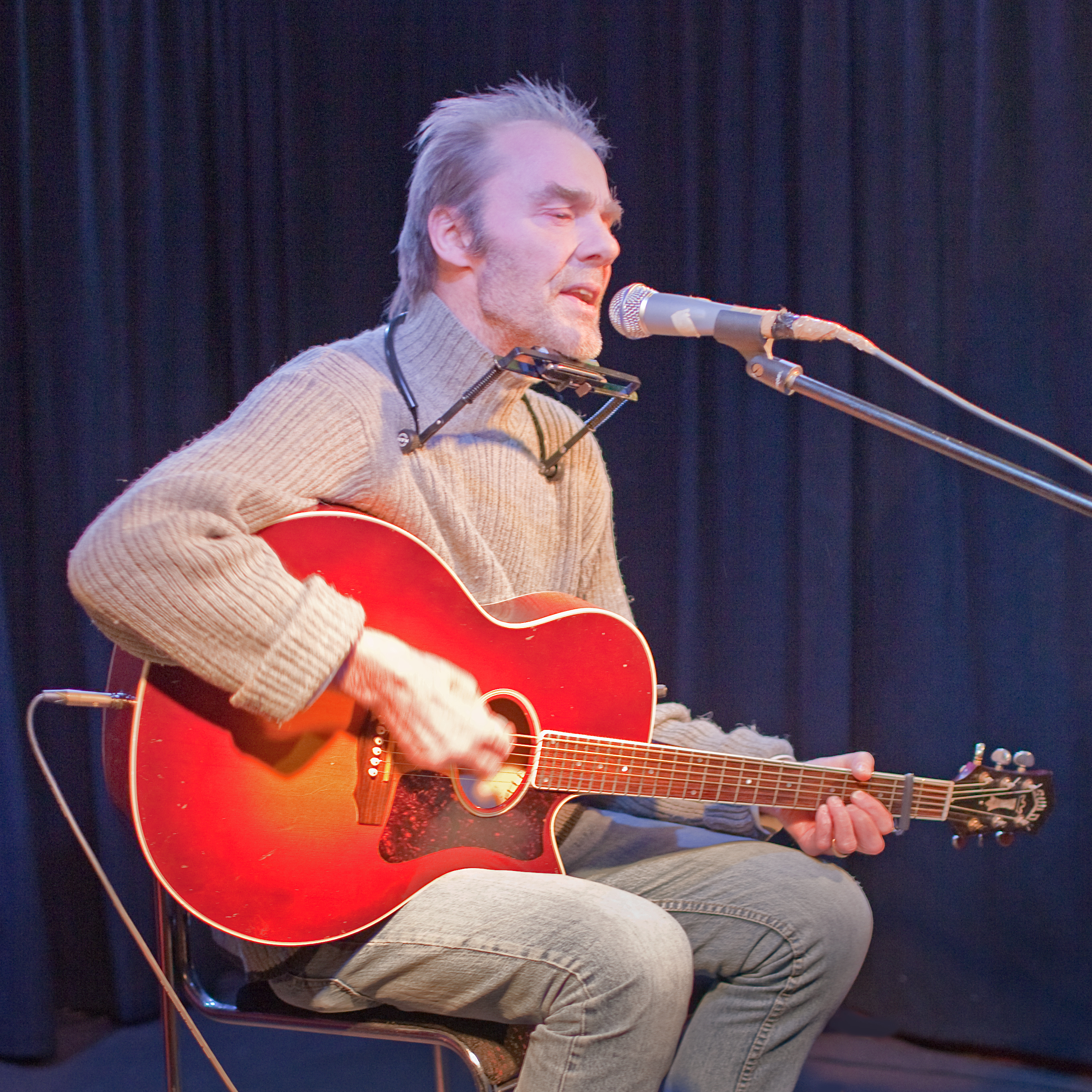

Background information
- Born: 21 May 1952
- Died: 26 February 2019
- Formerly of: Grymlings and Landslaget

Erik Magnus Lindberg (21 May 1952 – 26 February 2019) was a Swedish musician, singer and composer. He was a member of the musical bands Grymlings and Landslaget, and also worked as a solo artist.
