= Balladen om killen =

1969 single by Örjan Ramberg

- Mercury Records sleeve

Single by Örjan
- Language: Swedish
- A-side: "Balladen om killen, del 1"
- B-side: "Balladen om killen, del 2"
- Released: September 1969
- Recorded: 3 August 1969
- Studio: Europafilm, Stockholm
- Genre: Rock
- Length: 2:34
- Label: CBS; Mercury
- Songwriter: Göran Lagerberg
- Producer: Göran Lagerberg

Örjan singles chronology
"Balladen om killen" (1969)	"Skål" (1985)

Audio
- "Balladen om killen, del 1" on YouTube

Audio
- "Balladen om killen, del 2" on YouTube

"Balladen om killen" (English: "Ballad about the guy") is a song written by bass guitarist Göran Lagerberg, recorded by singer Örjan Ramberg. Inspired by the life of Ramberg, Lagerberg composed the song as a reflection over both their lives inspired by Bob Dylan's "Like a Rolling Stone". The song, which is in the Swedish language, tells the tale of an unnamed narrator, who during a walk along a country road, details incidents that recently occurred in his life, including moving away from home, tongue-in-cheek references to acquaintances and the court proceedings after being caught with cannabis.

Lagerberg largely intended for the song to be a side project for his band Blond, which was the successor of Swedish band Tages. Despite this, Blond members Lasse Svensson and Björn Lindér appear on the recording, which took place at Europafilm Studio in Stockholm. Lagerberg produced the session and sang the A-side. Despite sharing titles, the A and B-sides are separate songs musically.

Upon release in September 1969, "Balladen om killen" was due to a clerical mixup released on two separate record labels, CBS and Mercury Records. Despite Lagerberg's role in the production of the song, it was only credited to Ramberg under his first name. The song became a commercial failure, only reaching number 13 on Tio i Topp for a week, which many critics attribute to its controversial lyrics. Nonetheless, the song garnered positive reviews in the press following the release and has been considered a pioneering song in the development of rock in the Swedish language.

== Background ==
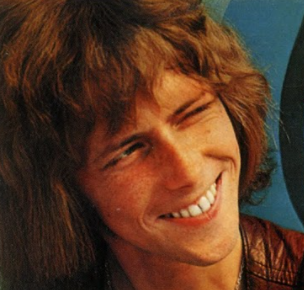
Göran Lagerberg in 1969

By 1969, Swedish rock band Tages had undergone several changes to their line-up; lead vocalist Tommy Blom had left the band the previous year. They had also changed their name to Blond, following a meeting with Richard Reese-Edwards. However, following recording sessions in March for their next album, the guitarists Danne Larsson and Anders Töpel left the band, citing the obligatory conscription Sweden had as a contributing reason. As a result, bassist Göran Lagerberg, who had composed most of Tages and Blond's output, had started looking into different musical ventures during the time they looked for new band members; it was the first such opportunity he had been given since 1964, when they had their breakthrough hit.

Meanwhile, in Gothenburg, a young aspiring actor and singer named Örjan Ramberg had started becoming popular on the underground musical scene in the city as he fronted a band named Que, who were a house band at the popular Cue Club. Tages, who frequently attended and performed at the club, were thus introduced to Ramberg, who struck up a friendship with the band, particularly Lagerberg, who saw the potential in him. This collaboration between Tages and Ramberg would largely culminate in the latter being called upon as a stand-in singer in place of Blom during various performances, including an instance which he had an appendectomy. As a result, Lagerberg became interested in producing recordings together with Ramberg, which he could fulfill during his time in Blond.

== Recording and composition ==
After writing the song, Lagerberg rehearsed it together with fellow Blond members Lasse Svensson and Björn Lindér, who recently had joined their line-up. At the initiative of Lagerberg, Ramberg was also later included in a rehearsal of the song, which resulted in Lagerberg booking studio time on 3 August 1969. It was recorded at Europafilm in Bromma, where most of Tages recordings were conducted. Because Lagerberg considered the recording a solo project unrelated to Blond, their producer Anders Henriksson was not present at the session, with the bassist himself taking the role of production during the recording. Nonetheless, recording engineer Björn Almstedt was present during the session, and is credited with adding the sound effect of a police siren which can be heard halfway through the song. Despite being considered a solo project, Svensson and Lindér were present during the session and contributed their respective instruments of drums and lead guitar. Lindér, a multi-instrumentalist, also overdubbed rhythm guitar, piano and organ to the song, in addition to backing vocals.

"Ramberg's first - and so far only - single is a fascinating and peculiar recording in many ways. A pop culture phenomenon, if you will"

— Linus Kuhlin (2017)

Musically, despite the title on the single signifying it was split into two parts due to length it is rather two separate musical compositions altogether. The A-side of the single was largely composed in A major and is contrary to the title, "a straight-forward rocker" which features "boogie-woogie piano" and "lush" guitar licks that prevails throughout. The B-side on the contrary is according to Linus Kuhlin "much closer to a ballad", which also features "great guitar licks". Strangely, it is not Ramberg who sings on the A-side, but rather Lagerberg. The reason behind this varies; according to Göran Brandels and Lennart Wrigholm, Ramberg was not comfortable with singing the song and with time running out, Lagerberg himself sang on it. Other sources however claims that Lagerberg was a perfectionist and chose to record the vocals himself because his vocals were superior to Ramberg's. Nonetheless, Ramberg does sing lead vocals on the B-side, contrary to popular conception.

Despite the musical composition, the song is best known for the lyrics. According to the book Tusen Svenska Klassiker, "Balladen om killen" was Lagerberg's attempt at a Swedish rewrite of Bob Dylan's "Like a Rolling Stone" (1965); "a compelling rock song" which featured "driving verses" about "moving out" and the "sexual freedom" and opportunities that open up with this. According to Kuhlin, Lagerberg largely "succeeds with the task", stating that the song is a "condensed epic" regarding a guy and "his fate, in this case Ramberg". The lyrics were largely inspired by Ramberg's own life, though it included several lines alluding to Lagerberg's own life, including lines about a getting a summoning to court because of possession of cannabis; this largely mirrors an incident in which Blom was busted with the drug in 1967, which resulted in headlines across the Swedish media. "Balladen om killen" is one of few songs written by Lagerberg in Swedish, as he considers English to be the language of rock.

The lyrics follow a man walking down a country road recalling incidents which happened in the past, such as being cocky to his school teachers. The song alludes to falling in love with the girlfriend of Hans Lindberg, who was an acquaintance of Lagerberg and his tongue-in-cheek appearance in the song was intended as a joke against him. A reference to a woman who the narrator describes as having "large breasts and the common sense to keep quiet" was according to Kuhlin the most "dated aspect of the song", which by then was "written almost fifty years ago". The song also describes alcoholism among the narrator's social group, along with a line which alludes bringing gay men home; Brandels and Wrigholm cite this as an example of the song being lyrically ahead of its time relative to what other writers were putting out then.

== Release and commercial performance ==
The song was released approximately a month after it had been recorded, in September 1969. Despite the heavy involvement of Lagerberg, it was only credited to Ramberg under his first name Örjan. Unusually, the single was issued on two different labels during the same time, CBS Records International, on which it became the second release, and Mercury Records. The two different releases both have different picture sleeves and were the error of Ramberg's publishing company, who had mixed up the single release. Kuhlin states that the nonchalant attitude to the release added to the confusion; he noted that record buyers most likely would not have known who Ramberg was, let alone when the release was solely credited to his first name, though notes the "men in suits at the record companies" most likely assumed how the image of him on the picture sleeve would generate sales amongst teenage girls because "he was extremely handsome".

"Balladen om killen" did however take a while to be tested on Tio i Topp, a reason which was most likely attributed to the record label mixup. It was tested on 6 December 1969, reaching a position of only number 13, one of the lower rankings of the chart. This was additionally the only week the song appeared on the chart, as it was voted off the following week. Because of this, the song also failed to reach sales chart Kvällstoppen. As a result, it was one of the worst performing singles in Lagerberg's career, despite never being released in his name. Nonetheless, the relatively poor chart performance was blamed on the controversial lyrics, specifically the lines regarding gay men and the ones explicitly talking about "large breasts". Critics agree that the single most likely would've fared better on the Swedish music scene if it was credited under Lagerberg or Blond's name rather than the at the time unknown Ramberg.

At the time of its release, the song did not appear on any album, partly due to the obscene and controversial lyrics, and also due to the fact that the record labels dropped Ramberg shortly after it failed on Tio i Topp. Both sides of the single were however included on the 2003 re-issue of Blond's album The Lilac Years as bonus tracks; this was their first release on an album.

== Reception and legacy ==
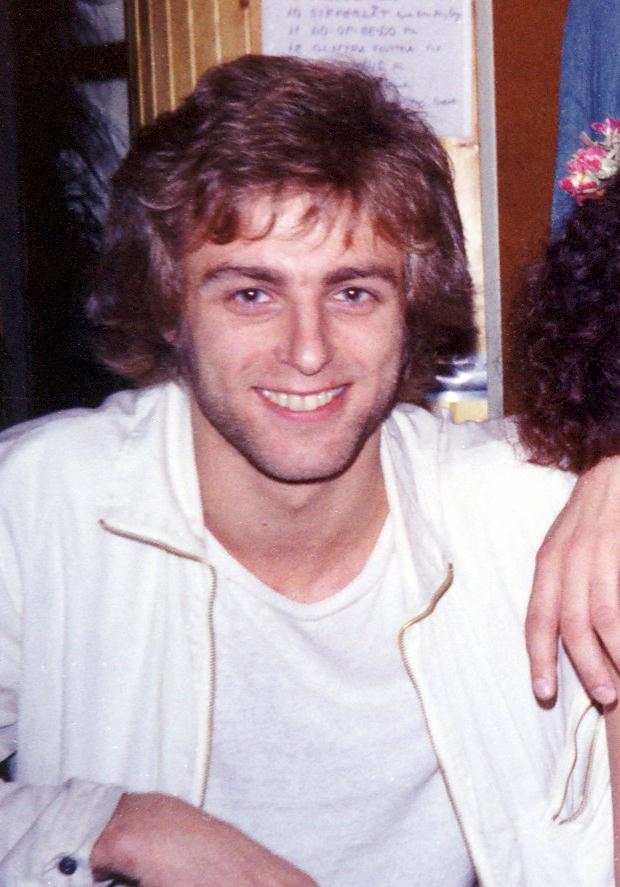
Ramberg in 1974. Following the single, he abandoned his musical career in favour of one in acting.

Upon release in Sweden, the single was met with primarily positive reviews, with most reviewers noting the lyrics along with the backing band. In a review for Dagens Nyheter, the staff writer states that the single seems to be "one of the latest and best" on the Swedish music scene as of yet. They state that the lyrics seem a "tad ironic" given the subject matter and the inclusion of several references to alcohol and cannabis might be "too inappropriate for mainstream" radio, though the staff writer ends by noting how the single is a decent addition to the wave of new singles appearing. In Aftonbladet, a writer describes the single as "decent" with "thought-provoking" lyrics which add some "humour to the song", while also praising the backing band, particularly Lindér's guitar work, for the "driving yet interesting backing".

In Expressen, the staff writer seemed a bit more skeptical about the lyrics of the song, stating that they might be considered "vile and disgusting" among various groups of people, particularly "the elders", though writing it is based on a decent backing "by an obviously competent group of musicians" giving the single a "feeling of American rock and roll". A writer for Svenska Dagbladet believes the single to have a "very effective" and "driving backing" to go along with the lyrics, which they write are "surprisingly vulgar and modern" for being written in Swedish. They additionally claim that the single either will become the "biggest Swedish hit of the year or a complete flop", basing it on whether or not the teenagers listening to it "dig it or not".

According to Kuhlin, "Balladen om killen" popularized rock music in the Swedish language during a time in which the genre was dominated by the English language. He states that virtually no other Swedish artist sang rock in their native tongue. At the time, virtually only easy listening or dansband acts were performing music in Swedish; the release of the single brought a change to the Swedish music scene, which would eventually lead to the rise of the Progg movement. Although many critics insist that Pugh Rogefeldt's album Ja, dä ä dä, which was released at the same time as "Balladen om killen", was the basis for rock music in Sweden, Kuhlin bases his opinion on the fact that Ramberg and Lagerberg were unaware of Rogefeldt's recording and thinks they both should be "seen as pioneers of Swedish-language rock".

Following the release of the single, Ramberg chose to pursue a career as an actor, with "Balladen om killen" remaining as his only solo release. Although he would be featured on later recordings such as the 1985 single "Skål!" together with acts such as Siw Malmkvist, and Martin Ljung, they were never solely credited to Ramberg. Despite only being moderately commercially successful, the song was a popular record to play at nightclubs in Sweden for years to come. Following the 2019 allegation of abuse against his partner Josefin Nilsson, the lyrical content of "Balladen om killen" was once again brought into the spotlight in the Swedish media.

== Personnel ==
Personnel according to the book Boken om Tages: från Avenyn till Abbey Road.

- Örjan Ramberg – lead vocals (side 2)
- Göran Lagerberg – lead vocals (side 1), harmony vocals (side 2), bass guitar, producer
- Björn Lindér – harmony vocals (side 2), lead and rhythm guitars, piano, organ
- Lasse Svensson – drums, percussion
- Björn Almstedt – studio engineer

== Charts ==
Weekly chart performance for "Balladen om killen"
Chart (1969)	Peak position
Sweden (Tio i Topp)	13

== Sources ==
- Brandels, Göran; Wrigholm, Lennart (2012). Boken om Tages: från Avenyn till Abbey Road (in Swedish). Premium Publishing. ISBN 978-91-89136-88-5.
- Hallberg, Eric; Henningsson, Ulf (2012). Tio i Topp - med de utslagna "på försök" 1961–74 (in Swedish). Premium Publishing. ISBN 978-91-89136-89-2.
- Kuhlin, Linus (24 July 2017). "Balladen om 'Balladen om killen'". Hymn (in Swedish).
- Sidén, Hans (1991). 60-talspop i Göteborg: Tages, Cue och jag och du. Tre Böcker Förlag. ISBN 91-7029-575-1.
- Wiremark, Kjell (1994). Tages – This One's For You! (CD) (in Swedish). EMI. 4751382.
- Wrigholm, Lennart (1991). "Tages: Makalös grej i Götet…". Now & then (in Swedish).
