= Crazy 'Bout My Baby =

1963 single by Robert Mosley

Single by Robert Mosley
- A-side: "Goodbye My Lover Goodbye"
- Released: April 22, 1963
- Recorded: 1963
- Studio: Capitol Studios, New York City
- Genre: Soul; Funk
- Length: 2:57
- Label: Capitol
- Songwriter: Robert Mosley
- Producer: Bert Keyes

Robert Mosley singles chronology
"You Ought To Know" (1961)	"Crazy 'Bout My Baby" (1963)

"Crazy 'Bout My Baby" is a song first written and recorded by musician Robert Mosley in 1963. His third solo single, it failed to chart, leading to it becoming his final single released. Initially an obscure single, it was brought to light by mainstream acts such as The Swinging Blue Jeans and Tages, the latter of which charted in Sweden with it.

== Robert Mosley version ==
Around this time, Mosley was mostly well-known for his work with other musicians; he had written several chart hits for other artists, including two top-20 Billboard Hot 100 hits; "Big Cold Wind" by Pat Boone and "Sha La La" by the Shirelles, although Manfred Mann made it a chart hit. However, in his solo career, Mosley had barely made an impact on the national charts. He had previously released two solo singles, excluding one he recorded with Mayme Watts in 1961. In 1963, he once again attempted to record a single during a session at Capitol Studios, with musician Bert Keyes producing, something he had not often done before. The single was eventually released on April 22, 1963 through Capitol Records.

His rendition features a string "big band" arrangement along with female backing vocals, of which all was done by Keyes. Although the single initially to chart, it was ranked a three-star single by Billboard's May 4, 1963 issue. The reverse side (which was erroneously issued as an A-side) "Goodbye My Lover Goodbye" was covered by the Searchers in 1965, reaching number four in the UK singles chart.

== Tages version ==
"Crazy 'Bout My Baby"

Single by Tages

from the album Tages 2
- B-side: "Go"
- Released: October 21, 1966
- Recorded: May–June 1966
- Studio: Europafilm Studios, Stockholm
- Genre: Flamenco rock
- Length: 3:02
- Label: Platina
- Songwriter: Mosley
- Producer: Tages

Tages singles chronology
"In My Dreams" (1966)	"Crazy 'Bout My Baby" (1966)	"Miss Mac Baren" (1966)

Swedish rock band Tages recorded a rendition of "Crazy 'Bout My Baby" in 1966. Tages had by this point in history achieved several top-10 singles in Sweden, both original compositions along with covers. In 1966, they had released three singles; "So Many Girls", "I'll Be Doggone" and "In My Dreams", the latter of which proved to be Tages biggest hit throughout their career, reaching number 1 on both Kvällstoppen and Tio i Topp in August 1966. This was during the peak of their success in Sweden, both commercially, critically and influentially, as they were experimenting with recording their second studio album Tages 2, which blends both original compositions and covers. "Crazy 'Bout My Baby" was chosen to be recorded for the album, and the arrangement seems to be heavily inspired by the Swinging Blue Jeans version which was released almost a year prior, as it incorporates a similar song structure during the solo. The group would work on the track between May and June 1966 at Europafilm Studios in Bromma, a suburb of Stockholm, Sweden.

"Crazy 'Bout My Baby" was eventually released on Tages 2 through Platina Records on 4 August 1966, approximately during the same time "In My Dreams" peaked on the charts. Platina would then demand a follow-up to "In My Dreams" when it dropped off the chart in mid-September, and the group chose "Crazy 'Bout My Baby" as the follow-up. The single was released on October 21, 1966, backed with the group's original composition "Go" by Platina Records. The single first entered Kvällstoppen on November 15, at a position of 19, before going to number 18 the following week. On December 29, the single peaked at number 16 before dropping off the chart completely. It did not even enter Tio i Topp, being voted off at a position of number 15.

The single became Tages first major commercial failure, as all their previous singles had charted within the top-5 (par "The One For You" and "I'll Be Doggone", which charted at number 6 and 10 respectively) Ultimately, "Crazy 'Bout My Baby" became lowest charting song they'd ever released, with the exception of singles which failed to chart completely. However, the group followed the slight chart disappointment with "Miss Mac Baren", which peaked at number 1 on Kvällstoppen and number 4 on Tio i Topp. The single was the first to feature Tommy Tausis on drums, as Freddie Skantze had left prior to recording it.

=== Personnel ===
- Tommy Blom – percussion, backing vocals
- Danne Larsson – organ, rhythm guitar, backing vocals
- Göran Lagerberg – bass guitar, co-lead vocals
- Anders Töpel – lead guitar, backing vocals
- Tommy Tausis – drums, co-lead vocals

=== Charts ===
Chart (1966)	Peak position
Sweden (Kvällstoppen)	16
Sweden (Tio i Topp)	15

== Other covers ==
- British rock group The Swinging Blue Jeans recorded a rendition of "Crazy 'Bout My Baby", with "Good Lovin'" as the B-side and released it as a single through His Master's Voice on 1 October 1965. Although it failed to chart in the UK Singles Chart, this rendition of the song heavily changed the arrangement and is most likely the one Tages copies from.
