= Pugh Rogefeldt =

Swedish singer, songwriter and musician (1947–2023)

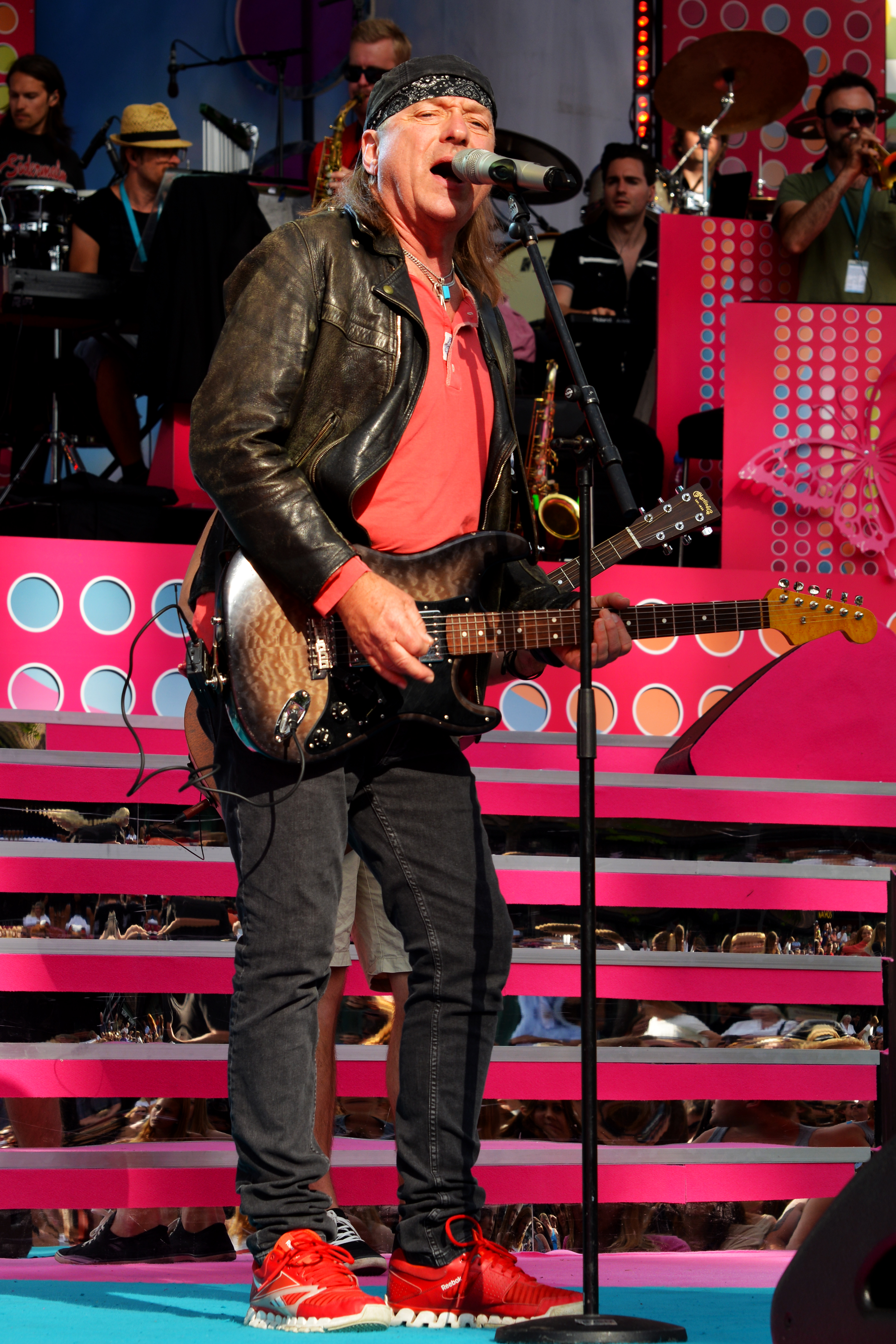
- Rogefeldt performing in 2013
- Born: Anders Sture Torbjörn Rogefeldt; 2 March 1947; Västerås, Sweden
- Died: 1 May 2023 (aged 76)
- Occupations: Singer; songwriter; musician
- Years active: 1968–2021
- Musical career
- Genres: Rock; pop; psychedelia
- Instruments: Vocals; guitar; harmonica
- Labels: EMI; Metronome; WEA
- Website: pugh.nu

Anders Sture Torbjörn "Pugh" Rogefeldt (Swedish pronunciation: [ˈrûːɡɛˌfɛlt], (Note: His own pronunciation.) [ˈrôːɡ-]; 2 March 1947 – 1 May 2023) was a Swedish singer, musician, guitarist and songwriter.

== Musical career ==
Rogefeldt made his breakthrough in the late 1960s with albums such as Ja, dä ä dä and Pughish. Unlike most other Swedish pop musicians who wanted to achieve international success, he sang in Swedish. One song which is commonly associated with Rogefeldt is "Små lätta moln". Other major hits include "Här kommer natten", "Föräldralåten", "Hog Farm", "Dinga Linga Lena" and "Stockholm". In the 1970s, he toured with this band Rainrock, together with Ola Magnell and Janne Lucas Persson. A live double LP was released from this tour, entitled Ett steg till.

Rogefeldt was passionate about Old Norse religion and developed a personal outlook where the god Thor was particularly important to him. He said rock music and Old Norse religion share central attributes and sought to fuse them together on the album Hammarhjärta (1985).

In the early 1990s, he was also a member of Grymlings, alongside Göran Lagerberg, Mikael Rickfors and Magnus Lindberg.

The intro from Rogefeldt's "Love, Love, Love" track (from the 1969 album Ja, Dä Ä Dä!) is notable for being sampled and used by DJ Shadow on "Mutual Slump" (from the 1996 album Endtroducing.....).

== Death ==
Rogefeldt died on 1 May 2023, at the age of 76 from corticobasal degeneration.

== Discography ==
=== Albums ===
- 1969 – Ja, dä ä dä
- 1970 – Pughish
- 1972 – Hollywood
- 1973 – Pugh on the Rocks
- 1974 – Bolla och Rulla
- 1975 – Ett steg till
- 1977 – Bamalama
- 1978 – Attityder
- 1981 – Het
- 1983 – Face
- 1985 – Hammarhjärta
- 1986 – Pugh Rogefeldt
- 1991 – Människors Hantverk
- 1999 – Pugh Maraton
- 2008 – Vinn hjärta vinn

=== Collections ===
- 2003 – Pugh Boxen
- 2003 – Pughs Bästa
- 2012 – Dä Va' Då Dä' Pugh Rogefeldts Bästa 1969–2012

=== with Grymlings ===
- 1990 – Grymlings
- 1992 – Grymlings II
