= Tages (album) =

1965 studio album by Tages

Studio album by Tages
- Released: 3 November 1965
- Recorded: 5 August − 6 October 1965
- Studio: EMI, Stockholm
- Genre: rock; rhythm and blues; garage rock; beat
- Length: 34:18
- Label: Platina
- Producer: Anders Henriksson

Tages chronology
Tages (EP) (1965)	Tages (1965)	Tages 2 (1966)

Singles from Tages
- 1. "Sleep Little Girl" Released: 16 October 1964; 2. "The One For You" Released: 15 August 1965; 3. "Bloodhound" Released: 19 November 1965; 4. "Doctor Feel-Good" Released: 5 June 1968

Tages is the debut studio album by the Swedish rock band Tages, released on 3 November 1965 on Platina Records. Released during a period in which the band had accumulated four top ten singles in Tio i Topp and as many on Kvällstoppen. This led the band to become one of Sweden's first and foremost pop groups, along with Hep Stars.

It was their first of three albums recorded on Platina Records, after which they'd switch to Parlophone, becoming among the first Swedish groups to do so. Issued in 6000 copies, it sold 10000 and became their first Gold record in Sweden (the second being Tages 2). Despite this apparent success, it failed to chart on Kvällstoppen.

== Content ==
The album features several garage rock and rhythm and blues standards such as "Dimples" and "Got My Mojo Working" (titled "I Got My Mojo Working" on the album) and can be considered a typical album for the era. However, unlike contemporary albums by other Swedish groups, Tages composed their own material, of which two are on the album. These are "Sleep Little Girl", their first single that hit number one on Tio i Topp and number three on Kvällstoppen. This was the third re-recording of the track as it differs from the single version. The other original composition is "The One For You" which was also released as a single and reached number two on Tio I Topp and number six on Kvällstoppen. "The One For You" is the oldest recorded track on the album, recorded on 5 August 1965.

Other tracks on the album include their cover of "Bloodhound" which was released as a single and reached number six on Tio I Topp, but fared better on Kvällstoppen where it reached number three. The non-album B-Side of that single is one of the first covers of Ian Samwell and Brian Potter's "Whatcha Gonna Do About It", which was released as the Small Faces debut single on 6 August 1965. Tages would go on and make one more Small Faces cover, "Understanding", which appears on their third studio album Extra Extra.

Vocally, the album is democratically divided, with Tommy Blom singing solo on three songs. Göran Lagerberg sings solo on one song and the rest are harmony vocals, performed by various members of the band, including drummer Freddie Skantze and Blom on "Stand by Me"

In contrast to their later albums, which consisted of approximately half-to all tracks original material, Tages only feature two such songs. Tages is the band's only album where their rhythm-and-blues based origins and influences are strongly present; on subsequent albums this is overshadowed by more conventional pop songs and (especially on their three final studio albums) psychedelic-influenced material. "Doctor Feel-Good" would strangely be released as a single by Platina in May 1968; it failed to chart.

== Track listing ==
Side one
No.	Title	Writer(s)	Lead vocals	Length
1.	"Bloodhound"	Larry Bright	Tommy Blom	2:21
2.	"Everybody Loves a Lover"	Robert Allen; Richard Adler	Anders Töpel	2:14
3.	"Dimples"	John Lee Hooker; James Bracken	Göran Lagerberg	3:03
4.	"I Got My Mojo Working"	McKinley Morganfield	Blom	4:33
5.	"Naggin'"	Jerry West; Jimmy Anderson	Blom	3:52
6.	"Sleep Little Girl"	Tommy Blom	Blom	2:27
Total length:				18:30

Side two
No.	Title	Writer(s)	Lead vocals	Length
1.	"The One For You"	Danne Larsson	Lagerberg; Danne Larsson	2:34
2.	"Seventh Son"	Willie Dixon	Blom	3:14
3.	"I'll Go Crazy"	James Brown	Larsson	2:21
4.	"Cathy's Clown"	Don Everly	Lagerberg; Töpel	2:23
5.	"Doctor Feel-Good"	Curtis Smith	Larsson	2:12
6.	"Stand by Me"	Dean Beard; Ray Doggett; Slim Willet	Blom	3:04
Total length:				15:48

(note that the track listing was printed with a few errors on first pressings; "I Got My Mojo Working" is commonly thought to be written by Preston "Red" Foster, while others claim McKinley Morganfield (Muddy Waters) wrote it. "Stand By Me" was written by Ben E. King, Jerry Leiber and Mike Stoller, not by Dean Beard, Ray Doggett and Slim Willet as the album claims)

== Personnel ==
=== Tages ===
- Tommy Blom – vocals, guitar, harmonica
- Danne Larsson – rhythm guitar, vocals
- Göran Lagerberg – bass guitar, vocals
- Anders Töpel – lead guitar, vocals
- Freddie Skantze – drums, percussion

=== Other musicians ===
- Anders Henriksson – piano

=== Technical ===
- Anders Henriksson – producer, studio engineer
- Björn Norén – studio engineer
- Peter Knopp – album cover photo
- Hans Sidén – illustrations, layout and liner notes

== Singles ==
Year	Song	B-side	Chart positions	
Year	Song	B-side	Kvällstoppen	Tio i Topp
1964	"Sleep Little Girl"	"Tell Me You're Mine"	4	1
1965	"The One For You"	"I Got My Mojo Working"	6	2
1965	"Bloodhound"	"Whatcha Gonna Do About It"	3	6
1968	"Doctor Feel-Good"	"I'm Mad"	—	—

== Charts ==
Weekly chart performance for Tages
Chart (1965)	Peak
Finnish Albums (Suomen virallinen lista)	3
