= Robert Mosely =

American singer

- Born: Robert Henry Mosely, Jr.
- Origin: United States
- Genres: Pop music
- Occupations: Singer, songwriter, producer
- Years active: Fifties and Sixties
- Labels: Capitol, Coed, Glory, MGM, Roulette

Robert Henry Mosely, Jr., sometimes written as Mosley, is an American singer, songwriter and producer. He has recorded singles as a solo artist as well as in the duo Mayme & Robert. Mosely is best known for co-writing the songs "Sha-La-La" and "Midnight Flyer".

== Biography ==
He recorded several singles at the end of the fifties and in the first half of the sixties, as a solo singer as well as in the duo Mayme & Robert. In 1963 he issued "Crazy 'Bout My Baby" which was covered in Sweden by Tages. The B-side, "Goodbye My Lover Goodbye", was popular among some artists and was covered more than ten times. The Searchers had an international hit with it, under the title "Goodbye My Love" in 1965, and Mosely's recording of the song was included on the soundtrack for the 2018 film Green Book. Mosely was (co-)writer of these songs.

All together twelve of his (co-)compositions reached the Billboard Hot 100. Artists that recorded his music were, among others, Nat King Cole, Sarah Vaughan, The Shirelles, The Ventures, Pat Boone, Connie Francis, Patti Page, Manfred Mann and The Cats.

He worked together sometimes with Luther Dixon in these years.

== Singles ==
As solo singer

- 1960: "Not Until I Lost You" / "Just a Little More"
- 1960: "Crazy Moonlight" / "Just About Time"
- 1963: "Crazy 'Bout My Baby" / "Goodbye My Lover Goodbye"

In Mayme & Robert

- 1961: "That's When" / "You Ought To Know"
- "Parting Tears"
- "Sweet Lips"
- "Ain't No Way in the World" / "Parting Tears"
