= Extra Extra (album) =

Studio album by Tages
- Released: 28 November 1966
- Recorded: November 1966
- Studio: Europafilm, Stockholm
- Genre: Psychedelic rock; psychedelic pop; freakbeat; hard rock; R&B
- Length: 33:22
- Label: Platina
- Producer: Anders Henriksson; Tages

Tages chronology
Tages 2 (1966)	Extra Extra (1966)	Contrast (1967)

Singles from Extra Extra
- 1. "Secret Room" Released: January 1967; 2. "Gone Too Far" Released: April 1967; 3. "One Red, One Yellow, One Blue" Released: July 1967; 4. "Mohair Sam" Released: December 1967

Extra Extra is the third studio album by the Swedish rock band Tages, released on 28 November 1966 by Platina Records. Their third and final album on Platina, it was issued only four months after their second studio album Tages 2. The album was largely recorded during a period in which the band had started evolving into a psychedelic rock group, something that became evident on their two final efforts, Contrast and Studio. The album was recorded during a period in which Tages underwent several lineup changes. It's their first effort not to feature drummer Freddie Skantze, who left following the recording of Tages 2, and is the second and final album with drummer and vocalist Tommy Tausis, who'd played on several tracks on Tages 2. He left following the recording of Extra Extra, and was replaced by Lasse Svensson (brother of Lill-Babs)

The album yielded four singles, all of which were released the following year. None of them managed to chart on either Kvällstoppen or Tio I Topp. However, the sessions managed to produce a non-album single, "Miss Mac Baren", backed with "Get Up An' Get Goin'", which was a slightly bigger success, reaching number one on Kvällstoppen and number four on Tio I Topp. "Miss Mac Baren" became among their biggest hits and eventually their signature song (along with "Sleep Little Girl"). Just like all previous releases, Extra Extra was issued in 6000 copies, but failed to become a gold album, which both previous albums had been. It did not chart on Kvällstoppen, but did however, reach number twenty on Norway's VG-lista in May 1967.

== Content ==
=== Overview ===
Just like Tages 2, the album features several original compositions. Unlike that album which credits all original tracks to the band, they're individually credited on Extra Extra. While Tages 2 featured six original compositions, Extra Extra only features five. This is most likely due to the short span in between them, being only four months. Extra Extra is the first album by Tages which solely feature drummer Tommy Tausis. He'd previously been featured on Tages 2, on which he plays only four tracks; "Dancing in the Street", "Jealous Girl", "Crazy 'Bout My Baby" and "Go". Unlike covers on their other albums, (such as rhythm and blues on Tages) the covers on this album are mostly made up of contemporary recordings, such as one of the earliest covers of both the Easybeats "Friday on my Mind", which had been released as a single and reached number thirteen on Kvällstoppen and number ten on Tio I Topp. And a rendition of Small Faces "Understanding", which had been the B-Side of their single "All or Nothing" and reached number fifteen on Kvällstoppen and number five on Tio I Topp. They'd previously covered another Small Faces song, "Whatcha Gonna Do About It", which was released as the B-Side for "Bloodhound" in 1965. It also features several rhythm and blues standards such as "Mustang Sally" and "Howlin' For My Baby"

One stand-alone single was released parallel to the album, that being "Miss Mac Baren". The single originated when the band toured in Odense, Denmark, when they were contacted by Platina regarding a new Beatles-single and had to rush it out on the market. "Miss Mac Baren" was released in November, backed by "Get Up An' Get Goin" and became their biggest hit during this time. Beyond "Miss Mac Baren", an additional four singles were extracted and released from Extra Extra. The first one was "Secret Room", which was released two months later in January the following year. It was backed by "Friday On My Mind". The second single was released two months after "Secret Room", that being "Gone Too Far" in April of that year. It was backed by "Understanding". The third was "One Red, One Yellow, One Blue" which was released in July backed by "True Fine Woman". The final single wasn't released until over a year after Extra Extra, when "Mohair Sam" backed with "Ride Your Pony" was released in December of that year. None of these singles managed to chart on either Kvällstoppen or Tio I Topp, and their releases are a contributing factor to why the band switched to Parlophone.

=== Vocals and album cover ===
Unlike previous efforts, where Tommy Blom had been restricted to singing only a handful of songs, his role is made bigger on Extra Extra on which he sings lead on several tracks, including "Secret Room" and "One Red, One Yellow, One Blue". Göran Lagerberg once again sings on several tracks, which include "Gone Too Far" and "Mohair Sam". The album cover is unique in that it is the only cover by the band which does not depict them in any way. Instead, a huge black background makes up the majority of the cover, with white, large letters forming the word "TAGES!", along with the Platina logo in the left corner. A white bar makes up a large part of the top, in which blue and red letters display the words Extra Extra. The band, along with the track listing, are seen on the back.

== Track listing ==
Side one
No.	Title	Writer(s)	Lead vocals	Length
1.	"Mohair Sam"	Dallas Frazier	Göran Lagerberg	1:53
2.	"Secret Room"	Tommy Blom	Tommy Blom; Tommy Tausis	2:00
3.	"Gone Too Far"	Göran Lagerberg	Lagerberg	3:02
4.	"Get Up An' Get Goin'"	Anders Henriksson; Thorstein Bergman	Blom; Lagerberg	2:37
5.	"Mustang Sally"	Bonny "Mack" Rice	Lagerberg	3:52
6.	"Howlin' For My Baby"	Chester Burnett; Willie Dixon	Blom	2:56
Total length:				16:20

Side two
No.	Title	Writer(s)	Lead vocals	Length
1.	"Friday On My Mind"	George Young; Harry Vanda	Blom	2:36
2.	"True Fine Woman"	Lagerberg	Lagerberg	2:33
3.	"Ride Your Pony"	Naomi Neville	Blom	3:11
4.	"One Red, One Yellow, One Blue"	Blom; Anders Töpel	Blom; Anders Töpel	2:38
5.	"Understanding"	Steve Marriott; Ronnie Lane	Lagerberg	3:16
6.	"Extra"	Henriksson; Danne Larsson	Danne Larsson; Anders Henriksson	2:48
Total length:				17:02

== Personnel ==
=== Tages ===
- Göran Lagerberg – vocals, bass guitar
- Tommy Blom – vocals, percussion
- Anders Töpel – lead and rhythm guitar, vocals
- Danne Larsson – rhythm and lead guitar, keyboards, vocals
- Tommy Tausis – drums, vocals

=== Additional Musicians ===
- Anders "Henkan" Henriksson – keyboards, vocals
- Lasse Samuelsson's Orchestra – wind instruments

=== Technical ===
- Anders "Henkan" Henriksson – producer
- Tages – producer
- Björn Almstedt – producer

== Singles ==
=== Singles ===
Year	Song	B-side
1967	"Secret Room"	"Friday On My Mind"
1967	"Gone Too Far"	"Understanding"
1967	"One Red, One Yellow, One Blue"	"True Fine Woman"
1967	"Mohair Sam"	"Ride Your Pony"

=== B-sides ===
Year	B-side	A-side	Chart positions	
Year	B-side	A-side	Kvällstoppen	Tio I Topp
1966	"Get Up An' Get Goin"	"Miss Mac Baren"	1	4
