= Tages 2 =

1966 album by Tages

Studio album by Tages
- Released: 4 August 1966
- Recorded: May – July 1966
- Studio: Europafilm, Stockholm
- Genre: Pop; folk; folk rock; rhythm and blues; freakbeat
- Length: 30:10
- Label: Platina
- Producer: Tages

Tages chronology
Tages (1965)	Tages 2 (1966)	Extra Extra (1966)

Singles from Tages 2
- 1. "In My Dreams" Released: July 1966; 2. "Crazy 'Bout My Baby" Released: October 1966; 3. "Dancing in the Street" Released: October 1967

Tages 2 (commonly referred to as LP 2 or just 2) is the second studio album by the Swedish rock band Tages, released on 4 August 1966 by Platina Records. Often considered their artistic breakthrough, six out of twelve tracks are original compositions.

The album was recorded and released during a tense moment for the group, where drummer Freddie Skantze was just about to leave the group; he was briefly replaced by Tommy "TT" Tausis, who plays on four tracks on the album. Tages 2 would be the final albums for Skantze as he left following the recording, and Tausis would go on to play on Extra Extra before leaving towards the end of 1966. Both were replaced by drummer Lasse Svensson.

Just like its predecessor Tages, it was issued in 6000 copies, and sold over 10000, becoming their second and last album certified in Sweden. Tages 2 yielded three singles of which two charted. The album itself did not chart on Kvällstoppen.

== Content ==
=== Overview ===
In contrast to both their debut and later studio albums is that Tages 2 was self produced. The content is a lot more varied than their previous effort, in that it greatly contrasts in genres. The first track "Dancing in the Street" captures the spirit of their debut. It is also on this track that Tommy Tausis makes his debut; he sings and plays drums on the track. On tracks such as "I Still Remember", "In My Dreams", and "Go", influences from folk rock are apparent. On the album, six original compositions are present, of which five are credited to Tommy Blom, Göran Lagerberg, Danne Larsson, Anders Töpel and Freddie Skantze. "Guess Who" can be considered an early expression of Freakbeat. On the album, Larsson takes up more instruments than his usual guitar; he plays piano and various other keyboard instruments.

One single preceded the album, which was "In My Dreams". Recorded on 14 June 1966, it was Tages most successful release ever, reaching number one on both Tio i Topp and Kvällstoppen. It became Tages one and only single to achieve this feat. "In My Dreams" heavily features bongo drums and flutes throughout, in an apparent attempt to experiment with their sound. The second single "Crazy 'Bout My Baby" was worked on by the band in May–June. Released three months after the album, it became their biggest flop yet, as it did not reach Tio i Topp, and was the first release by them not to chart in the top ten on Kvällstoppen, only reaching number 16. The final single was released almost a year later, and was the cover "Dancing In The Street.", which failed to chart on either list.

=== Vocals and album cover ===
The album is diverse in its vocal duties, with drummer Tausis singing lead on his tracks, something Skantze had previously only done on Tages closing track "Stand by Me", a vocal he shared with Tommy Blom. Göran Lagerberg sings an overwhelming majority of the album's twelve tracks, similar to their debut album. Danne Larsson sings on "I Still Remember" and "Go" while Anders Töpel sings lead on "I Got You (I Feel Good) and "Dirty Mind". The album cover depicts the band in front of a pitch-black background. No text is visible except the Platina logo in the top left corner along with a huge number "2" which takes up a majority of the right portion of the album cover. Interestingly, Tausis is not represented in any of the album covers, front and back. Instead, he is only mentioned in the liner notes.

== Track listing ==
All tracks written by Tommy Blom, Göran Lagerberg, Danne Larsson, Anders Töpel and Freddie Skantze unless noted. Track lengths adapted from original 1966 LP release.

Side one

1. "Dancing in the Street" (William Stevenson, Marvin Gaye, Ivy Jo Hunter) – 2:35
2. "I Still Remember" – 2:20
3. "Guess Who" – 3:00
4. "Get Out of My Life, Woman" (Allen Toussaint) – 2:40
5. "Jealous Girl" (Gordon Mills, Brian Weske) – 3:00
6. "In My Dreams" (Blom, Lagerberg, Larsson, Töpel) – 2:00

Side one

1. "Crazy 'Bout My Baby" (Robert Mosely) – 3:05
2. "I Got You (I Feel Good)" (James Brown) – 2:45
3. "Dirty Mind" – 2:35
4. "Those Rumours" – 2:10
5. "Leaving Here" (Holland–Dozier–Holland) – 2:00
6. "Go" – 2:00

== Personnel ==
According to band biographer Kjell Wiremark, unless otherwise noted.

Tages

- Göran Lagerberg – lead vocals ("Guess Who", "Get Out of My Life, Woman", "Those Rumours, "Go"), co-lead vocals ("Dancing in the Street", "Jealous Girl", "Dirty Mind"), bass guitar; producer
- Tommy Blom – lead vocals ("In My Dreams", "I Got You (I Feel Good)" and "Leaving Here"), harmonica, percussion
- Danne Larsson – lead vocals ("I Still Remember"), backing vocals ("I Got You (I Feel Good)", "Those Rumours", "Go"), rhythm guitar, organ ("Dancing in the Street", "Get out of My Life, Woman", "Crazy 'Bout My Baby", "I Got You (I Feel Good)"), piano ("I Still Remember", "Dirty Mind"), spinet ("Go"); producer
- Anders Töpel – co-lead vocals ("Dirty Mind"), backing vocals ("I Got You (I Feel Good)", "Those Rumours"), lead guitar; producer
- Freddie Skantze – drums ("Guess Who", "I Got You (I Feel Good)", "Dirty Mind", "Those Rumours", "Leaving Here"), bongo drums ("In My Dreams", "Go"); producer
- Tommy Tausis – co-lead vocals ("Dancing in the Street", "Jealous Girl", "Crazy 'Bout My Baby"), backing vocals ("Go"), drums ("Dancing in the Street", "I Still Remember", "Get out of My Life, Woman", "Jealous Girl", "Crazy 'Bout My Baby"); producer

Other personnel

- Lasse Samuelsson's Orchestra – woodwind instruments ("In My Dreams")
- Anders Henriksson – producer
- Björn Almstedt – studio engineer
- Ulf H. Holmstedt – cover photography
- Hans Sidén – artwork, liner notes

== Singles ==
Year	Song	B-side	Chart positions	
Year	Song	B-side	Kvällstoppen	Tio i Topp
1966	"In My Dreams"	"Leaving Here"	1	1
1966	"Crazy 'Bout My Baby"	"Go"	16	—
1967	"Dancing in the Street"	"Those Rumours"	—	—
