= Miss Mac Baren =

Single by Tages
- B-side: "Get Up An' Get Goin'"
- Released: 28 November 1966
- Recorded: 22 November 1966
- Studio: Europafilm Studios, Stockholm
- Genre: Pop
- Length: 2:20
- Label: Platina
- Songwriters: Göran Lagerberg; Anders Töpel; Tommy Tausis; Danne Larsson; Tommy Blom
- Producer: Anders Henriksson

Tages singles chronology
| "Crazy 'Bout My Baby" (1966) | "Miss Mac Baren" (1966) | "Secret Room" (1967) |

"Miss Mac Baren" is a song by the Swedish rock band Tages, released as a single in November 1966. It was written by all five members of the group and was recorded during the sessions for their third studio album, Extra Extra, but was ultimately excluded from it. The B-side, "Get Up An' Get Goin'", was however included as the fourth track on the album. "Miss Mac Baren" got its first album release on Tages Hits Vol. 3, a compilation album released in August 1967.

== Background ==
The song originated during the band's Scandinavian tour. After a show in Odense, Denmark, they were phoned by their record label, Platina Records, and told that they needed a title for their next single so that they could have the sleeve printed. The band was unsure of what to record until they were sitting at a bar and guitarist Danne Larsson spotted an ad for Mac Baren Tobacco, which inspired the title.

The band subsequently wrote the rest of the song on a tour bus in Southern Sweden during their way home from Denmark. According to vocalist Tommy Blom, it was partly inspired by a currently unidentified Finnish rock group which Tages had heard the previous year during a tour. Once they returned to Stockholm, they recorded the song in Europafilm Studio in Solna on 22 November 1966. The unusual sound used at the beginning and end of the song was conceived by Blom, who crawled inside a grand piano and played it with a pick.

"Miss Mac Baren" was released as a single on 28 November 1966, a release that coincided with their third studio album Extra Extra. It instantly became a chart hit, reaching number one on Kvällstoppen in the early weeks of 1967 (becoming their second to do so, after "In My Dreams"), and number four on Tio i Topp. The B-Side, "Get Up An' Get Goin'", was written by Anders Henriksson and Thorstein Bergmanunder under the pseudonyms F. Akon and F. Thokon.

== Personnel ==
=== Tages ===
- Tommy Blom – co-lead vocals, percussion
- Göran Lagerberg – co-lead vocals, bass guitar
- Anders Töpel – lead guitar
- Danne Larsson – rhythm guitar, backing vocals
- Tommy Tausis – drums

=== Other ===
- Anders Henriksson – piano, keyboards, backing vocals, producer

== Chart positions ==
| Chart (1966–1967) | Peak position |
|---|---|
| Sweden (Kvällstoppen) | 1 |
| Sverige (Tio i Topp) | 4 |
