= Göran Lagerberg =

Swedish musician

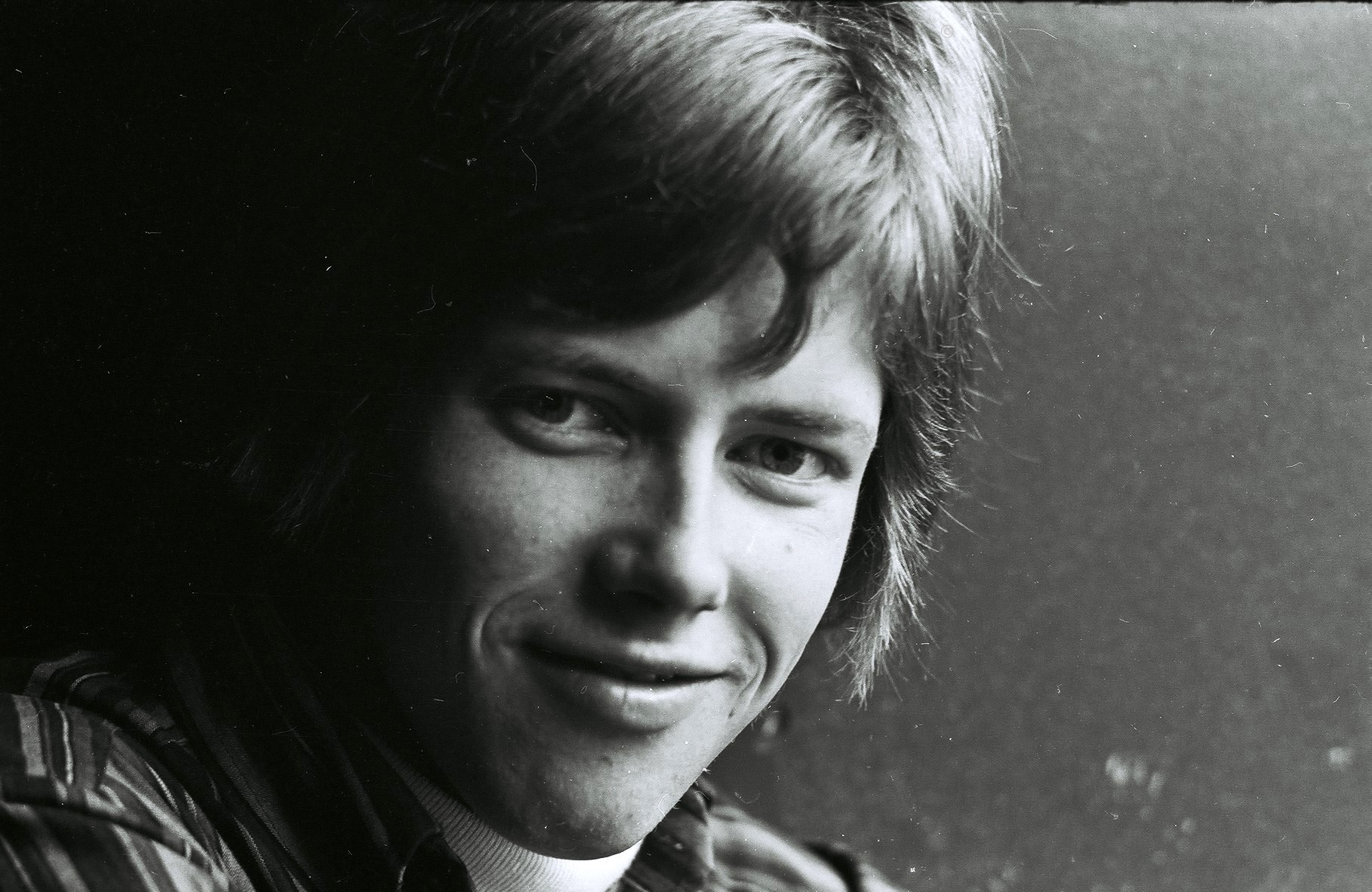
- Lagerberg in 1967

Background information
- Born: Göran Bertil Lagerberg; 20 September 1947 (age 78); Gothenburg, Sweden
- Genres: Rock; pop
- Occupation: Musician
- Instruments: Bass guitar; vocals
- Years active: 1964–present
- Label: Various (no solo-releases)

Göran Bertil Lagerberg (Swedish pronunciation: [ˈjœ̂ːran bærtɪɭ lɑːgɛrbɛrj']; born 20 September 1947) is a Swedish musician and singer-songwriter, best known as the bass guitarist and co-lead vocalist in Swedish rock band Tages and later progressive rock act Kebnekajse. In the 1990s, he was a member of supergroup Grymlings together with Magnus Lindberg, Pugh Rogefeldt and Mikael Rickfors.

Lagerberg initially joined Tages in 1963 when they were named Alberts Skiffelgrupp and played washboard. The group quickly abandoned their skiffle roots in favour of beat music, with Lagerberg picking up bass guitar. Upon becoming a professional band in 1964, Lagerberg competed with lead singer Tommy Blom as the group's de facto leader. (Note: Their official kapellmeister was drummer Freddie Skantze.) Starting in 1966, he composed a huge output of the group's music, penning most original songs they recorded. Lagerberg was the group's only consistent member and stayed with them until 1970 when they had changed their name to Blond. The group has repeatedly been cited as one of the best Swedish groups of the 1960s due to their later work including the studio album Studio (1967).

After a brief stint as a session musician, Lagerberg joined progressive rock band Kebnekajse, playing on two of the group's studio albums, Kebnekajse II and Kebnekajse III, but did not write songs for these. He left in 1975 for further studies. In 1990, Lagerberg co-founded Grymlings, who became both commercially and critically popular in Sweden. All three of their albums reached the top-twenty on Sverigetopplistan. He has also collaborated with several other Swedish artists, including Fläsket brinner, Egba, Feta Heta linjen and has participated in several re-unions of Tages.

== Early life ==
Göran Bertil Lagerberg was born on 20 September 1947 in the Swedish city of Gothenburg to parents Bertil Lagerberg Svensson (1916–1990) and Maud Lindell (1915–1998). As a kid, he was interested into music and started attending piano lessons at the age of six, attending the same school as Danne Larsson. He quickly took up playing guitar on the side, which he found much more interesting than the piano. During the late 1950s, the skiffle craze was storming through Europe, particularly Sweden, and affected many young people, including Lagerberg, who began playing the washboard". This eventually led him to get invited to his first band, Limmericks, where he assumed that role. Following his stint in that band, he began playing guitar with a group called the Sharks who was quickly noticed by future members of Tages. He did this while still in school, attending the Gothenburg Läroverk. His work with the group would be postponed until he graduated in June 1965.

== Music career ==
=== Tages ===
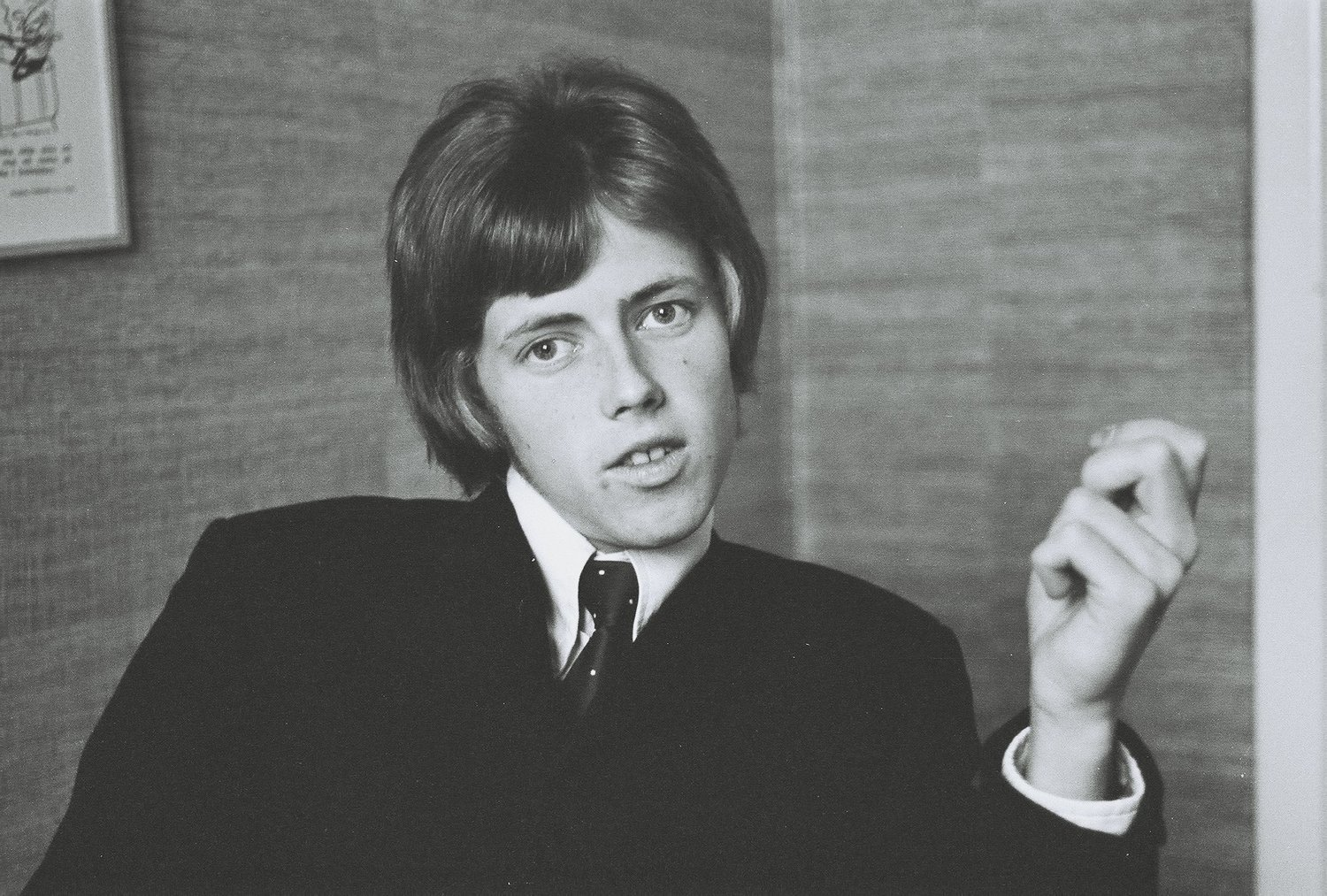
Lagerberg in 1966

Lagerberg was only invited to Tages, then named Albert's Skiffelgrupp, because according to Larsson "he was the only guy insane enough to play the washboard." The group then consisted of Larsson, Tommy Blom and Anders Töpel. He was invited during the summer of 1963 the year he would turn 16. His middle name, Bertil, was initially considered to becomes the band name, but this idea was ultimately rejected once Larsson's middle name Tage was chosen instead. Lagerberg would continue playing washboard with the group until his parents bought him a bass guitar as a Christmas present in December of that year. The other members followed suite, purchasing electric guitars. After recruiting drummer Freddie Skantze during that month, the group set out to become a beat group.

Unlike many other Swedish groups, who only had one lead singer, the members of Tages were each allowed to lead the vocals at least once per one show, often harmonizing. Lagerberg was often chosen as the lead singer on multiple songs as his voice was considered quite good. Much of Tages stage repertoire came from Lagerberg, who was passionate about both rhythm and blues and soul music, and as a result, he would scover records stores and find material by Muddy Waters, Wilson Pickett, John Lee Hooker and Otis Redding. During the Västkustens Beatles (West Coast Beatles) contest, Lagerberg sang most of the songs as Blom wasn't present. They won the contest and as a result became idols in Sweden overnight.

Lagerberg had also turned to songwriting at around this point as well. His first published song with Tages was "Tell Me You're Mine", co-written with Töpel. It was released as the B-side of their debut single "Sleep Little Girl" in October 1964 and was also the first time Lagerberg's voice was committed to tape. The group's two following singles "I Should Be Glad" and "Don't Turn Your Back" were also penned by Lagerberg, with Larsson and Töpel as co-writers respectively. Lagerberg also harmonized on both songs together with the respective co-writers, which at the time was his primary role in the group. His first solo vocal was a rendition of "Dimples" released on their debut album Tages in November 1965.

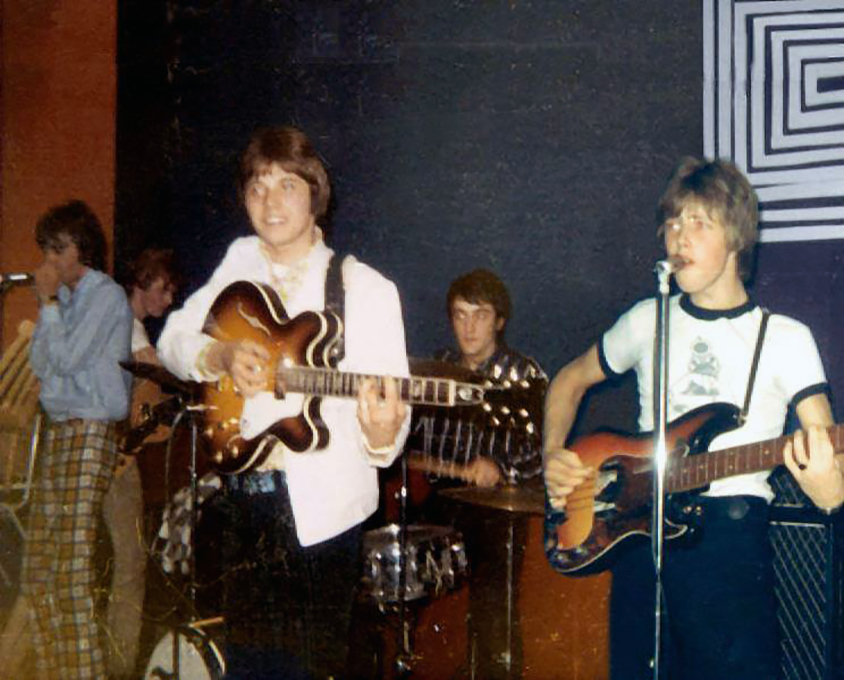
Lagerberg (right) performing with Tages in 1966

On 19 January 1966, Tages entered Europafilm Studios to record two Lagerberg compositions; "The Man You'll Be Looking For" and "So Many Girls". The first of which, a high tempo rock song, would eventually find its way to a flexi disc. This was in Lennart Wrigholm's eyes the first time a good composition could be used on a flexi disc, thanks to Lagerberg's talent. "So Many Girls" on the other hand a slower, ballad-like song which greatly contrasted from their previous material. It was released as a single in February and nonetheless received a respectable number five on Kvällstoppen and four on Tio i Topp. This was the first time Blom's de facto leadership of the group was questioned and the first time the group actually tried branching away from contemporary rock and roll, thanks to Lagerberg.

Lagerberg also greatly contributed to the group's studio albums at the time. In August their second album Tages 2 was released. It saw Lagerberg's role in the band further expand, as he sang lead or co-lead vocals on eight of the twelve tracks present. He also greatly contributed to the material found on the album. In November, Tages third studio album Extra Extra was released. This saw Lagerberg further expand his creative influence over the band, reflected with baroque pop on tracks such as "Gone Too Far", one of two of his compositions found on the album. His voice can further be heard on six different tracks on the album.

In 1967, following signing to Parlophone records, the group was allotted more studio time and as a results their music became more lax. Together with Blom, Lagerberg composed "Every Raindrop Means Alot", which he also sang the chorus of. Following "Every Raindrop Means Alot", no more singles would be sung by Blom, instead that role was substituted by Lagerberg. He led the group into psychedelia for their next album Contrast in April 1967. Following that release, Lagerberg became obsessed with Swedish folk music and as such, adapted elements into their fifth album, simply titled Studio. According to Wrigholm, Studio is an early "Swedish masterpiece" and the closest thing Sweden has to Sgt. Pepper's Lonely Hearts Club Band. However, not everybody was keen on these ideas. Blom, who was disillusioned by his reducing popularity and place in the group owing to Lagerberg left in August 1968, reducing them to a quartet.

=== Blond ===
The quartet (consisting of Lagerberg, Larsson, Töpel and drummer Lasse Svensson) nonetheless carried on without Tommy Blom, performing as Tages for the remainder of 1968. With Blom out of the band, they decided to attempt reaching commercial success abroad, with Lagerberg in the lead. For this, the group developed a much more vocal stage-set, similar to that of the Move. This diminished Lagerberg's role as a singer substantially, as all three final Tages singles had been sung by him solo. Nonetheless, the group carried on as Tages, allowing their contract with Parlophone to expire, upon which they signed with manager Richard Reese-Edwards, who had previously worked with the Hep Stars. He managed to get them a contract with Fontana Records.

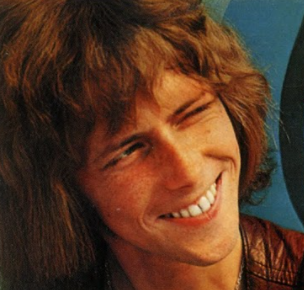
Lagerberg in 1969

The $50,000 advance (equivalent to $372,707 in 2021) by Fontana only had three requirements; one album, two singles and a name change which would work internationally. In May 1969, the name Blond was suggested, due to the association of the hair colour with the country of Sweden. The band had already previously in March of that year went to London to record their sixth album. Together with Anders Henriksson, who had recorded with Tages since 1965, the group recorded twelve songs during their visit to London. Nine out of these tracks were co-written by Lagerberg, who also assumed lead vocal duty on every track recorded during these sessions. The album was issued during the autumn of 1969 as The Lilac Years, and could be considered to be Lagerberg's magnum opus.

Shortly before the release of the album however, both Larsson and Töpel left the group, due to the conscription the country had. The group nonetheless carried on without the members, instead substituting them with rhythm guitarist Anders Nordh and lead guitarist Björn Lindér. These two were featured on the album cover once The Lilac Years was issued in the US in November 1969, under the name Blond. That same month however, Nordh left and was replaced by Anders Töpel's brother Björn along with keyboardist Mats Landahl. The following month the group debuted on scene as a quintet but these performances led to nowhere, and the group toured West Germany the following year. After this went nowhere however, the group members called it quits, and in August 1970, they played their final gig together.

=== 1970s and 1980s ===
Lagerberg was the only former member of Tages to continue working as a musician, as the other quit in favor for blue- or white-collar jobs. Following the dissolution of Blond, Lagerberg suffered from writer's block for a while after the Blond single "I Wake Up And Call" received negative reviews in the press. Instead, he became a session bassist. During his tenure as one, he played on several recordings, including Claes af Geijerstam's Out of My Hair and Lalla Hansson's Upp Till Ragvaldsträsk, which became critically acclaimed in the Swedish media. He also worked with a studio group called Jason's Fleece together with ABBA session musicians Janne Schaffer and Ola Brunkert. This produced an LP along with two singles.

I wanted to develop my bass playing, and in Heta Linjen I got the chance to do something new. It was so fucking fun and it was new all the time.

— Göran Lagerberg, 2008

Following the recording of Doris Svensson's Did You Give The World Some Love Today Baby, in 1971 Berndt Egerbladh invited Lagerberg to jam with the backing group, consisting of Egerbladh, Janne Carlsson, Bengt Karlsson, Berndt Egerbladh, Ulf Andersson and Olle Holmquist. Lagerberg accepted, as he wanted to further develop his bass playing. This group became known as Feta Heta Linjen, alternatively Feta Heta Linjens Supershow. The group put out one album in 1971, Med Kisa, Brass & Brudar which features one composition by Lagerberg, titled "Mama".

Shortly thereafter, Lagerberg turned back to Swedish folk rock, and joined Kebnekajse as a bassist. The group came out of the Mecki Mark Men and initially had a progressive rock sound. However, leader Kenny Håkansson called and asked him to join, upon which Lagerberg soon showed his influence on the band by incorporating more Swedish themes into the music, and made his record debut with the group on Kebnekajse II. In 2013, Sonic Magazine voted the album to be 74th best Swedish album of all time. Unlike his previous groups, Lagerberg did not write songs while in Kebnekajse. He stayed for one more album, Kebnekajse III and left shortly thereafter, but did find his time with the group to be extremely interesting.

According to Lagerberg, he left Kebnekajse to join Egba (short for Electronic Groove and Beat Academy), who were relatively big on the Swedish progressive rock scene. Led by Ulf Adåker, Lagerberg made his studio debut with the group on the album Jungle Jam and with this his bass playing became fundamental for the group's sound. Egba became the only group (excluding Tages) that Lagerberg became a permanent member for more than four years, playing on their albums Amigos Latinos (1978), Bryter Upp! (1979) but did not write for these albums. Fed up with the constant touring for the past 17 years, Lagerberg decided to quit Egba in 1981, playing on roughly half of their album Omen (1984) He was replaced by Bruno Råberg. He settled down and started playing theatre music at Pistolteatern at Mälartorget in Gamla stan, Stockholm. During the 1980s, he primarily composed film music to Swedish movies, most notably S/Y Joy (1989)

=== Grymlings ===
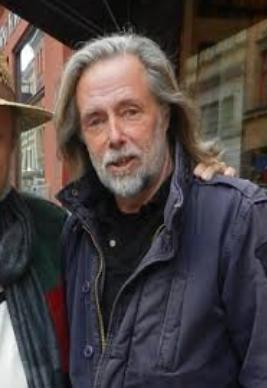
Lagerberg in 2014

In 1990, Lagerberg formed Swedish superground Grymlings together with Mikael Rickfors (previous lead vocalist in the Hollies between 1971 and 1973) on guitar, keyboards and vocals, Magnus Lindberg on harmonica and vocals and Pugh Rogefeldt on guitar and vocals. The name came from a farm in Eksta on southern Gotland, which Rickfors owned starting in the late 1980s. Rickfors invited the members to the farm for the first time in August 1990 just "for fun and meeting family", estimating there to be roughly 40–50 people present. The idea to record together came as the farm was used as a professional home studio by Rickfors, upon the other members thought it would be fun to also record music at it.

Their eponymous debut album was recorded at Grymlings Studio and released in 1990 through Warner Music Group. It reached number three on the Swedish Albums Chart during that year, a position it would hold for two weeks. It sold an estimated 170,000 copies in Sweden alone, Rogefeldt's "Mitt bästa för dig" was released from the album as a single and managed to chart on Svensktoppen, staying at number one for 14 weeks between 1990 and 1991. It was so positively reviewed that Kent Finell in 1992 chose it as "one of the 50 best Svensktopp-songs of all time". Rickfors and Rogefeldt's "Där gullvivan blommar" was also a chart hit, reaching number two on Svensktoppen in 1991 and 1992.

The group's second album Grymlings II was released in 1992, and also became a chart success, reaching number 11 in the albums chart. Two singles were extracted from the album; "En glädjesång" and "Väntar på en vän", peaking at number nine and five respectively on Svensktoppen in 1992 and 1993. Grymlings II featured the first song Lagerberg wrote together with the band, "Lysa" ("Shine") Shortly after the album was released, the band broke up following a shorter tour of the country.

In 2004, the group reunited, albeit without Rogefeldt, who was replaced by Mats Ronander. The reason Rogefeldt left was that "he was too occupied to participate", however, he himself disputed this a few years later, stating "ten years later the boys wanted to do a revival and we had a meeting. But I felt we could not repeat it in a dignified way, so I said: 'Sorry guys, I'm not in'". Nonetheless, the reunion produced one album, Grymlings III, released in 2005, it spawned three singles, including "Det är något särskilt med dig" along with one by Lagerberg with lyrics by Peter LeMarc, "Där går min älskling". It failed to chart, but Rickfors composition "Moder Svea" managed to enter Svensktoppen, peaking at number seven in May of that year.

The album garnered almost universal negative reception, after which the band broke up without reuniting again. Lindberg died on 26 February 2019.

== Later and personal life ==
After his brief stint playing studio music, Lagerberg studied at Komvux for three years before once again returning to music. With the money he earned during his time in Grymlings, Lagerberg bought a personal computer, taking lessons on it before becoming an information systems technician, which he worked with for many years. He was employed by Scandinavian Airlines as a network administrator in the 1990s, before the reunion with Grymlings. Following his time in Grymlings, Lagerberg briefly fronted an eponymous band in which he played songs from the Tages and Blond eras, sometimes with the inclusion of both Anders Henriksson and Björn Lindér.

Lagerberg has stated that he prefers to write lyrics in English, as it "is the language of rock and roll, but has written songs in Swedish, most notably for Grymlings. One of his earlier Swedish compositions was named "Balladen om killen" ("Ballad about the guy") which he wrote to Örjan Ramberg in 1969, while still in Blond. He also sang on part one of the recording, which due to length was split into two sections, with Ramberg taking the lead on part two. Despite his massive works in various groups and as a studio musician, Lagerberg has not yet (2021) released a solo album.

Lagerberg has become known as one of the best Swedish vocalists of the 1960s and dominated Tages vocal output for most of their career. Vocally, Lagerberg tended to emulate several of his heroes, including Otis Redding, Wilson Pickett and Sam & Dave. He is an enjoyer of soul music. Lagerberg has cited Stanley Clarke, Paul Jackson, Jaco Pastorius, Paul McCartney and John Entwistle as primary inspiration for his bass playing.

== Sources ==
- Brandels, Göran; Wrigholm, Lennart (2012). Boken om Tages: från Avenyn till Abbey Road. Premium Publishing. ISBN 978-91-89136-88-5.
- Englund, Magnus (Summer 1988). "An interview with Tommy Blom". Ugly Things (7). Archived from the original on 5 June 2020.
- Wrigholm, Lennart (1991). "Tages: Makalös grej i Götet…". Now & then.
