= Zorn Badge =

Swedish folk music award

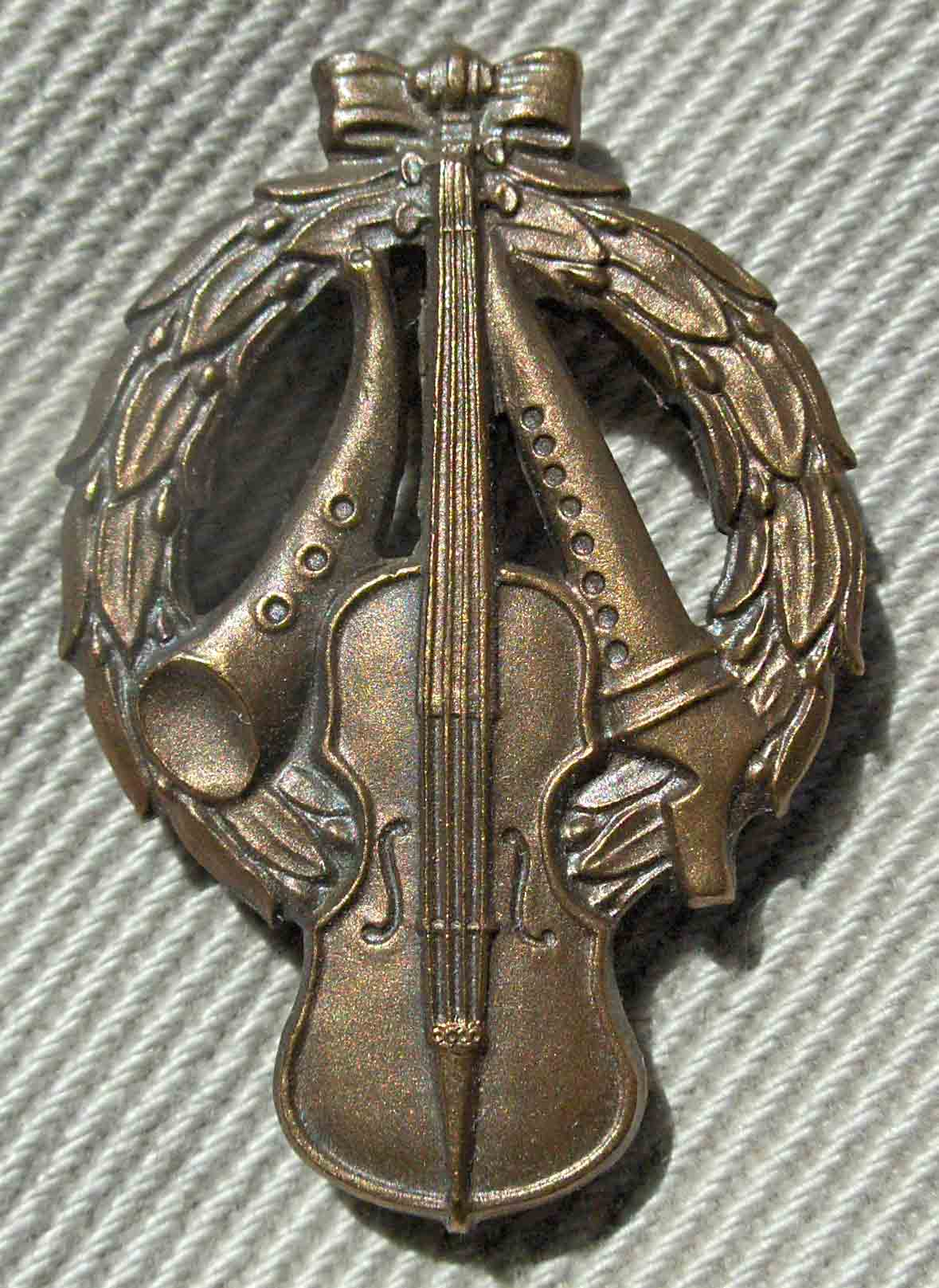
The Bronze Zorn Badge

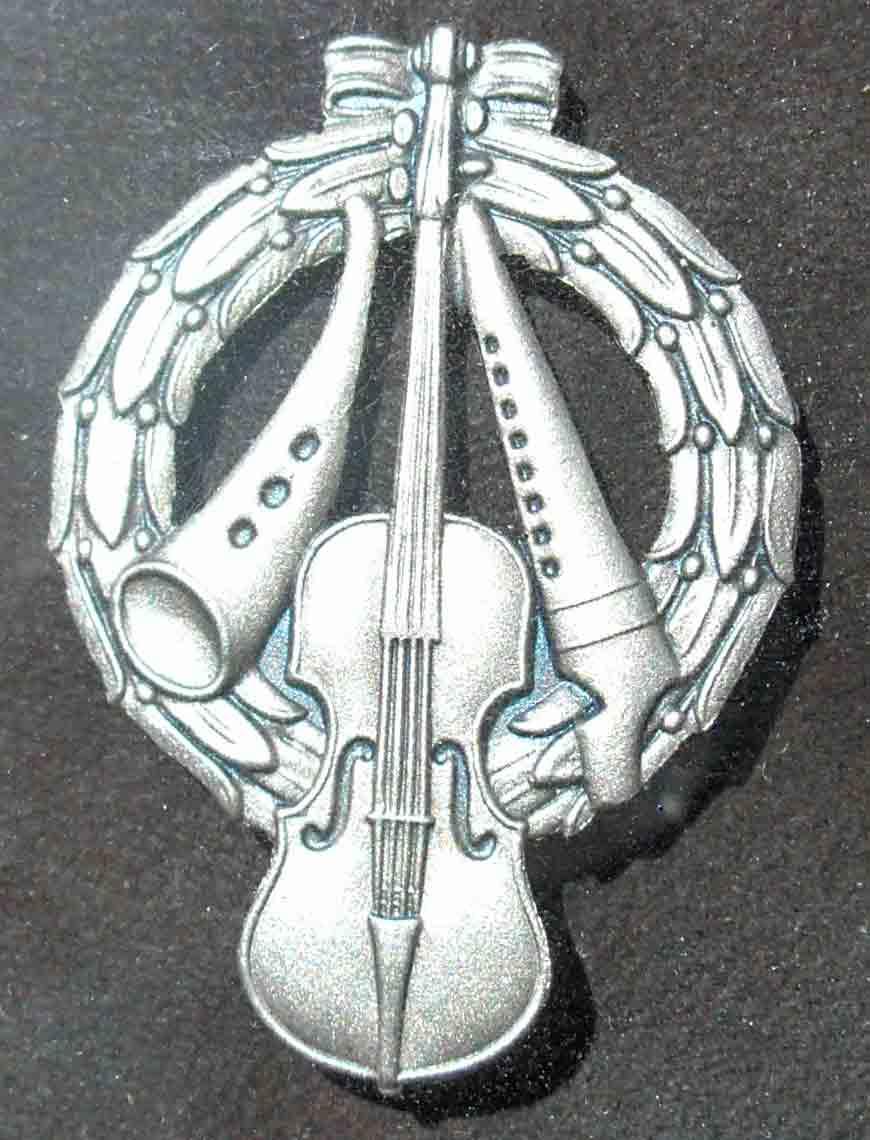
The Silver Zorn Badge

The Zorn Badge (Swedish: Zornmärket) is an award that is given to prominent folk musicians in Sweden. The prize is awarded by Svenska Folkdansringen, the Swedish national organization for traditional music, dance and handicraft.

== History ==
In 1910, the first national gathering of spelmän (performers of traditional folk music) took place at Skansen in Stockholm. For this occasion, the artist Anders Zorn, who was interested in the revival of traditional folk culture, designed and financed a silver badge for distribution to all the participating spelmän. In the early 1930s, Svenska Folkdansringen received the rights to the badge from Zorn's widow Emma. They put together a jury for a new National Folk Musicians' Gathering in Västerås in 1933, before whom spelmän could test their mettle. The Jury would grant a number of different awards to those spelmän, the highest of which would be Anders Zorn's silver badge.

== The award ==
The Zorn Badge has three levels: bronze, silver and gold. The bronze and silver badges are awarded after trials, which take place at regional folk musicians' gatherings where a jury from Svenska Folkdansringen is present. A musician who wishes to try for the Zorn Badge must be 16 years of age, and must perform three to five different pieces of folk music.

The gold badge is awarded to one or two master musicians each year. There are no trials for this level, which is awarded to extremely prominent musicians and tradition bearers.

A musician who receives the silver or gold badge is entitled to call himself or herself Riksspelman (often translated as "Musician of the Realm" or "National Folk Musician"). Sweden had approximately 300 living Riksspelmän in 2009.

== Swedish folk music artists with Riksspelman status that have received golden Zorn Badge distinctions ==
Year	Winner	Justification	Silver
2025	Bernt Lindström, Lingbo	”For masterful, tradition-rooted and expressive horn playing.”	1999
2024	Siw Burman, Lycksele	"For traditional, resonant, and brilliant performance of tunes from Västerbotten."	2011
2024	Simon Simonsson, Alfta	"For expressive, genuine, and personal performance of traditional tunes."	1976
2023	Britt Forsströmsson, Malmö	"For masterful and inspiring performance of tunes from Blekinge."	1980
2023	Anders Svensson (musician), Älmhult	"For brilliant, lively, and personal performance of tunes from Småland."	1989
2022	Alm Nils Ersson, Siljansnäs	"Due to masterful interpretation and traditional performance of tunes from the Leksand region."	1961
2021	Rickard Näslin, Rödön	"Due to masterful, graceful and traditional performance of tunes from Jämtland"	1978
2021	Kjell-Erik Eriksson, Frösön	"Due to masterful, intimate and traditional performance of tunes from Jämtland"	2015
2019	Mats Edén, Eslöv	"Due to exceptionally skillful, graceful and intimate performance of Värmland tunes on violin and melodeon"	1979
2018	Anders Henriksson, Järvsö	"Due to masterful, graceful and traditional performance of tunes from Hälsingland"	1979
2017	Bo Larsson, Björklinge	"Due to masterful musicianship and traditional performance of tunes from Upland"	1969
2017	Carina Normansson, Sala	"Due to masterful and graceful performance of tunes from Västmanland"	1979
2016	Leif Göras, Rättvik	"Due to masterful, genuine and traditional performance of tunes from Rättvik"	-
2016	Anders Jakobsson, Orsa	"Due to masterful, brilliant and traditional performance of tunes from Orsa"	1970
2015	Eva Blomquist-Bjärnborg, Alvesta	"Due to brilliant performance of tunes from Småland according to traditions"	1981
2015	Magnus Gustafsson, Värends Nöbbele	"Due to traditional and rhythmically dynamic performance of tunes from Småland"	1987
2014	Torbjörn Näsbom, Umeå	"Due to virtuoso, masterful violin and nyckelharpa performance according to tradition"	-
2013	Nisse Nordström, Upplands Väsby	"Due to authentic and rhythmically dynamic performance of tunes from Upland"	1974
2013	Olov Johansson, Dalby, Uppsala	"Due to masterful and performance of Upland tunes according to tradition"	1984
2012	Erik Pekkari, Värna, Åtvidaberg	"Due to masterful, brilliant performance of diatonic melodeon according to tradition"	1994
2011	Svante Lindqvist, Luleå	"Due to masterful, graceful and intimate performance of tunes from Norrbotten"	1977
2010	Sonia Sahlström, Uppsala	"Due to masterful and traditional performance of tunes from Upland"	1979
2010	Peter Hedlund, Vallsta	"Due to masterful, brilliant nyckelharpa performance according to tradition"	1975
2009	Alf Olsson, Säffle	"Due to masterful, brilliant and traditional performance of tunes from Svanskog"	1984
2009	Per-Olof Moll, Karlstad	"Due to masterful, authentic and according to tradition performance of tunes from Särna"	1981
2008	Ulf Störling, Insjön	"Due to masterful and traditional performance of tunes from southern Hälsingland"	-
2007	Karin Wallin, Helsingborg	"Due to masterful, dynamic and intimate performance of tunes from Scania"	1993
2006	Per Gudmundson, Falun	"Due to masterful and graceful performance in the fair tradition on the violin, as well as brilliant bagpipe performance according to tradition"	1973
2006	Kungs Levi Nilsson, Siljansnäs	"Due to masterful traditional performance of tunes from Leksand"	1965
2005	Tony Wrethling, Sandviken	"Due to masterful and according to tradition performance of tunes from Gästrikland"	1976
2004	O'tôrgs-Kaisa Abrahamsson, Bergsjö	"Due to masterful and inteimate performance of tunes according to the tradition of Hälsinge"	1978
2003	Mats Andersson, Vaksala	"Due to masterful and traditional clarinet performance"	1973
2002	Erik Englund, Bispgården	"Due to solid and traditional performance of tunes from Jämtland"	1962
2002	Marie (numera Martin) Stensby, Hammerdal	"Due to brilliant and graceful performance of tunes from Bohuslän"	1975
2001	Anders Liljefors, Storvreta	"Due to masterful and graceful violin performance of tunes from Upland"	1988
2000	Einar Hansander, Vänersborg	"Due to masterful performance of tunes from Dalsland according to tradition"	1977
1999	Sören Johansson, Dorotea	"Due to full-voiced and stylistic performance of tunes from southern Lapland"	1983
1998	Thore Härdelin (d.y.), Delsbo	"Due to traditional and spirited performance of tunes from Hälsinge"	1967
1997	Styrbjörn Bergelt, Stockholm	"Due to masterful and role-model stråkharpa, silverbasharpa, nyckelharpa and folk flute performance of tunes"	1983
1997	Sture Sahlström, Tobo	"Due to masterful and traditional performance of tunes from Upland"	1954
1996	Kalle Almlöf, Malung	"Due to masterful and intimate performance according to traditions from Västerdal"	1972
1995	Ole Hjorth, Stockholm	"Due to performance tunes according to Hjort Ander's tradition"	-
1994	Edvard "Skogsby-Lasse" Larsson, Kall	"Due to traditional, virtuoso and masterful harmonica performance of tunes from Jämtland"	1982
1993	Pers Hans Olsson, Rättvik	"Due to masterful and expressive performance according to traditions from Rättvik"	1965
1992	Pelle Björnlert, Edsbruk	"Due to masterful performance and renewal of old Spelman traditions in Östergötland and Småland"	1974
1991	Nelly Östlund, Horndal	"Due to traditional, virtuosic and intimate performance of tunes from Hälsingland and Dalarna"	1950
1990	Axel Andersson, Nyköping	"Due to masterful and exceptionally traditional performance of tunes from Södermanland"	1945
1989	Svante Pettersson, Gotland	"Due to masterful performance and preservation of Gotland's folk music through especially extensive recorded works"	1943
1988	Anselm Hellström, Vikbolandet	"Due to traditional and masterful performance of tunes from Vikbolandet, Östergötland"	1982
1987	Kurt Tallroth, Harbonäs	"Due to masterful and traditional clarinet, violin and nyckelharpa performance of tunes from Upland"	1954
1986	Björn Ståbi, Korskrogen	"Due to masterful and performance of Swedish folk music according to tradition, especially related to cultural heritage from Orsa"	1961
1985	Evert Wernberg, Sundsvall	"Due to masterful performance of tunes strongly associated to tradition from Medelpad"	1946
1984	Hans Bryntesson, Karlstad	"Due to masterful performance of tunes from Eda according to tradition"	1972
1983	Ragnar Karlsson, Enskede	"Due to masterful violin and nyckelharpa performance of tunes according to father August Karlsson's tradition from Rosersberg, Upland"	1977
1983	Allan Carlsson, Blattnicksele	"Due to masterful and traditional violin performance of tunes from Västerbotten and very valuable leadership in the service of folk music"	1957
1982	Ceylon Wallin, Uppsala	"Due to masterful and genuine nyckelharpa performance of tunes from Roslagen"	1971
1982	Hans Börtas, Rättvik	"Due to masterful and performance of tunes from Rättvik oriented to preserve tradition"	1948
1981	Bengt Löfberg, Fagerhult	"Due to masterful violin performance as well as valuable and ground-breaking research on tunes and nyckelharpa players from Småland"	1970
1980	Helge Nilsson, Bergsjö	"Due to masterful violin performance of tunes from Hälsingland, as well as tradition-preserving research work"	1966
1980	Anton Jernberg, Österbybruk	"Due to masterful violin performance of tunes, as well as preservation of folk music from Gästrikland according to father Gustav Jernberg's tradition. Additionally folk music entrepreneurship, dance and luthier work in Österbybruk"	1943
1979	Päckos Helmer Olsson, Bingsjö	"Due masterful performance in Bingsjö of the tunes oriented towards his father's legacy, the great player Peckos Olle"	1948
1978	Anders Sparf, Rättvik	"Due to skillful performance, versatility and awareness oriented to the preservation and passing on of nyckelharpa traditions from Rättvik"	-
1978	Sven Härdelin, Delsbo	"Due to the safeguarding and preservation of nyckelharpa traditions in northern Hälsingland"	1944
1977	Artur Lundberg, Hogdal	"Due to masterful and performance of tunes according to tradition from northern Bohuslän"	1973
1976	Pers Erik Olsson, Rättvik	"Due to masterful and traditional performance of fair tunes from Rättvik"	1965
1976	Ekor Anders Andersson, Evertsberg	"Due to masterful and traditional performance of tunes from Älvdal"	-
1975	Ivar Tallroth, Uppsala	"Due to masterful violin and nyckelharpa performance according to unique August Bohlin's tradition from Upland"	1942
1974	Assar Bengtsson, Staffanstorp	"Due to virtuoso violin and träskofiol performance of authentic Scania tunes"	1964
1974	Gösta Sandström, Täby	"Due to excellent nyckelharpa performance of tunes from Upland"	1948
1973	Gustaf Päkkos, Bingsjö	"Due to masterful and traditional performance of tunes from Bingsjö"	1950
1973	Carl Gustav Färje, Älvdalen	"Due to masterful performance of the trumpet, horn och folk flute"	1948
1972	Pelle Jakobsson, Orsa	"Due to masterly lute, horn, pipa and violin performance"	1948
1972	Erik Gustavsson, Karlstad	"Due to authentic and extraordinary performance of tunes from Värmland"	1943
1971	Nils Agenmark, Stockholm	"Due to masterful and accomplished pursue of nyckelharpa tradition according to Hjort Ander's tradition"	1971
1971	Karin Edvardsson Johansson, Transtrand	"Due to masterful rendition of ancient Swedish herdingcall according to the tradition of Transstrand"	1971
1970	Elin Lisslass, Transtrand	"Due to masterful rendition of ancient Swedish herdingcall according to the tradition of Transstrand"	1970
1970	Anton Högerberg, Ånge	"Due to authentic and masterful performance of tunes from Medelpad"	1950
1969	Bertil Rydberg, Vintrosa	"Due to successful conservation of traditional tunes Småland and Närke"	1957
1967	Petters Erik Eriksson, Rättvik	"Due to authentic and traditional performance of preserved tunes from Rättvik"	1948
1967	Leonard Larsson "Viksta-Lasse", Viksta	"Due to devoted and extraordinary musicianship"	-
1966	Udd Axel Johansson, Hedemora	"Due to outstanding musicianship and fruitful contribution to the areas of regional folk music and folk dance"	1946
1965	Lars-Erik Forslin, Borgsjö	"Due to authentic performances of tunes and successful promotion of the nyckelharpa tradition"	1950
1964	Nils Löfgren, Malmö	"Due to skillful performance and successful promotion of the nyckelharpa cultural movement in Scania"	1952
1963	Carl Eric Berndt, Lund	"Due to authentic performance and conservation of tunes" Awarded in 1964	1948
1961	Olle Falk, Offerdal	"Due to the conservation of genuine traditions related to Lapp Nils"	1950
1961	Erik Moraeus, Orsa	"Due to genuine performance of tunes and successful promotion of autochthonous nyckelharpa traditions"	1946
1960	Eric Sahlström, Tobo	"Due to masterful musicianship and pioneering contribution to the revival and revitalization of nyckelharpa playing"	1946
1959	Johan Olsson, Uppsala	"For being an exceptional representative of folk music from Upland"	1942
1957	Röjås Jonas Eriksson, Boda	"Due to flawless performance characterized by deep expression with roots in folk musicianship" Awarded in 1960	1946
1957	Dyrsmeds Olof Olsson "Påhl-Olle", Rättvik	"Due to masterful performance, brioso competitive spirit and traditional folk polyphony" Awarded in 1959	1948
1956	Ewert Åhs, Blyberg		1937
1956	Ingvar Norman, Säter		1935
1956	Knis Karl Aronsson, Leksand		1942
1954	Sven E. Svensson, Uppsala	"Due to year-long activities in favor of inspiration and commitment for Swedish folk music"	-
1954	Nils Olsson, Sundsvall	"Due to documentation and good writing of new pieces following Medelpad style"	1946
1954	Olof Nordén, Arbrå	"Due to long-lasting work on folk music and valuable new compositions following Hälsinge style"	1944
1954	Carl-Allan Moberg, Uppsala	"Due to crucial folk music research"	-
1954	Ture Gudmundsson, Stockholm	"Due to preserving projects in connection documentation and dissemination of knowledge about Swedish folk music, especially that of Dalarna region"	1944
1954	Bengt Bixo, Mörsil	"Due to committed and critical work for the knowledge of Jämtland folk music"	1910
1954	Matts Arnberg, Lidingö	"Due to extensive work on the preservation and application of unique values within folk music research"	1950
1952	Carl Iderström, Frykerud		1942*
1951	Sven Axéll, Stockholm		-
1948	Gustaf Wetter, Katrineholm		1937
1948	Einar Olsson, Glanshammar		1935
1946 Sth	Göran Olsson Föllinger, Föllinge	"Due to successful work on Jämtland original music and restoration of authentic styles"	
1946 Sth	Ivar Hultström, Flodafors	"Due to one-of-a-kind work on dissemination of regional music from Södermanland"	
1946 Sth	Nils Hägg, Stockholm	"Due to year-long work on the area of general regional music"	
1946 Sth	Sven Sköld, Stockholm	"Due to crucial contribution to the promotion of folk music"	
1946 Sth	Bernhard Svensson, Hallsberg	"Due to a crucial and innovative approach to the regional music of Dalarna"	
1946 Sth	Karl Tirén, Bergvik	"Due to highly appreciated commitment to folk musik in Norrland"	
1946 Mora	Hugo Alfvén, Leksand		-
1946 Mora	Carl Gudmundsson Leksand		-
1946 Mora	Janne Romson, Mora		-
1946 Mora	Karl Sporr, Stockholm		-
1945	Petter Blomberg, Sundsvall		-
1944	Jon Erik Öst, Meselefors	"Due to meritorious work during many years regarding the area of Swedish folk music"	1910
1943	Thore Härdelin, Delsbo		-
1943	Jon Erik Hall, Hassela	"Due to long-lasting, valuable work for the commitment with Swedish folk music"	1910
1943	Anders Petter Sundin, Matfors		1910
1942	Eric Westberg, Stockholm		-
1939	Sven Kjellström, Stockholm		-
1939	Ernst Granhammar, Stockholm		1931*
1939	Olof Andersson, Stockholm		1910
1939	Valdemar Dahlgren, Arvika		1933*
1938	Pelle Schenell, Gnarp		1910
1938	August Fredin, Loftahammar		1910
1937	Dan Danielsson, Filipstad		-
1937	Filip Pärson, Falkenberg		-
1936	Axel Boberg, Lund	"Due to outstanding contribution in the area of folk music research in Scania"	-
1935	Olof Knut Ekwall, Romanäs		-
1935	Olof Tillman, Floda		1933
1935	Gössa Anders Andersson, Orsa		1933
1935	Hjort Anders Olsson, Tureberg		1910
1933	Erik Nilsson, Mattmar		1910

* Silver Badge awards to Granhammar in 1931 and Dahlgren in 1933 were done without a live performance and was decided by the board of directors at Ungdomsringen. Likewise, the silver distinction awarded to Iderström in 1942 followed the same procedure.

== See also ==
- Swedish folk music
- Bellman Prize
