= Erik Ask-Upmark =

Swedish musician

Erik Martin Andreas Ask-Upmark (born 13 May 1973) is a Swedish musician and riksspelman on the svensk säckpipa (Swedish bagpipe).

He mainly performs with the groups Svanevit, Dråm and Falsobordone in which he plays säckpipa (Swedish bagpipe) and harp, together with his wife Anna Rynefors. He also plays skalmeja and portative organ. Ask-Upmark also runs the record company Nordic Tradition, which mainly publishes recordings and productions with Swedish folk music. Together with Anna Rynefors he also runs a production company.

Ask-Upmark is the son of the author Barbro Karlén.
