= Anna-Kajsa Norman =

- Also known as: Spel-Stina or Spelstina
- Born: Anna-Kajsa Norman c. 1820; Dalarna, Sweden
- Died: 1903 Sweden
- Genres: Swedish folk music
- Occupation: spelman

Anna-Kajsa Norman (c. 1820–1903), known as Spel-Stina or Spelstina (Playing Stina), was a Swedish folk musician, a spelman (violinist), and a composer.

== Life ==
Norman was born in Dalarna and lived her adult life in Torsåker. Originally working as servant, she came to be regarded as one of the best spelmans in Gästrikland for her skill as a violinist within folk music. Female spelmans were a rarity, and she is also one of the few female spelmans which are sufficiently documented.

Norman was unmarried but lived with Erik Hellström i Berg, with whom she had five children, among them her son Anders, who wrote down her songs.

Anna-Kajsa Norman composed two collections of songs: Från Hälsingland and Från Delsbo.

== Legacy ==
In 2004, Spelstinamedaljen (The Spelstina Medal) and Spelstinastipendiet (The Spelstina Scholarship) was named after her. It is annually awarded to female folk musicians.
