= Alban Faust =

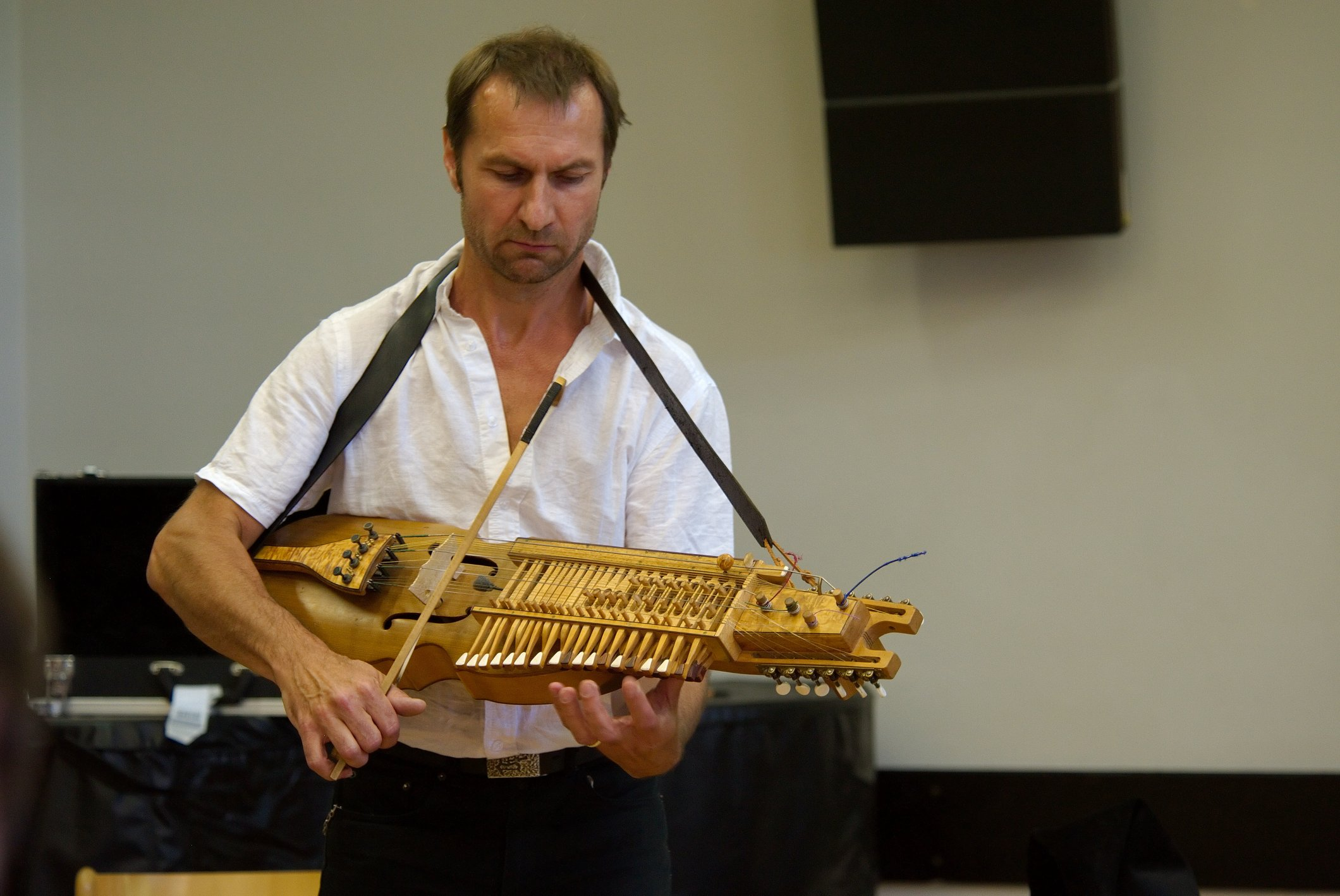
Faust playing the traditional Swedish nyckelharpa

Alban Faust is a luthier and player of traditional Swedish music, designated a Swedish Riksspelman ("musician of the realm") in 2009. Born in Germany, Faust later moved to Dalsland, Mellerud, Sweden.

Since 1990 Faust has owned his own business, "Borduninstrument Alban Faust" (Alban Faust Drone Instruments), at which he produces säckpipa (Swedish bagpipes), as well as other types of French and German bagpipes. Faust is also a musician, and chairman of the folk music organisation Dalslands Spelmansförbund.

== Appointment as Riksspelman ==
In summer, 2009, Faust played before a Swedish jury on the nyckelharpa and traditional mouthblown säckpipa, as well as demonstrating a bellows-blown säckpipa of his own invention, which he had invented to eliminate the effects of mouth-blown moisture on the pipe reeds, and allow the player to sing or speak while piping. The jury approved of his efforts, and Faust was awarded the silver Zorn Badge designating him a Riksspelman.
