= Ditlev Trappo Saugmann Bjerregaard =

Danish businessman (1852–1916)

Ditlev Trappo Saugmand Bjerregaard (1852–1916) was a Danish businessman, traditional musician and a prolific composer of traditional dance music. He had a shop in Kjellerup where he sold musical instruments and toys, and where he also taught music to local children. He began composing in 1872 and published his first tune collection in 1878. With his band he toured local dance halls and parties, as his was the only major orchestra in the area between Silkeborg and Viborg. He composed around 900 tunes which he published in 76 tune collections that he printed, sold and distributed throughout Denmark. Most of his compositions are polkas, waltzes, galops, hopsas, schottisches, and mazurkas, arranged for 3 violins, flute, clarinet, 2 trumpets, tenorbass and doublebass. Among his most famous compositions are the hopsa "Drej skruen" and several others. In 2000 a remembrance plaque was placed at his home in Kjellerup, inaugurated by the deputy mayor.

== See also ==
- Evald Thomsen
- Frederik Iversen
- Æ Tinuser

== Ekstern references ==
Saugmann Bjerregaards Fond (in Danish)
