= Leif Eriksson (pipemaker) =

Swedish cabinetmaker

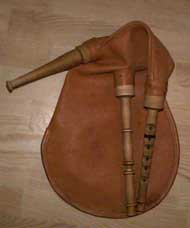
Bapipe by Leif Eriksson

Leif Eriksson (born 1946) is a Swedish cabinetmaker who, along with fiddler Per Gudmundson, developed the modern revival of the Swedish bagpipe in the 1980s. Eriksson initially only made pipes to order, but his reputation increased when he was asked to produce pipes for the Dalarnas museum (in Swedish).
