= Stundom =

Danish folk band

- Origin: Copenhagen, Denmark
- Years active: Since 2017
- Members: Emma Kragh-Elmoe; Villads Hoffmann; Julian Svejgaard
- Website: stundommusic.com

Stundom are a Danish folk band composed of Emma Kragh-Elmoe, Villads Hoffmann, and Julian Svejgaard.

== History ==
The band originated with Elmoe and Hoffmann, who performed as the duo Elmoe & Hoffmann starting in 2015. In 2017, Svejgaard joined as a pianist, and in January 2020 the band adopted its name, which is an archaic Danish word meaning "occasionally" or "now and then".

== Band members ==
- Emma Kragh-Elmoe – Violin, viola and piano
- Villads Hoffmann – Cittern, guitar, viola and music box
- Julian Svejgaard – Piano, organ, and synth

== Discography ==
=== Albums ===
- Vandkanten (2018)
- må jeg holde din hånd? ("May I hold your hand?") (2021)
- Hvis ikke de er døde, lever de endnu ("If they're not dead, they're still alive") (2024)
