= Bengan Janson =

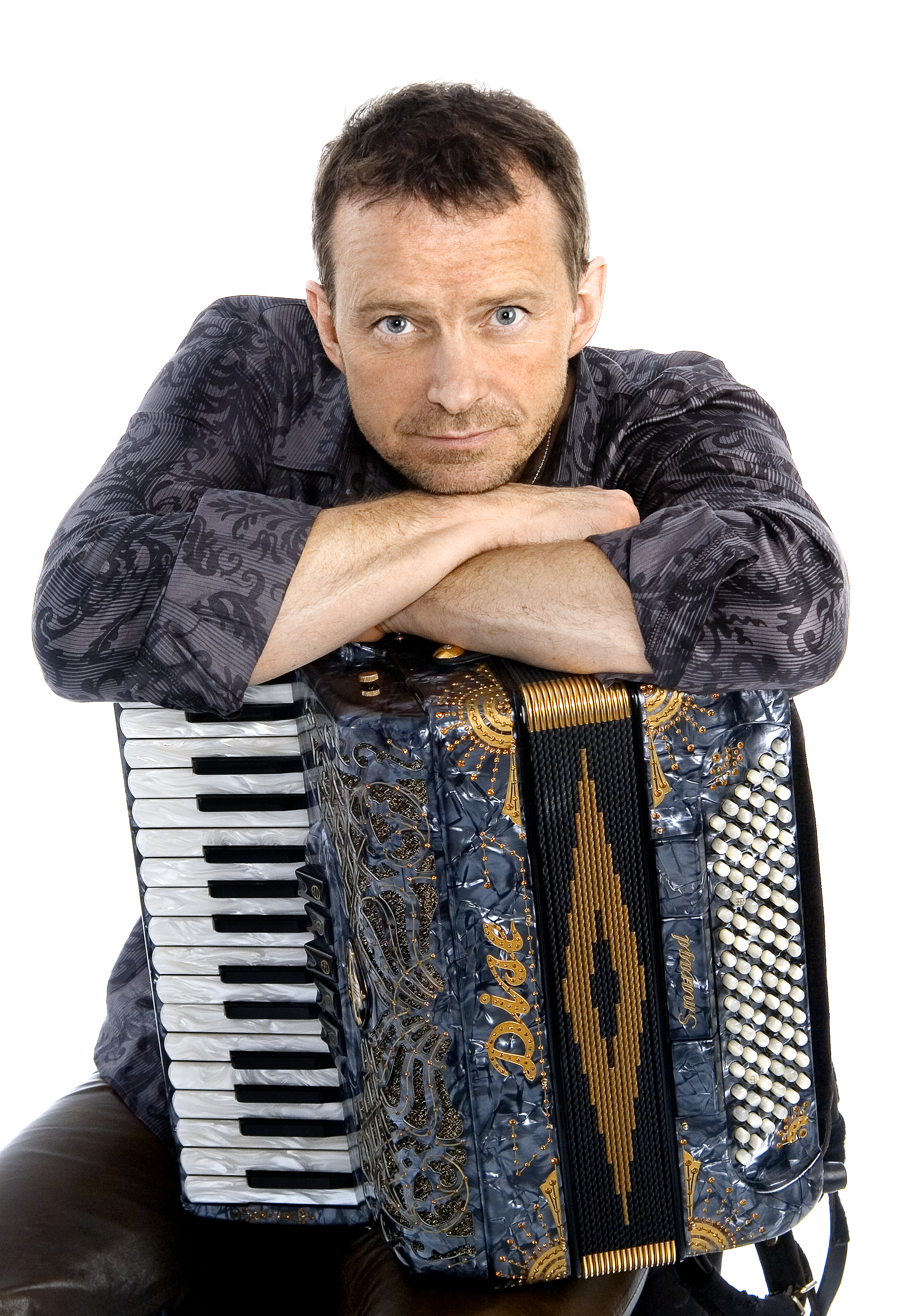
- Janson in 2008

Background information
- Born: Bengt Åke Janson; 23 February 1963 (age 62); Stockholm, Sweden
- Genres: Swedish folk; Swedish ballads; Jazz; Pop; Rock
- Occupation: musician
- Instrument: accordion

Bengt Åke "Bengan" Janson (born 23 February 1963, in Stockholm) is a Swedish accordionist. He plays Swedish folk music, Swedish ballads, pop, rock, and jazz, and has performed with artists such as Kalle Moraeus, Anne Sofie von Otter, Björn Skifs, Loa Falkman, and Allan Edwall. Moraeus and Janson form the duo Kalle & Bengan.

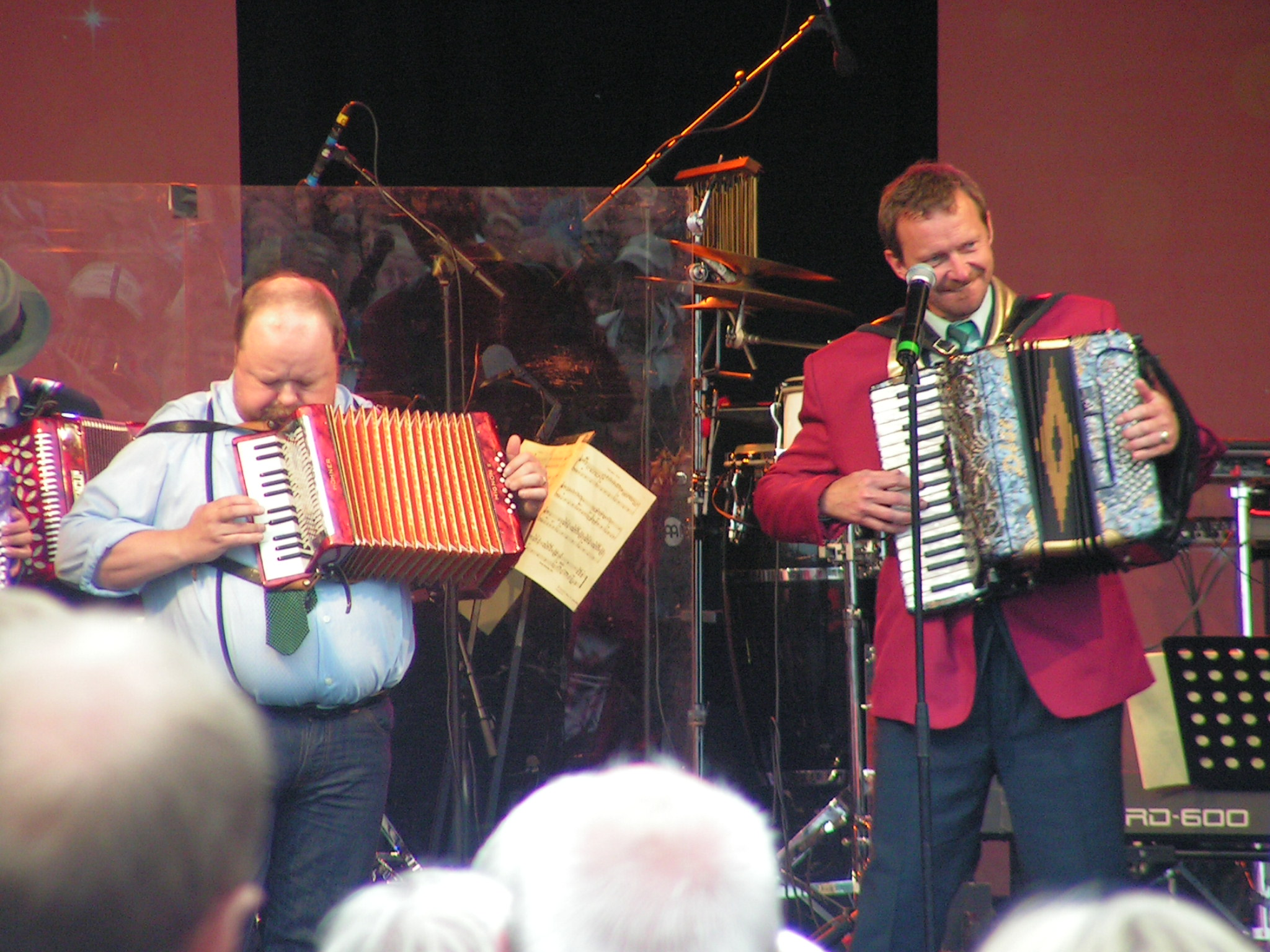
Kalle Moraeus (left) and Bengan Janson (right)

At the age of eight, Janson started to play the accordion, when his brother tired of the instrument and gave his accordion to Bengan. He moved to Järvsö with his family in 1979, and met the jazz pianist Gösta Svensson who became influential for his musical development. In the late 1980s, he was a member of the band Östen med Resten.

Janson and Per Gudmundson received the Grammis award for Folk Music of the Year in 2019, for their album Hjeltamôs.

He was the recipient of the 2020 Karamelodiktstipendiet in memory of Povel Ramel, which was not awarded until 2021 due to the Covid-19 pandemic.

Janson lives in Leksand with his wife Eva, who is also a musician, and their children.

== Selected discography ==
- 2001 - Live in Köttsjön (with Kalle Moraeus)
- 2005 - Julens bästa vänner (with Kalle Moraeus)
- 2012 - Bengan Jansson / Jan Lundgren / Ulf Wakenius (with Jan Lundgren and Ulf Wakenius)
- 2018 - Hjeltamôs (with Per Gudmundson)
