= There's a Blind Man Playin' Fiddle in the Street =

1968 single by Tages

- Danish single sleeve.

Single by Tages
- B-side: "Like a Woman"
- Released: 8 February 1968
- Recorded: 16 January 1968
- Studio: Europafilm, Stockholm
- Genre: Psychedelic pop; vispop
- Length: 1:57
- Label: Parlophone
- Songwriter: Göran Lagerberg
- Producer: Anders Henriksson

Tages singles chronology
"Mohair Sam" (1967)	"There's a Blind Man Playin' Fiddle in the Street" (1968)	"Fantasy Island" (1968)

Audio
- "There's a Blind Man Playin' Fiddle in the Street" on YouTube

"There's a Blind Man Playin' Fiddle in the Street" (Note: Also known as "There's a Blind Man Playing Fiddle in the Street") is a song written by Swedish bass guitarist Göran Lagerberg, initially recorded by his band Tages. In December 1967, Tages released their fifth album, Studio, which largely was inspired by and saw influences from Swedish folk music; this had a major impact on Lagerberg. Inspired by the Beatles' single "Strawberry Fields Forever" / "Penny Lane" from a meeting with club owner Styrbjörn Colliander, Lagerberg composed the song in a more commercial tone than Studio, while still retaining the genre's influences. First released as a single on 8 February 1968 in Sweden, the song also received release in Denmark, Finland, Norway and the UK, where it was Tages' fourth single release.

"There's a Blind Man" is a "mini-suite", featuring two distinct sections, of which one consists of an intermezzo of fiddles being played together with a counter-melody on guitar. The verses and chorus alternate between major and minor chords. Lyrically, Lagerberg was inspired by a man that often could be seen playing a violin on the streets of Gothenburg. Tages recorded the song in January 1968 with Anders Henriksson producing. The song received critical acclaim in both the Swedish and British press, who mostly praised the chorus and fiddle interludes. Commercially, the song reached number 10 on Tio i Topp in Sweden and number 20 on Danmarks Radio chart in Denmark, becoming their final top-10 release in the former country. In retrospect, it has been considered one of Tages' best singles.

== Background ==
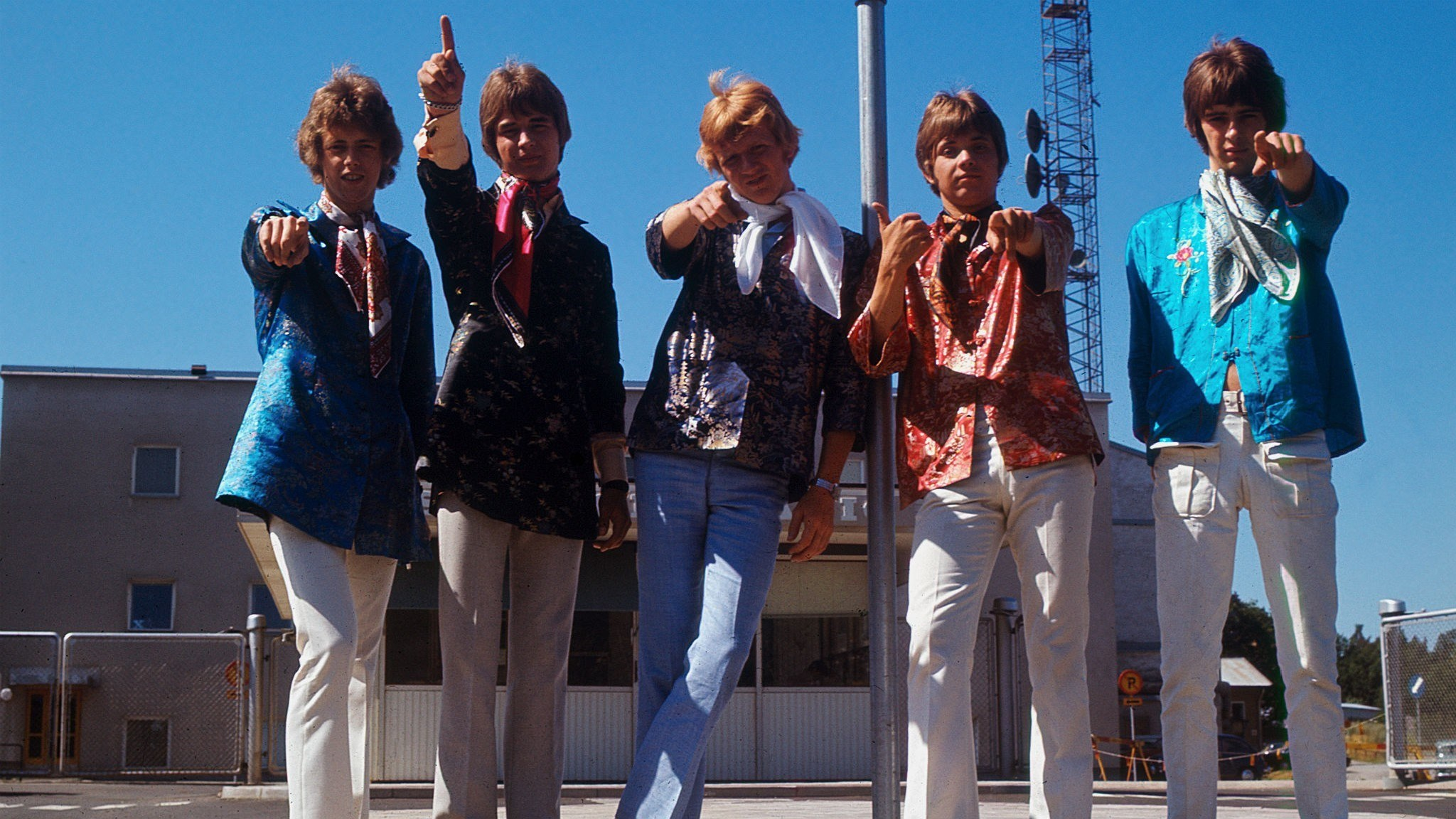
Tages in 1967, prior to the release of Studio

On 4 December 1967, Tages released their fifth studio album Studio. A blend of psychedelic music, rock and Swedish folk music, it was largely written by bassist Göran Lagerberg and producer Anders Henriksson. Although the former had been the band's primary creative force since their fourth album Contrast (1967), Henriksson came to play a large part in Tages' career, introducing them to elements of Swedish folk music, owing to his heritage from Dalarna. Particularly Lagerberg found this interesting, stating that he "wanted to utilize" and pay respect to his cultural heritage while adopting it into his music. Lagerberg aspired to follow-up Studio with a release that was even more folk-influenced.

During the Christmas of 1967, the band members along with manager Rolf Hedin took a break following the recording of Studio, going on a vacation to Las Palmas in the Canary Islands that allowed Lagerberg and the others to focus on writing new material for the band. Around the same time, Tages found out that Studio had become a commercial failure, with many fans finding it "too uncommercial". This took a toll on the band, particularly Lagerberg, who considered the album to be "some of the best" he had written up until that point. Keeping this in mind, he decided that the follow-up single which Parlophone demanded by February 1968 would be "more commercial" than Studio was.

== Composition and recording ==
Lagerberg was inspired to compose the song by Styrbjörn Colliander, owner of the Cue Club, where Tages would perform regularly. Colliander would play him the Beatles' double A-Side single "Strawberry Fields Forever" / "Penny Lane" (1967) for the first time. Lagerberg considered the song "one of the best he had heard thus far", leading to him "rushing home with the songs still ringing in my ears" and composing it on the piano he newly purchased. Lagerberg declared the song was written "rather quickly" after that, estimating it to have taken "only a few minutes, perhaps an hour" to write. Musically, the song continues the blend of rock and Swedish folk music present on Studio, heavily featuring the titular fiddle in various interludes across the song. There's a Blind Man" has been described as both psychedelic pop and vispop.

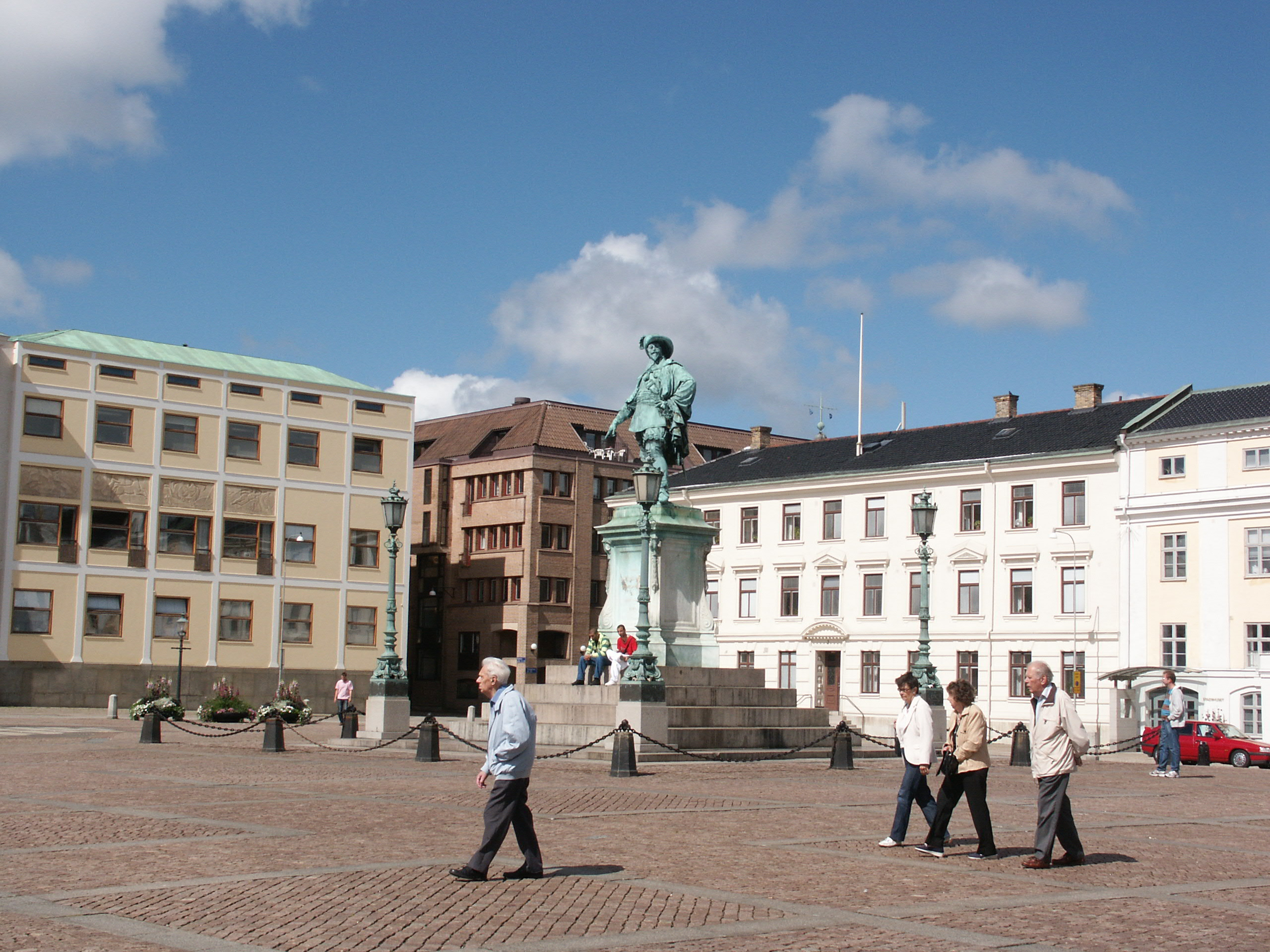
The lyrics were inspired by a man playing the violin across Gothenburg, including Gustaf Adolfs torg.

Musically, the song acts as a "mini-suite", consisting of two distinct sections: the vocal verses and choruses along with the "musical interludes that are dependent on fiddles". The song was primarily composed in G minor, a "tonality which persists" through the musical interludes and verses, though "modulates up to G major during the bridge and choruses", creating a sense of "easiness and hope" once the chorus arrives. The intermezzo which appears in between choruses and verses "notably includes" lead guitarist Anders Töpel's playing, which acts as a counter-melody to "the established sound of the fiddles". During the more conventional parts of the song, a "clinking piano" dominates most of the sound frame.

Lyrically, Lagerberg took inspiration from an almost "mythical figure" that could be spotted playing the violin on the sidewalks and town squares of Gothenburg, Tages' home town. Though initially shrouded in mystery, the man in question was confirmed to be a real individual, namely John Eriksson. Eriksson, who originally came from Kungälv, was allegedly divorced by his wife during the mid-1920s, leading to him "hiking to Gothenburg" and spending "up to sixty years of his life" there, playing the violin "in sorrow over his lost love". "There's a Blind Man" was recorded on 16 January 1968 at Europafilm Studios in Mariehäll together with Tages regular producer Anders Henriksson. Audio engineer Björn Almstedt was also present at the recording session. Henriksson contributed piano to the song, while the Spelmanslag from the open-air museum Skansen in Stockholm provided the fiddles.

== Release and commercial performance ==
"There's a Blind Man Playin' Fiddle in the Street" was released through Parlophone on 8 February 1968, in an edition of only 2,000 copies. (Note: Catalogue number SD 6024.) In a lack of new material, the B-side of the single, "Like a Woman", was taken from Studio. Around the same time as the Swedish release, Parlophone issued the song as their fourth and final single in Denmark as Tages were heavily marketed there, their sixth and final release in Finland followed shortly by a Norwegian release in March, proving to be their 11th and final there, too. Shortly before the release of the single, in January 1968, Tages' long time manager Rolf Hedin quit the role, instead being replaced by Börje Karlsson, who steadily began negotiating with new record label MGM Records for future releases worldwide a few months after Hedin's departure. Capitalizing on possibly losing the band from its roster, the British sublabel of Parlophone chose to issue "There's a Blind Man" as Tages' fourth single in the UK, on 7 June 1968. (Note: Catalogue number R 5702.)

Despite having sufficient promotion in Sweden, the single was a relative chart failure compared to earlier releases. On Swedish record chart Tio i Topp, the single debuted at number 14 on 23 March 1968, staying there for only one week. Despite being voted out on 30 March, it returned to Tio i Topp on 6 April at a peak position of number 10. The song was last seen on 20 April 1968 at a position of number 13, having spent four non-consecutive weeks on the chart. Comparatively, Tages' previous charting single "Treat Her Like a Lady", had stayed on the chart for seven weeks. As it was a chart failure on Tio i Topp, the song did not sell well enough to land a spot on sales chart Kvällstoppen. In Denmark, it became Tages' final charting single, reaching number 20 for one week on 28 February. In the UK, despite being fairly promoted by British Parlophone, the song failed to crack the Record Retailer chart.

The song was not released on Studio, even though the B-side was included on the album. "There's a Blind Man" got its first album release on the compilation album Good Old Tages, released by Odeon Records in February 1969, followed shortly by the Danish EMI Records release Tages Favoritter in 1974. Both sides of the single were included on Tages' career-spanning compilation Tages 1964-68! on 25 March 1983, getting their first CD-release once the album was re-issued in that format on 18 November 1992. A more circulated release of both tracks came on the CD Fantasy Island from the This One's For You! box set, released on 28 November 1994. Finally, "There's a Blind Man" was featured on both the 1998 and 2010 re-issues of Studio as a bonus track.

== Reception and legacy ==
Upon release, the single was met with critical acclaim in the Swedish press. In a review for Göteborgs-Posten, the staff writer describes it as a "wonderful addition to Tages discography", stating that the "beautifully orchestrated sections" would've given the song a spot on "their latest album [Studio]". They note that while they "don't believe it to be a chart hit", it would become a "Swedish folk classic" with time. Similarly, in Arbetet, the writer also describes the song as a "return to their album Studio", owing to the fiddles played. They note the "inventive interplay" between major and minor chords to be "slightly genial", while also stating that the single may become a hit on Tio i Topp. In GT, the staff describe the song as "great", while also noting a "perfect follow up to Studio", which they found to be similar in sound. They state that it was "unbelievably catchy" owing primarily to the chorus, which they thought is a "wonderful creation".

In Göteborgs Handels- och Sjöfartstidning, both sides of the single receive praise, though the anonymous writer believes "There's a Blind Man" to be the superior song of the two. They assert the interlude featuring fiddles to be "interesting and unique" compared to the other songs reviewed that day. Despite them noting the "upbeat chorus", the writer is unsure of whether or not it would become a hit, stating the song to be "perhaps a bit too uncommercial". In Hudiksvalls Tidning, the writer considers the song "another one of Tages best", commenting it to be a "top song". They too note the chorus which they call an "earworm singalong" that would get stuck in your head, "whether you like Tages or not".

Despite not charting in the UK, some music magazines reviewed the single. Penny Valentine of Disc and Music Echo found the song's sound "so similar to the Bee Gees" that she "almost collapsed". Writing for New Musical Express, Derek Johnson believe Tages manage to imitate an English sound flawlessly, "despite an annoying title". He ends by stating it to be "worthwhile". Writing for Record Mirror, Peter Jones gives the single five stars, describing it to be "his record of the week", despite the "unusual subject matter". He comments that "the beat" might make the song a hit, ending with the notion that it is "simple but very catchy and well done".

"We though it was pretty cheeky and cool to combine folk tones with rock and pop"

— Göran Lagerberg (2012)

Göran Brandels and Lennart Wrigholm consider "There's a Blind Man" to be the second in a row of releases from the band to be met by "disastrous commercial, though superb critical" reception, following Studio, but preceding their 1968 singles "Fantasy Island" and "I Read You Like an Open Book". Wrigholm states that as was the case with Studio, record buyers felt alienated by Tages "endeavours" with folk music that they "flat out refused" to purchase the band's records. In fact, "There's a Blind Man" was Tages final top-10 single on Tio i Topp; only "Fantasy Island" managed to chart after at a low number 14. Retrospectively, the song has been considered a nod to the Beatles, with Roger Wallis jokingly naming it "There's a Blind Man Playin' Fiddle on Penny Lane" on his radio shows.

== Charts ==
Weekly chart performance for "There's a Blind Man Playin' Fiddle in the Street"
Chart (1968)	Peak position
Denmark (Danmarks Radio)	20
Sweden (Tio i Topp)	10

== Notes and references ==
Notes

== Sources ==
- Brandels, Göran; Wrigholm, Lennart (2012). Boken om Tages: från Avenyn till Abbey Road (in Swedish). Premium Publishing. ISBN 978-91-89136-88-5.
- Hallberg, Eric; Henningsson, Ulf (2012). Tio i Topp - med de utslagna "på försök" 1961–74 (in Swedish) (2nd ed.). Premium. ISBN 978-91-89136-89-2.
- Hallberg, Eric (1993). Eric Hallberg presenterar Kvällstoppen i P3 (in Swedish). Drift. ISBN 9-789-16-302-14-04.
- Tyler, Kieron (2010). Tages - Studio (CD). RPM Retrodisc. Retro 874.
- Wiremark, Kjell (1994). Tages – This One's For You! (CD) (in Swedish). EMI. 4751382.
- Wiremark, Kjell (1998). Tages - Studio (CD) (in Swedish). Parlophone. 7243 4942852 2.
- Wrigholm, Lennart (1991). "Tages: Makalös grej i Götet…". Now & then (in Swedish).
