= Bjerregaard =

Bjerregaard is a surname. Notable people with the surname include:

- André Bjerregaard (born 1991), Danish footballer
- Ditlev Trappo Saugmand Bjerregaard (1852–1916), Danish businessman, traditional musician, and composer
- Helle Bjerregaard (born 1968), Danish footballer
- Henning Bjerregaard (1927–2014), Danish footballer
- Henrik Anker Bjerregaard (1792–1842), Norwegian poet, dramatist and judge
- Johnny Bjerregaard (born 1943), Danish footballer and coach
- Lucas Bjerregaard (born 1991), Danish golfer
- Mathilde Bjerregaard (born 1993), Danish handball player
- Patrick Bjerregaard (born 1995), Danish badminton player
- Per Bjerregaard (born 1946), Danish educated physician and former footballer
- Ritt Bjerregaard (1941–2023), Danish politician
