= Träskofiol =

Swedish musical instrument

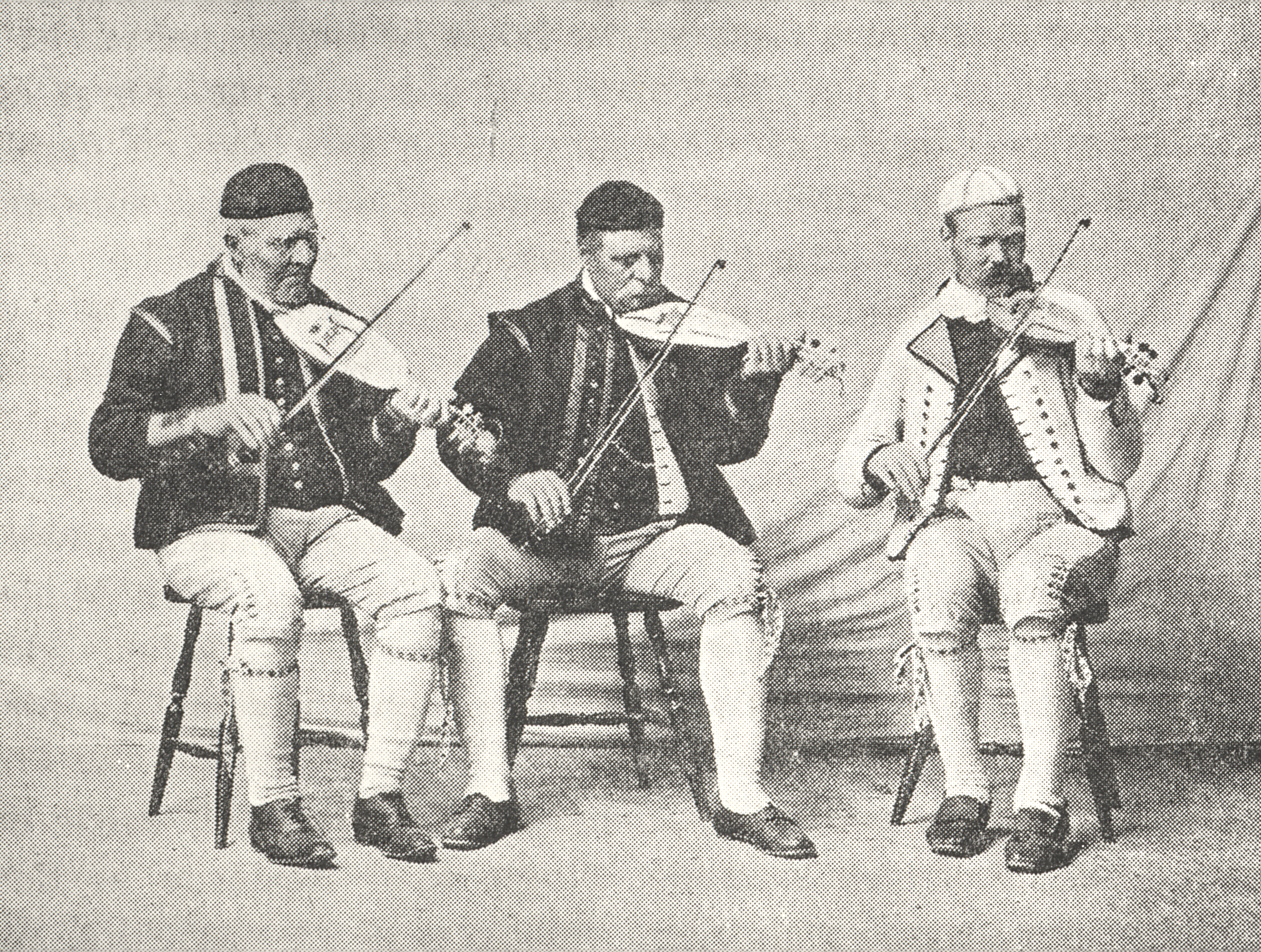
Three men playing Clog fiddles

The träskofiol or clog fiddle is a traditional musical instrument from the southern Swedish province, Skåne, consisting of a violin neck and soundboard added to the body of a clog wooden shoe.

The instrument is one of the limited number of traditional instruments upon which musicians can play in competition for the Zorn Prize to be awarded the title of riksspelman.

An annual world championship in Träskofiol is held in Sweden since 2013.

Prominent players includes Laif Carr, Ninni Carr, Elna Carr, Ale Carr and Peter Pedersen.
