= Swedish bagpipes =

Variety of bagpipes from Sweden

Säckpipa
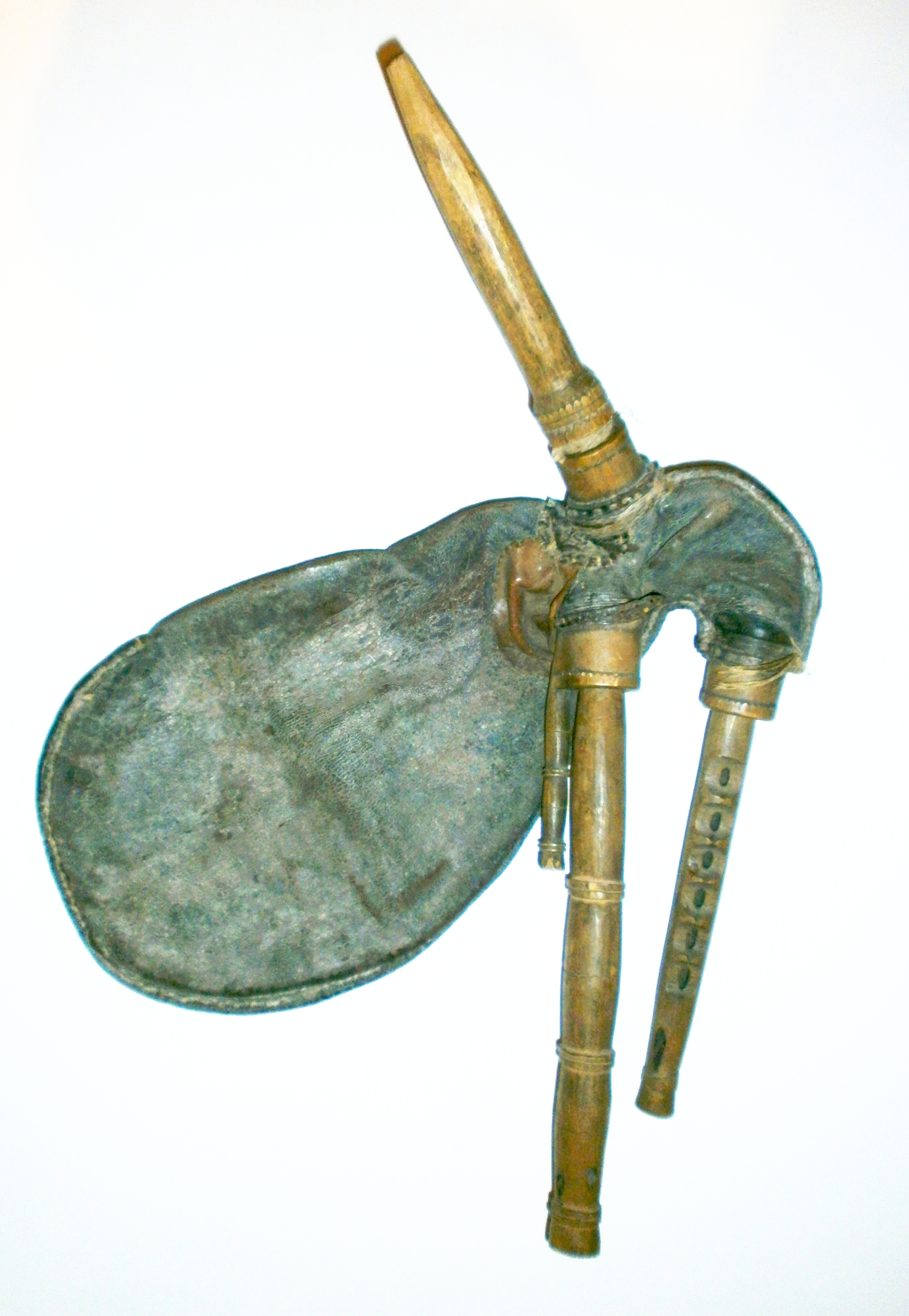
- Other names: Swedish bagpipes
- Classification: Bagpipes

Swedish bagpipes (säckpipa, Swedish: svensk säckpipa, or dråmba, koppe, posu, or bälgpipa) are a variety of bagpipes from Sweden. The term itself generically translates to "bagpipes" in Swedish, but is used in English to describe the specifically Swedish bagpipe from the Dalarna region.

== History ==
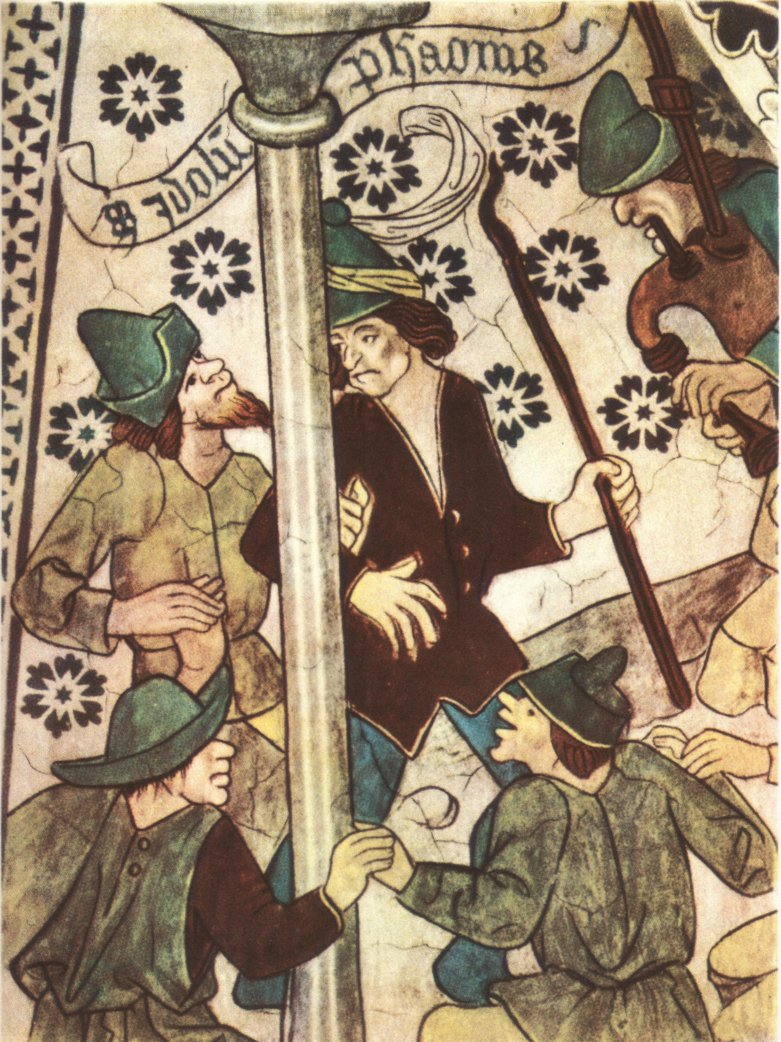
In Härkeberga church in Uppland there is this painting by Albertus Pictor which depicts farmers dancing to sackpipes. The painting is dated to about 1480.

Medieval paintings in churches suggest that the instrument was spread all over Sweden. The instrument was practically extinct by the middle of the 20th century; the instrument that today is referred to as Swedish bagpipes is a construction based on instruments from the western parts of the district called Dalarna, the only region of Sweden where the bagpipe tradition survived into the 20th century.

== Revival ==
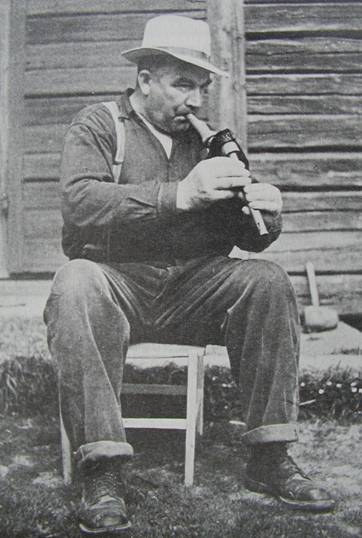
Gudmunds Nils Larsson

In late 1930s, the ethnologist Mats Rehnberg found some bagpipes in the collections of the museum Nordiska museet, and he wrote a thesis on the subject. Rehnberg managed to find the last carrier of Swedish bagpipe tradition, Gudmunds Nils Larsson in the village Dala-Järna. Rehnberg visited Larsson together with a music teacher, Ture Gudmundsson, who managed to reconstruct an instrument, with which Ture later played and recorded two tunes for the national publicly funded radio broadcaster Sveriges Radio.

During the following decades only a few instruments were made, until 1981 when woodworker Leif Eriksson (pipemaker) started to manufacture a model of bagpipes that he himself had developed, and the folk fiddler Per Gudmundson learned to play it. Eriksson's bagpipes was a compromise between the roughly ten different instruments held in museums, and he made some slight modifications to make the instruments better suited for playing with other instruments such as the fiddle.

Today there are several Swedish folk music groups that include the bag pipes in their setting, such as Hedningarna, Svanevit and Dråm (the two latter involving Erik Ask-Upmark and Anna Rynefors). Players of the Swedish pipes are now eligible to compete playing traditional music before a jury to earn the title of riksspelman.

== Construction ==
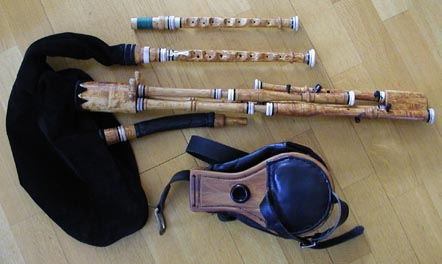
One of Alban Faust's modernised sets of Swedish bagpipes. Chanters in A and G, three drones, and bellows.

The bag is notably smaller than that of many other bagpipes. This, however, is no major problem as the pipes require relatively little air. The chanter has a single cane reed and a cylindrical bore, with a range of one octave. It is essentially diatonic (with a melodic ascending A minor—A major with a flat third—scale starting on E) since cross-fingering has little effect.

Range of the standard säckpipa

=== Evolution ===
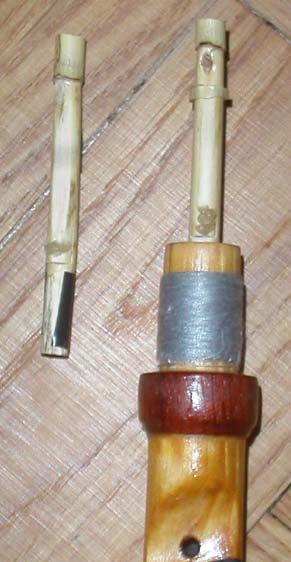
A säckpipa single-reed made of natural cane

- A double hole for the C hole instead of a single one can be bored, one of which can be covered, for example with beeswax, to produce C, and uncovered to produce C#. This makes the key of A major possible.
- The 'tuning hole', a hole traditionally placed on the underside of the chanter and which is used for tuning the bottom note of the chanter (with beeswax to make the hole smaller), can be placed on the top side instead, enabling it to be used as a fingerhole. This adds a low D to the scale.
- A key can be fitted to operate a hole above the usual fingerholes, to give the piper an additional high F#.

The fact that the chanter, with its cylindrical bore and single reed, is extremely unaffected by crossfingering, and that the drone is tuned to the same note and octave as the bottom note of the chanter, makes it possible to play in a closed or semi-closed manner, enabling the player to quickly play the bottom note in between other notes—since this will blend with the sound of the drone, it gives the illusion of silence, and the possibility to play staccato.

The tone of the instrument is quite soft, not too different from that of a harmonica or an accordion.

=== Makers ===
Today, there are a small number of professional or semi-professional bagpipe designers. Leif Eriksson (pipemaker) represents the traditional one; Alban Faust, Börs Anders Öhman, Max Persson and Seth Hamon drive the development towards modern instruments.

== See also ==
- Category:Säckpipa players
