= Evald Thomsen =

Danish violinist (1913–1993)

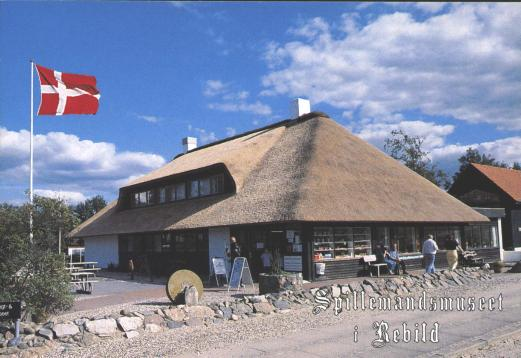
The Folk Music museum of Rebild founded by Evald Thomsen.

Evald Thomsen (1913–1993) was a Danish fiddler and collector and promoter of Danish traditional music. Born in Siem by Skørping in Northern Jutland, Thomsen was taught fiddle from age 7, and played to local dances already as a young boy. He began to collect tunes and instruments. He founded the Rebild Fiddlers, and the Rebild museum of Traditional music. In 1931 he moved to Funen where his wife was from, and he stayed there to 1942 when he went back home to Himmerland.

In 1971 he was made national When the Folk revival movement came to Denmark in the 1970'es he became an icon of the living tradition of Danish fiddle music, and he gained national fame, appearing in radio and television. In the 1960es he toured Denmark with a band composed of his son Hardy Thomsen (violin), his brother Hilbert Thomsen (bass), Hans Jørgen Christensen (violin) and Niels Vilhelm Hansen, (guitar and vocals). He also traveled Europe playing in Norway, the Faroe Islands, iceland, Scotland, Finland and Greenland, and in 1976 he toured the US for a month.

Together with other players from the first half of the 20th century like Æ Tinuser and Frederik Iversen, his versions make up the main stock of Danish traditional music. He is considered by many to be the single most important fiddler and promoter of Danish traditional music in the 20th century.
