= Anna Rynefors =

Swedish musician

Anna Rynefors (born 17 December 1974) is a Swedish musician who plays nyckelharpa and Swedish bagpipe. Together with her husband Erik Ask-Upmark, Rynefors is part of the groups Falsobordone, Dråm and Svanevit. Rynefors became Sweden's first female riksspelman on the Swedish bagpipe in 2005.
