= Rickard Näslin =

Swedish musician

Rickard Näslin (born 24 September 1947 in Östersund) is a Swedish musician based in Jämtland, Sweden. He is a violinist and composer of Swedish folk music. Näslin was a founding member of the folk music group Leikstulaget in 1974, and established the Östersunds Spelmanslag (Fiddle Company of Ostersund) in 1993.

He was honoured with the title of riksspelman (Swedish for 'National Spelman') in 1978 and the Lapp-Nils Medal in 1998.
