= Viksta-Lasse =

Swedish musician

Johan Leonard Larsson (4 November 1897 − 7 June 1983), better known as Viksta-Lasse, was a Swedish fiddler from Eklunda in Uppland.

At the age of ten years, he began playing on a fiddle made from a cigar box. He was a student of sv:Hjort Anders Olsson, who taught him tunes from Bingsjö. He also composed his own tunes, the most famous of which are the three Eklunda Polskas.

In the 1930s he met Eric Sahlström, and the two often played together for many following years.
