= Svenska Folkdansringen =

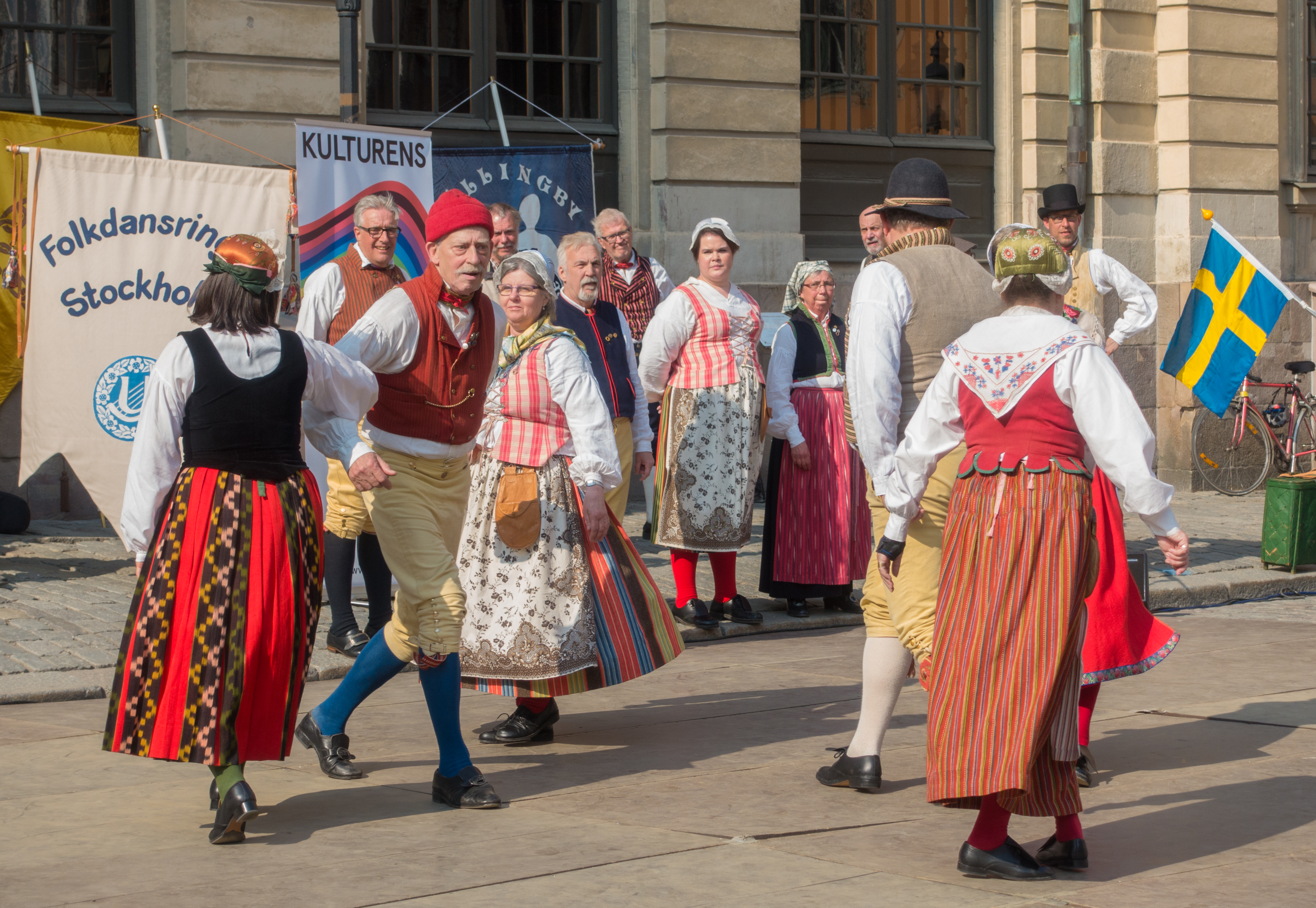

Svenska Folkdansringen (The Swedish Folk Dance Ring), usually just called "Folkdansringen," is Sweden's largest amateur folk culture organization. Its primary focus is folk dance, but all aspects of Swedish folk culture fall under its purview, including music, crafts, and traditional dress.

Folkdansringen was founded in 1920 as a national umbrella organization for Swedish folk dance groups. The same year they began publishing the journal Folkdansringen. In 1922, the organization changed its name to "Svenska Ungdomsringen för Bygdekultur" ("The Swedish Youth Ring for Village Culture"), or "Ungdomsringen" for short. The journal was retitled Hembygden ("The Home Village.") In 2005, the organization reverted to its original name, though the journal retains the title Hembygden.

Folkdansringen is also the institution behind the Zorn Trials, by which musicians can play for the title of National Folk Musician of Sweden.
