= Spilåpipa =

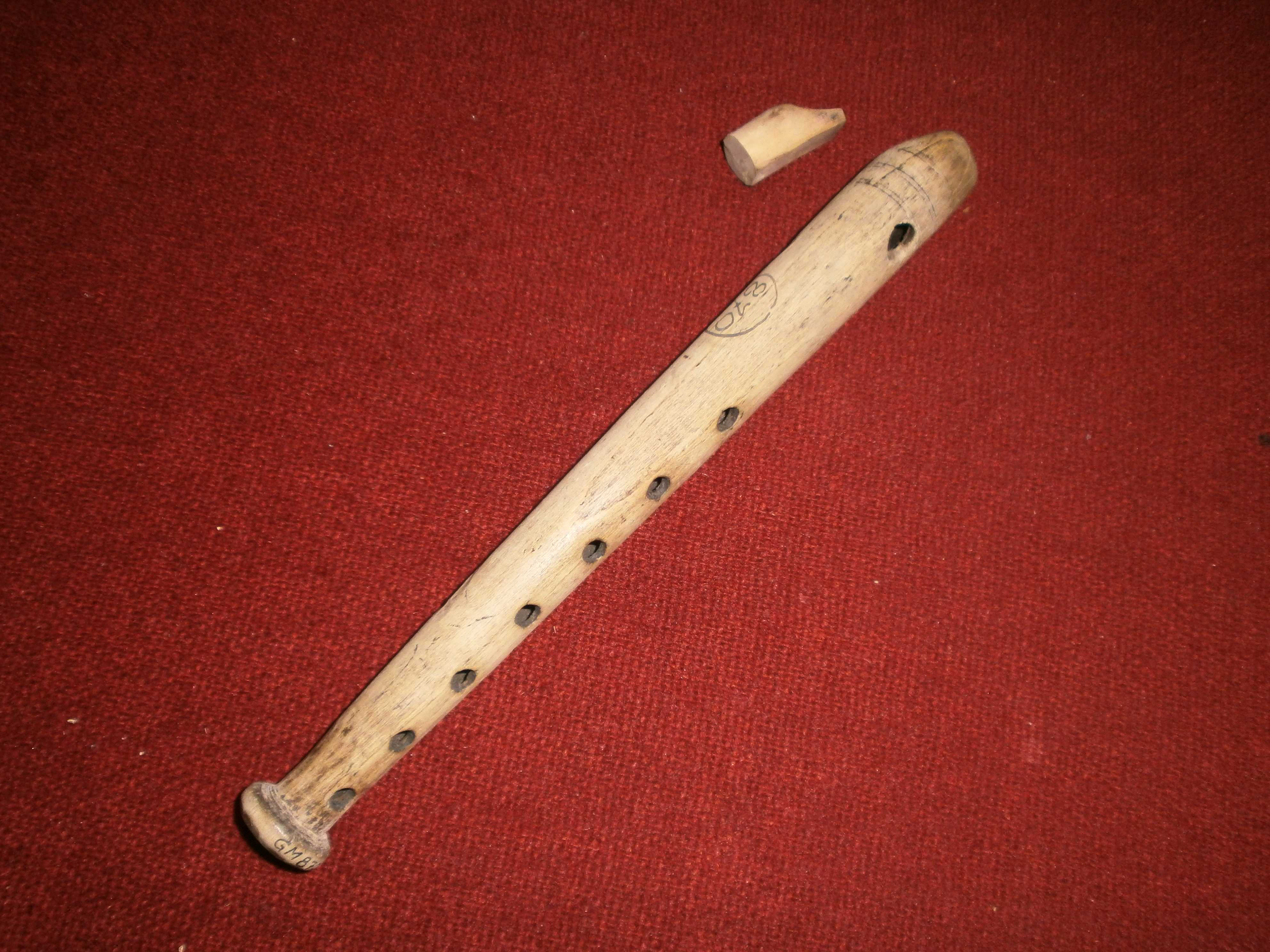

The spilåpipa (or spelpipa, spälapipa, låtapipa) is a type of fipple flute traditional in Sweden. It is traditionally from the pastoral/transhumant cultures of that country, though more widespread in the modern era. It is originally most common in the transhumant areas, generally north of Svealand. During the 1900s, Älvdalen was a centre of conservation of spilåpipa music, and accordingly that area's name for the instrument has become the most widespread. A significant variation of the instrument is the härjedalspipa, but it has many variants. The instrument has experienced a revival in recent decades as modern folk musicians have become curious about traditional instruments.

== Construction ==
The spilåpipa is a fipple flute into which a narrow gap is blown which directs the airstream onto a blade in the frame which produces the sound. The instrument has eight finger holes on the top, but no thumb holes. It has a modal tuning, which is not necessarily compatible with much of modern Western music. The player is easily able to affect the intonation.

== Notable players ==
An important spilåpipare (player) was Sväs Anders Ersson (1872-1968) from Evertsberg in Älvdalen, Dalarna. In modern times, players include Anders Rosén (Malung), Pelle Jakobsson, Hars Åke Hermansson (Malung) and Ulrika Bodén. Though not Swedish, the Dutch musician Els Doekes has received the prestigious bronze Zorn Badge for playing the spilåpipa.
