= Barbro Karlén =

Swedish writer and dressage rider (1954–2022)

- Born: Barbro Helen Margaretha Karlén; 24 May 1954; Örgryte, Gothenburg, Västra Götaland, Sweden
- Died: 12 October 2022 (aged 68); United States
- Occupations: Writer, dressage rider
- Spouse: Lars Sjögreen
- Children: 1
- Writing career
- Genres: Poetry; Autobiography
- Notable works: Man on Earth; And the Wolves Howled; When the Storm Comes; A Moment in The Blossom Kingdom

Barbro Helen Margaretha Ask-Upmark (née Karlén; 24 May 1954 – 12 October 2022) was a Swedish writer, poet and dressage rider who claimed to be the reincarnation of the German-born Jewish diarist and Holocaust victim Anne Frank.

== Career ==
Karlén became a prolific writer from an early age. A book of her poetry, Människan på jorden (published in English as Man on Earth), published when she was 12 years old, became a best-seller and led to her widespread recognition within Sweden as a child prodigy.

Karlén claimed to have memories of being Anne Frank in a past life, a claim identified by at least one Anne Frank scholar as being indicative of the way the memory of Anne Frank has "transcended reality". In an autobiographical work, And the Wolves Howled, she told a story of visiting Amsterdam as a child with her family, where she claimed that she found her own way to the Frank house and identified details of the house's construction and furnishings that she said had been changed since Frank's time. A fabulist autobiographer about the Holocaust, Binjamin Wilkomirski, condemned Karlén's claims as nonsense: "It is a fraud in a moral sense." He contended that Karlén was "simply disturbed", a rhetoric which ironically mirrored later criticism leveled against his own debunked claims.

Karlén, now known as Ask-Upmark, later had a career as a dressage rider. She moved to the USA in 1999 and was in 2002 awarded the United States Dressage Federation Gold Medal Award, and later Silver and Bronze medal in 2006. In 2006 she started to work for Racewood Simulators as an expert and rider developing simulators for education and training of dressage riders. In 2016 she went to Tryon International Equestrian Center & Resort for a similar position.

=== Family ===
Barbro Karlén was the daughter of Sölve Carlén and Maria Carlsson, but became the step-daughter to professor Erik Ask-Upmark and changed her surname to "Ask-Upmark". She was married to Lars Sjögreen 1972–1973 and they are parents to the musician Erik Ask-Upmark born 1973.

Barbro died after a long term illness on October 12, 2022.
