= Rasmus Storm's Notebook =

Handwritten collection of tunes

Rasmus Storm's Notebook is a handwritten collection of tunes written in the 1760s by Rasmus Storm. It is one of the earliest and most important collections of Danish traditional music. Storm was a Danish fiddler and dancing master (teacher) born in 1733 on the Island of Funen. He was the son of an indentured peasant and worked as an assistant to a merchant. He began compiling his tunebook around 1760, but it is unknown where he learned the tunes. Among the tunes are minuets, polskas, bourrées, marches and rigaudons – as well as otherwise unknown dance types such as "dantz" and "serras" and several folk melodies. Today the notebook is kept by the Danish Ethnological collection.
