= Eric Sahlström =

Swedish musician

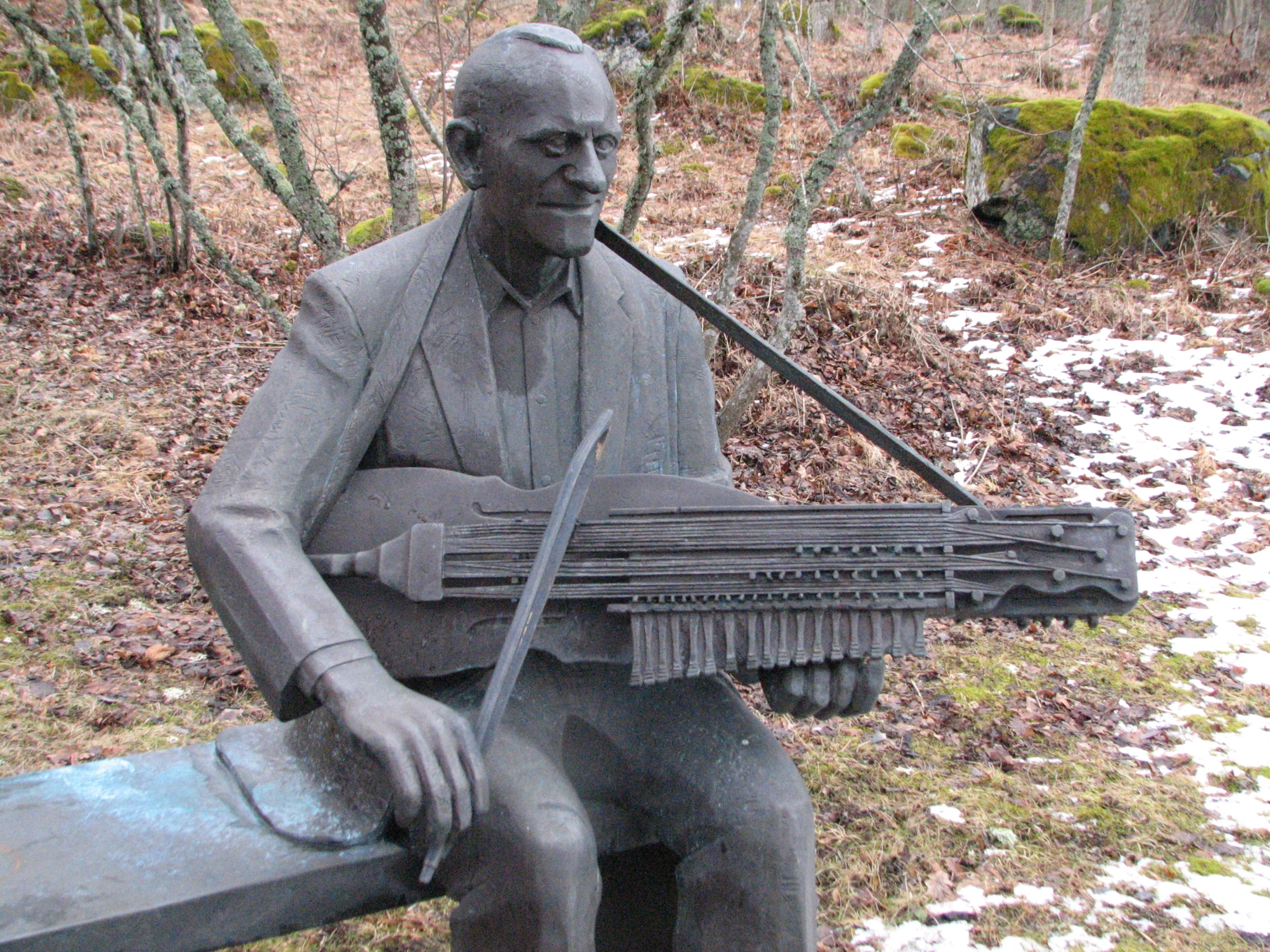
Bronze statue of Eric Sahlström.

Eric Sahlström (1912–1986) was a Swedish player of the nyckelharpa, and riksspelman awardee from Tobo in northern Uppland, Sweden.

Sahlström won great respect for his musicianship in an era when folk music was not yet an established art form. He was hired by Bo Nilson in 1962 to play in a new work at the Venice Biennale. In 1968 he received the Swedish Local Heritage Federation's medal from Gustaf VI Adolf and the same year the Royal Swedish Academy of Music's Medaljen för tonkonstens främjande ("Medal for Music Promotion"). He was nominated as a music professor at the Royal College of Music, Stockholm. In 1976 he was recognised for "artistic quality and importance for Swedish culture", as the first musician to receive that award.

Eric Sahlström is one of those who most contributed most to the renaissance of the nyckelharpa ("keyed fiddle") in modern times. The instrument at that point had some small popularity amongst a handful of musicians in Uppland, but Sahlström as a design engineer and luthier further developed the instrument, including refining the chromatic nyckelharpa which can play any key. He also composed a large number of folk songs. Among the most famous include the waltz Spelmansglädje ("Fiddler Joy") and the polskas Stormyren and Hardrevet.

A bronze statue of Sahlström made by Ingvar Jörpeland in 1992 was installed by the church of Tegelsmora, his burial-ground. The Eric Sahlström Institute in Tobo is named after Sahlström.
