= Börs Anders Öhman =

Swedish folk musician

Börs Anders Öhman is a Swedish folk musician born in 1949 in Valparaíso, Chile. He is a Swedish bagpipe maker and innovator.

He is a direct descendant of the last appointed parish musician from Järna parish in Darlecarlia, Gudmunds Nils Larsson. Öhman's parents were active in the Salvation Army, and he learnt to play brass wind instruments at an early age. When he was eight years old he was allowed to join a marching band in Mjölby, even though he was too young to be a member and found it hard to keep up with the other musicians when they were marching.

He continued to play military music, and was a member of the Royal Svea Life Guards' Music Band with the tuba as his main instrument, and has been a part of the Royal Guards and Royal Mounted Guards at Stockholm Castle for 15 years.

He started building Swedish bagpipes in the 1980s, and has also built ocarinas, chalumeaus and Swedish cowhorns, and has exhibited his instruments.

In the 1990´s he and the Ocarinamaker Alexander Vaida became good friends, Alexander and Börs Anders spent a lot of time playing together. Alexander's ocarinas with their unique and exquisite sound inspired Börs Anders into building his own ocarinas in wood, you can even see him playing together with his friend Alexander on reptage from swedish television.

Öhman has also worked as a music teacher, and as a singer in the dubbed versions of TV shows and movies including Bananas in Pyjamas, The Lion King, and Rock-a-Doodle.

== Discography ==
Some of his CDs are:

- Bo Sander & Börs Anders Öhman - Två Profiler

- Börs Anders med Vänner - Playing chalumeau, Swedish bagpipes, Swedish cowhorn, Bukkehorn, Ocarina, Birch trumpet, Didgeridoo
