= Like a Woman (song) =

1967 song by Tages

- UK single release

Single by Tages

from the album Studio
- A-side: "There's a Blind Man Playin' Fiddle in the Street"
- Released: 8 February 1968
- Recorded: 25 October 1967 (Note: "Göran Brandels and Lennart Wrigholm instead give the recording date of the song as between the 8th and 9th of October 1967.)
- Studio: EMI, London
- Genre: Psychedelic pop
- Length: 2:21
- Label: Parlophone
- Songwriter(s): Anders Henriksson; Göran Lagerberg; Danne Larsson
- Producer(s): Anders Henriksson (Note: "Like a Woman" was co-produced by an uncredited Ron Richards.)

Tages singles chronology
"Mohair Sam" (1967)	"There's a Blind Man Playin' Fiddle in the Street" / "Like a Woman" (1968)	"Fantasy Island" (1968)

Audio
- "Like a Woman" on YouTube

"Like a Woman" is a song written by Swedish producer Anders Henriksson, bassist Göran Lagerberg and guitarist Danne Larsson, originally recorded by Lagerberg and Larsson's band Tages in 1967. Tages recorded the track at EMI Studios in London. It was initially released on the band's fifth album Studio (1967), before being used as the B-side of their 1968 single "There's a Blind Man Playin' Fiddle in the Street". The title references a girl that Lagerberg knew and musically bases on characteristics of psychedelic pop, including guitars run through leslie speakers.

== Background and composition ==
"At Europafilm Studios in Stockholm, we could compose while in the studio. Working at Abbey Road [Studios] proved to be too expensive, meaning we had to write elsewhere"

— Anders Henriksson (2012)

In early October 1967, Swedish pop group Tages started recording their fifth album Studio for Christmas release. Their record label Parlophone had arranged for a three-week tour of England during that month, while also providing Tages with a chance to record at EMI Studios in London during the final few days of their visit there. After embarking on their tour, the studio was booked for three days, between 23 and 25 October. The group initially cut "It's in a Dream", an original composition by Henriksson and Lagerberg, before realizing that they had no more compositions. According to Henriksson, him and Lagerberg "desperately tried writing a song" on the 24th of October in their hotel room. Larsson was credited as a co-writer because he contributed slightly to the lyrics, especially during the chorus. Nonetheless, the composition was recorded the following day, with Henriksson producing and additionally contributing piano.

Musically, "Like a Woman" is one of the more "straight-forward" psychedelic pop on Studio, as it incorporate several distinct features of the genre. Lead guitarist Anders Töpel feeds his electric guitar through a leslie speaker during the bridge which adds an "ethereal sound" to the song. It is composed in the key of D major and is largely based on the drumming of Lasse Svensson, which according to Kieron Tyler is reminiscent of the Zombies "Care of Cell 44", from their 1968 album Odessey and Oracle. In addition to singing lead, Lagerberg additionally overdubbed himself harmonizing the song with the other two songwriters, adding a "layer of depth" to the composition. A bridge approximately halfway through the song additionally change the time signature and key of the song to a minor key, giving the song a "rushed sense of uneasiness."

Like Tages fourth single "The One for You" (1965), Larsson was inspired by a woman he had met, though not specifically where she came from. Together with the later track "She's Having a Baby Now", "Like a Woman" provides Studio with some of the more "morably questionable" lyrics, with Lagerberg "continuously wailing about" how a "sixteen year old girl moves like a woman". The youngest member of Tages at the time, Larsson was only nineteen himself at the time of the song's composition.

== Release and reception ==
Tages initially previewed the song on the Sveriges Television show Timmen, recorded and broadcast on 11 November 1967. A few weeks later, Parlophone released "Like a Woman" as part of Tages fifth album Studio, on 4 December 1967. On the album, the song is sequenced as the third track, in between "It's My Life" and "People Without Faces". Two months later, on 8 February 1968, the song was issued as the B-side of Tages' single "There's a Blind Man Playin' Fiddle in the Street", apparently in a lack of new material. Despite being a B-side, "Like a Woman" managed to gain a chart position in Denmark, reaching number 20 on the Danmarks Radio top-twenty chart in late February of that year. It was their final charting song in that country. Tages also performed it in the 1968 short film Dalamania, which starred them.

According to writers at Expressen, "Like a Woman" was more "conventional" compared to some of the "unorthodox material" otherwise found on Studio, and marks the song as a highlight, despite the "strange lyrics". Similarly, in Aftonbladet, a reviewer claims "Like a Woman" to be a "delightful pop song" more in the vein of their previous album Contrast (1967). They note the mixing of the drums, which they note to be "perfectly decent" and adds a "strong backbeat to an already strong song". In Svenska Dagbladet, the writers note "Like a Woman" as a highlight of side A of the album, writing that "it took a slight break from the "Folk-inspired songs" which preceded it on Studio. Despite this, in Göteborgs Handels- och Sjöfartstidning, the song is noted as inferior to "There's a Blind Man" in a comparison of the two upon the single's release. Arbetet does however, call it a "strong two-sider", believing it to be one of "their strongest singles yet".

In addition to appearing on Studio, "Like a Woman" has appeared on most of Tages' compilation albums, the first one being February 1969's Good Old Tages. It was included on Tages' career-spanning double compilation Tages, 1964-1968!, in 1983, being one of the few B-sides and album tracks to appear on the album. When that album was re-issued on CD in 1992, "Like a Woman" received its first release in that format. After being re-issued on the CD Fantasy Island from the box set This One's For You! in 1994, it was finally released as part of CD re-issues of Studio in both 1998 and 2010.

== Personnel ==
Personnel according to the liner notes of the 1998 re-issue of Studio. Lead vocalist Tommy Blom does not appear on the recording.

Tages

- Göran Lagerberg – lead and harmony vocals, bass guitar
- Danne Larsson – rhythm guitar, harmony vocals
- Anders Töpel – lead guitar
- Lasse Svensson – drums, percussion

Technical

- Anders Henriksson – producer, technician, harmony vocals, piano, organ
- Ron Richards – co-producer
- Ken Scott – technician
- Jeff Jarrat – technician

== Notes and references ==
Notes

== Sources ==
- Brandels, Göran; Wrigholm, Lennart (2012). Boken om Tages: från Avenyn till Abbey Road (in Swedish). Premium Publishing. ISBN 978-91-89136-88-5.
- Hallberg, Eric; Henningsson, Ulf (2012). Tio i Topp - med de utslagna "på försök" 1961–74 (in Swedish) (2nd ed.). Premium. ISBN 978-91-89136-89-2.
- Hallberg, Eric (1993). Eric Hallberg presenterar Kvällstoppen i P3 (in Swedish). Drift. ISBN 9-789-16-302-14-04.
- Tyler, Kieron (2010). Tages - Studio (CD). RPM Retrodisc. Retro 874.
- Wiremark, Kjell (1994). Tages – This One's For You! (CD) (in Swedish). EMI. 4751382.
- Wiremark, Kjell (1998). Tages - Studio (CD) (in Swedish). Parlophone. 7243 4942852 2.
- Wrigholm, Lennart (1991). "Tages: Makalös grej i Götet…". Now & then (in Swedish).
