= Spelmanslag =

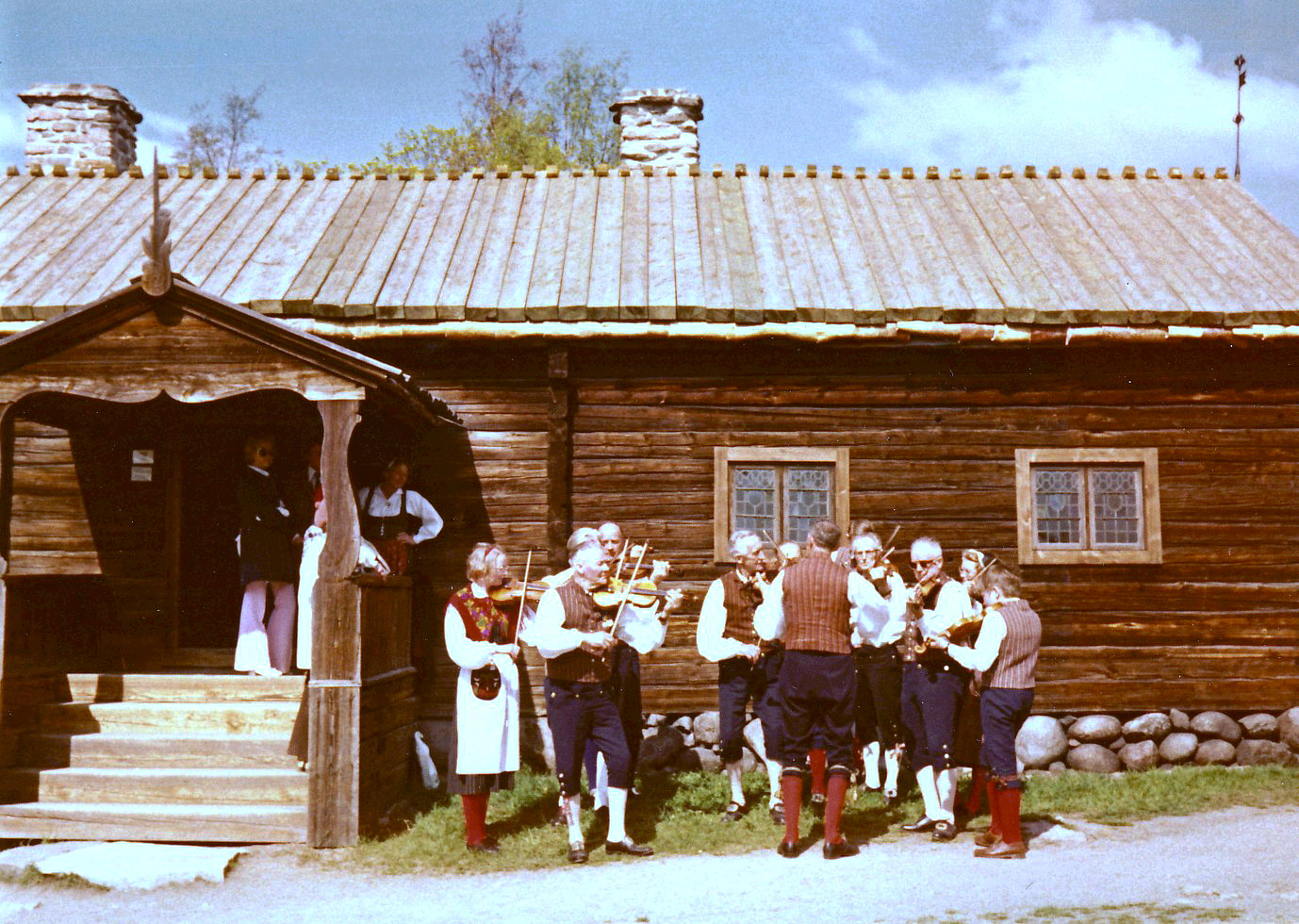
A spelmanslag plays at Skansen in 1972.

The spelmanslag (Swedish: [ˈspêːlmansˌlɑːɡ]) is an amateur organization of Swedish folk musicians, usually dominated by fiddles, who play tunes together. Often these groups play tunes from the specific area of Sweden with which they are affiliated. The term has also the same meaning for Norwegian folk music. Spelmanslag meetings tend to serve social function as much as they do musical ones; and money from paid performances generally goes to the group, rather than its constituent individuals.

== History ==
The first Swedish spelmanslag was Dalaföreningens spelmanslag, formed in 1940 by folk musicians from Dalarna who at the time were living in Stockholm. Over the course of the 1940s, the phenomenon spread throughout the province of Dalarna, and in the 1950s it became a national trend.

The spelmanslag movement saw new life beginning in 2003, with the establishment of the annual student spelmanslag world championships (studentspelmanslag-VM) at the Linköping Folk Festival. A number of student spelmanslag have been formed in order to compete—in 2003, there were four competing teams; by 2007 the number had risen to fifteen. These student groups tend to be characterized by high-energy playing, and generally do not limit themselves to tunes from one particular region within Sweden.

== Sound ==
The spelmanslag has a characteristic "wall of sound," produced by a large number of musicians playing a melody, with one or a small number of others producing a secondary harmony part, usually based in thirds and sixths. Most spelmanslag are dominated by fiddles, though some are dedicated primarily to the nyckelharpa. Often (but not always), the spelmanslag will also have one or more instruments that support the melody with chord progressions, such as cittra (zither), accordion, bass, and/or guitar.

== See also ==
- Spelman (music)
- Swedish folk music
- Riksspelman
- Spelemann - player of Norwegian folk music
- Spelemannslag - organization of Norwegian folk musicians
