= Näverlapp =

Swedish folk instrument

The näverlapp ("birch bark patch") is a very primitive Swedish folk instrument consisting of a thin piece of birch bark, two or three centimeters square. This piece, which has a rounded top, is placed between the lip and the lower teeth; when a thin stream of breath is blown over the piece of bark, it produces a clear, strong tone akin to a clarinet but with less range (about one and a half octaves). As the patch of birch becomes soaked with saliva, which it does after a few minutes, it begins to sound worse and worse.

== Recordings ==
Jan Lundström plays the näverlapp in a few songs on Låtar från Hedemora och Säterbygden on the label Wisa WISC 724 (MC) Recording year: 1990
