= Spelman (music) =

Player of Swedish folk music

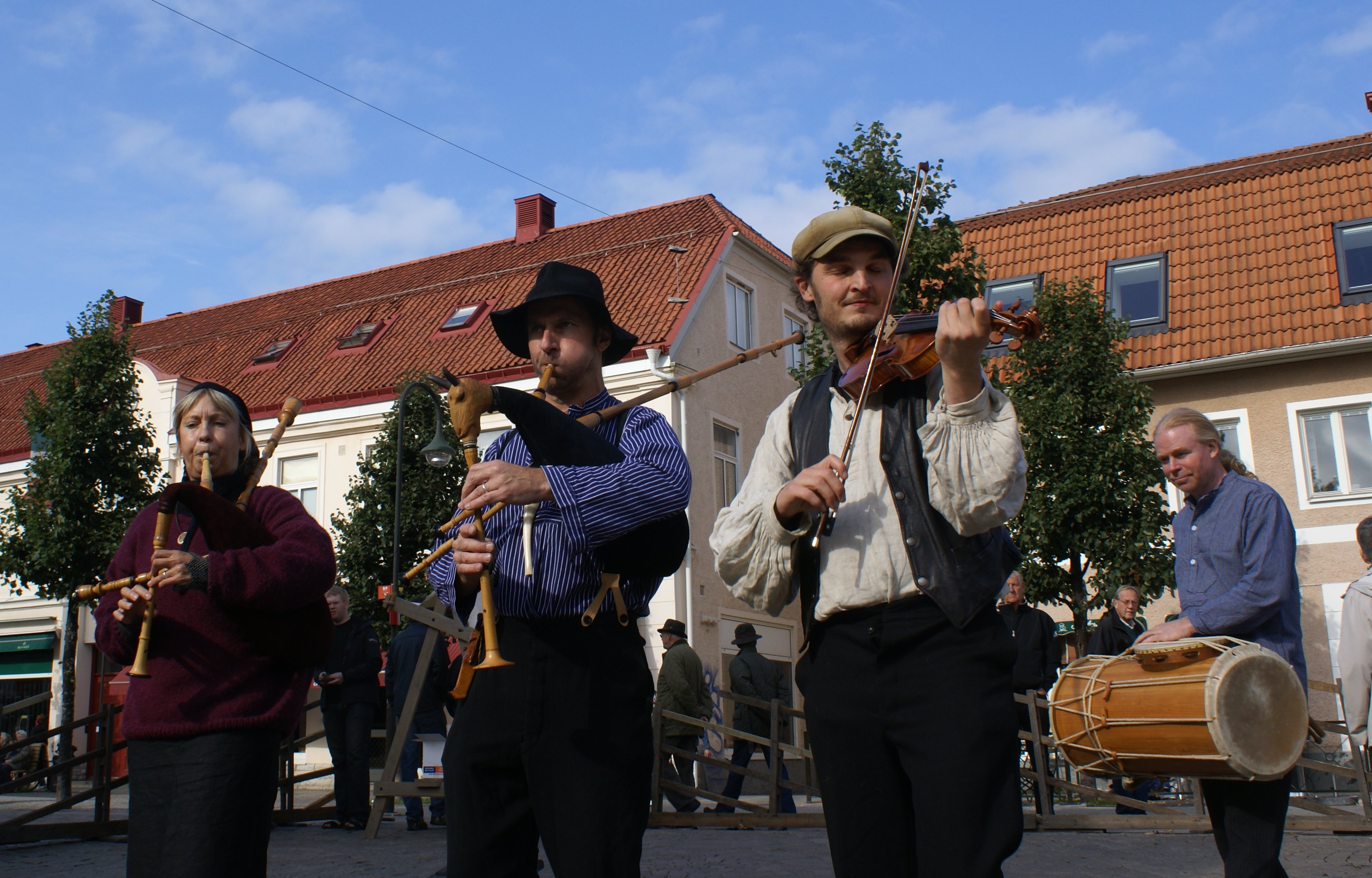
Spelmän playing in Jönköping, Sweden

A spelman (Swedish: [ˈspêːlman]) is a player of Swedish folk music. The term has also the same meaning for Norwegian folk music, and corresponds directly to the term spillemand in Danish traditional music. Less often spelmän may be folk musicians from other Nordic countries, from other European countries, from non-European countries, and even musicians in other genres. The meaning of the Swedish word spelman is very similar to that of the English "fiddler," except that it is not tied to a specific instrument. Because of the commonality of the fiddle in Swedish folk music, the word is often translated as fiddler in any case. Technically, the actual Swedish word for fiddler would be "fiolspelman" (fiddle spelman).

The other common translation of this word is folk musician. The problem here is that the Swedish word "folkmusiker," meaning folk musician, was invented explicitly in opposition to the older word "spelman." Ale Möller coined the term "folkmusiker" to refer to musicians who played Swedish folk music professionally during the folk revival, but were not necessarily grounded in the spelman tradition.

Some have also considered the term spelman (literally "play-man") to be problematic given its implication that Swedish folk musicians are normatively male. The term "folkmusikant" has been proposed as a gender-neutral alternative, but has seen little traction.

== See also ==
- Spelmanslag
- Riksspelman
- Spelemann - player of Norwegian folk music
- Spelemannslag - organization of Norwegian folk musicians
