= Per Gudmundson =

Swedish folk musician

Per Gudmundson, born 1955, is a Swedish folk musician. He plays the fiddle and has also been instrumental in the revival of the Swedish bagpipes in Swedish folk music together with instrument maker Leif Eriksson.

He grew up in Falun, Dalecarlia, and plays music within the Rättvik tradition. Since 1987 he is also a member of the group Frifot, and has toured extensively with them in a number of countries.

In 2006 he was awarded the Zorn Badge in gold.

Gudmundson and Bengan Janson received the Grammis award for Folk Music of the Year in 2019, for their album Hjeltamôs.

== Discography ==
- Frifot, first released as Möller, Willemark & Gudmundson, 1991 (with Frifot)
- Järven, 1996 (with Frifot)
- Frifot, 1999 (with Frifot)
- Ola & Per, 2001 (with Ola Bäckström)
- Sluring, 2003 (with Frifot)
- Flöde, 2004 (with Björn Ståbi)
- Flyt, 2007 (with Frifot)
- Hjeltamôs, 2018 (with Bengan Janson)
