= Æ Tinuser =

Danish traditional band

Æ Tinuser (Standard Danish: Tinus brødrene, English The Tinus brothers) was a Danish traditional band who were famous exponents of their genre from the 1950s to the late 1970s.

The group consisted of three brothers, Ejnar (1913–84; trombone and bass drum), Karl (1911–83; piano) and Hans Nielsen (1906–95; fiddle) from Vrøgum, near Oksbøl. After their father, the musician Tinus Nielsen, they were collectively known as "Æ Tinuser" (The Tinuses) in the local Jutish dialect. Their musical style combined the traditional fiddle music of their area with a danceable beat, with Ejnar Nielsen playing trombone and bass drum simultaneously. For several decades they were a cherished part of the dance scene in the area around Varde, often playing at the weekly dances at the inn in Ho, near Blåvandshuk. A documentary was made about them, directed by Jørgen Vestergaard. Among their famous pieces are "Den gammel hans støk" (after their father) and "Hans Jensen hans støk i Blåvand" (after Hans Jensen), both of which are stock pieces for contemporary Danish traditional musicians.

Two of the band's recordings have been released, Gammeldans, recorded in 1978-79, and Knågstykker, recorded in 1965 and 1969.
