= Frederik Iversen =

Danish musician (1864–1948)

Frederik Iversen (1864–1948) was a Danish traditional musician and composer. He became famous through the dances he held in from 1912 to 1939 at his restaurant Trædballehus west of Vejle, in Western Jutland. He played the clarinet and fiddle and composed many of the tunes that are now the stock of Danish traditional music, such as his famous version of "trædballehus polka" (which he probably adapted from other local fiddlers). At Trædballehus he performed with his musical partner the fiddler Jens Andersen, and the duo achieved national fame, with the Danish National Radio even transmitting live from some of their dances.
