= Härjedalspipa =

The härjedalspipa is a Swedish traditional fipple flute, similar to the spilåpipa with a slightly softer sound and only six finger holes. The model originated in Härjedalen, hence the name, and the most recognized traditional bearer of the instrument was Olof Jönsson (1867–1953), called Ol'Jansa, in Överberg, Härjedalen. The method of manufacture was preserved thanks to Oskar Olofsson in Lillhärdal, who passed his knowledge on to Gunnar Stenmark in Ås. Stenmark is today the most recognized maker of the instrument.

The traditional Härjedalspipa is made from spruce and tuned in the key of A# at the bottom (all six finger holes covered). The scale includes some blue notes, in particular the third, sixth and seventh which are flat by 20–25 cents compared to the equal temperament scale. Today, instruments are made also in other keys and temperaments.

== Musicians on härjedalspipa ==
- Ale Möller
- Göran Månsson
- Gunnar Stenmark
