= Tobo =

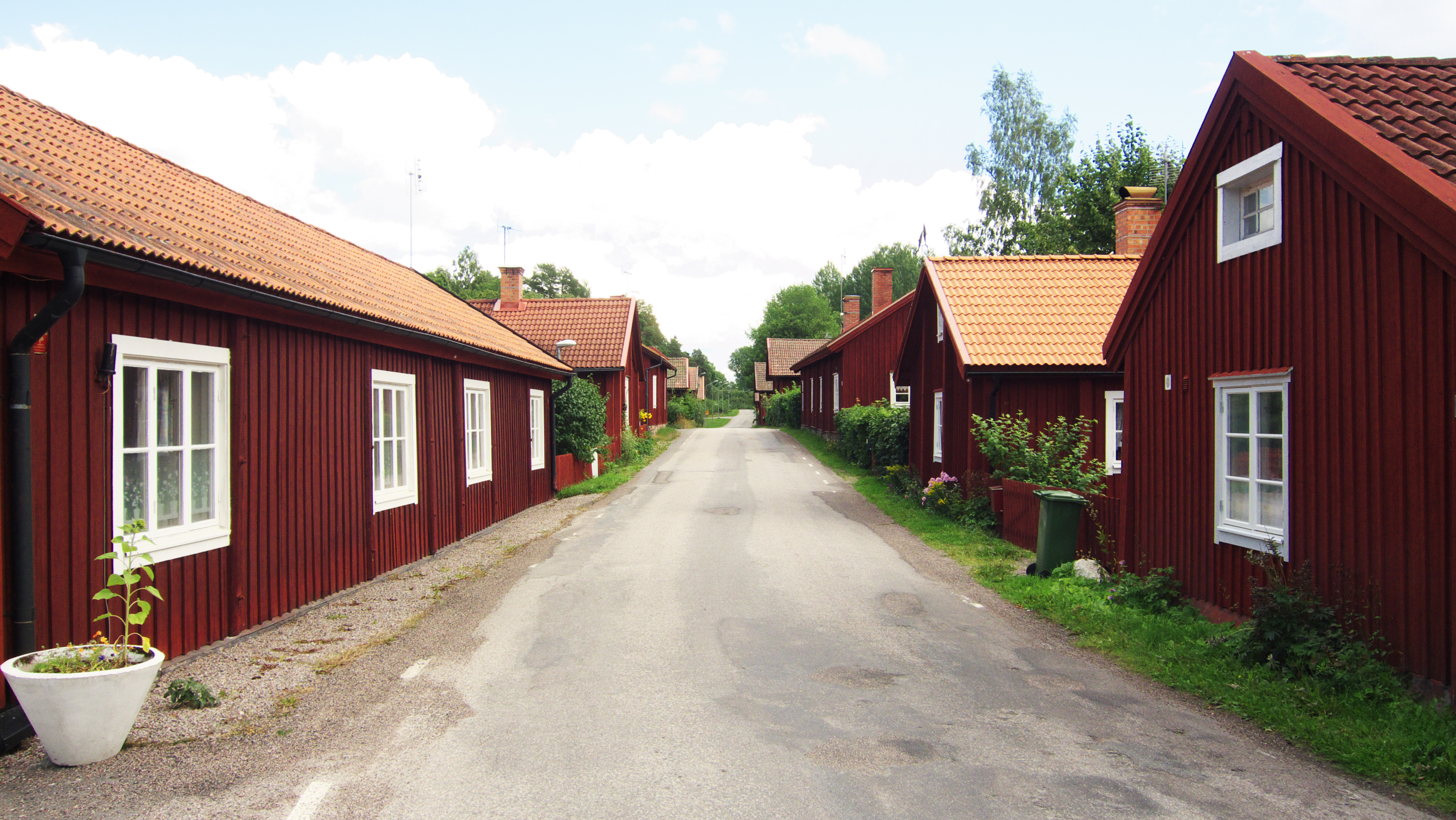
- Street in Tobo

- Location within Uppsala Location within Sweden
- Coordinates: 60°16′N 17°39′E
- Country: Sweden
- Province: Uppland
- County: Uppsala County
- Municipality: Tierp Municipality

Area
  - Total: 1.03 km^{2} (0.40 sq mi)

Population (31 December 2020)
  - Total: 673
  - Density: 653/km^{2} (1,690/sq mi)
- Time zone: UTC+1 (CET)
  - Summer (DST): UTC+2 (CEST)

Tobo is a locality situated in Tierp Municipality, Uppsala County, Sweden with 595 inhabitants in 2018.
