= Riksspelman =

Badge of mastery for Swedish folk musicians

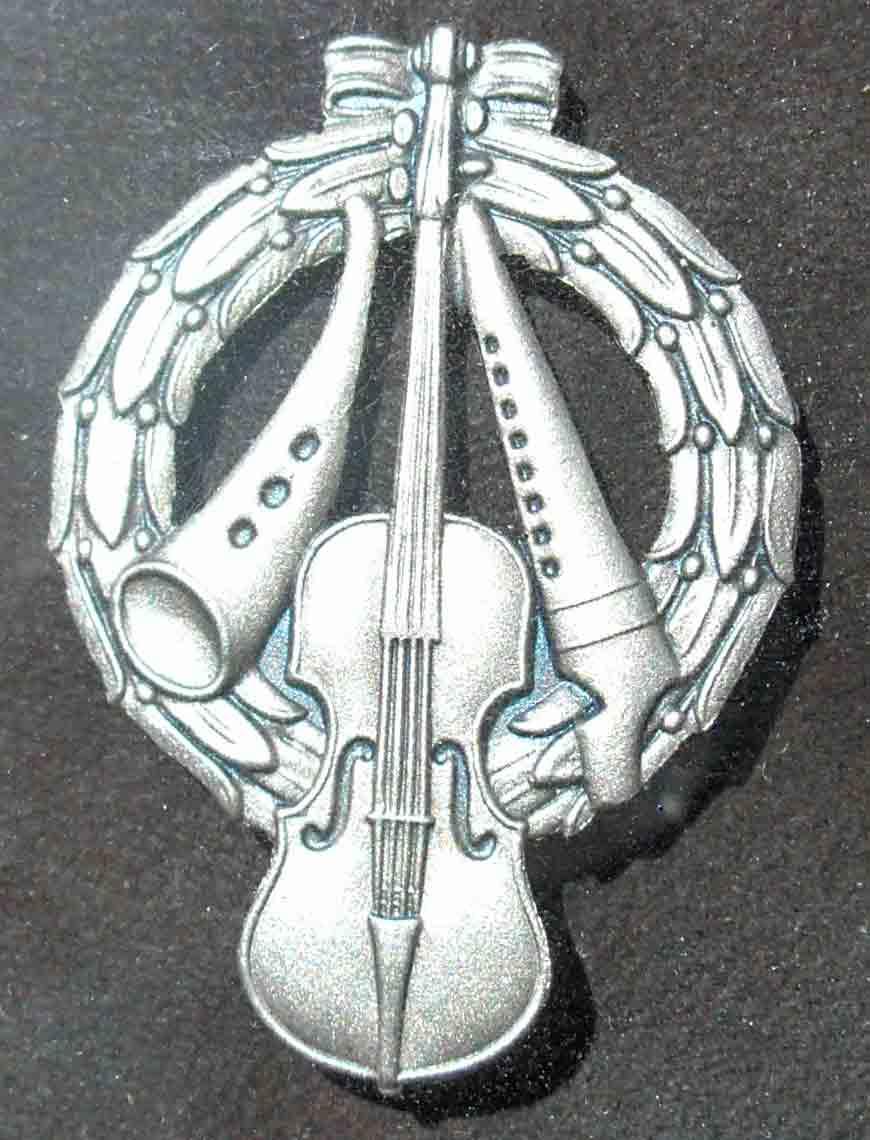
The Silver Zorn Badge, designed by Anders Zorn (1860–1920)

The title of riksspelman (Swedish: [ˈrɪ̂ksˌspeːlman], National Spelman) is a generally recognized badge of mastery for Swedish folk musicians. It is an honor bestowed upon bearers of the silver or gold Zorn Badge, awarded annually by the Zorn Jury, a panel of experts under the auspices of Svenska Folkdansringen. The silver Zorn Badge is the highest award attainable for musicians who play before the Zorn Jury in their annual Zorn Trials. (Other possible awards include a certificate, bronze Zorn Badge, and post-bronze certificate.) The gold Zorn Badge cannot be sought, but is reserved for one or two master musicians pre-selected by the Jury.

Since the creation of the riksspelman title in 1933, it has been awarded to an average of ten people per year. Sweden today has approximately 300 living riksspelmän. Since 2013 Denmark has a corresponding title of rigsspillemand, which has been bestowed on 23 musicians who play Danish traditional music.

== Etymology ==
In 1910, a national folk musicians' gathering (riksspelmansstämma) was called at Skansen, Stockholm's open-air museum of Swedish folk culture. A number of musicians were invited to play; the 65 who heeded the call were all awarded a silver badge designed and financed by the painter Anders Zorn.

Later, in 1933, Svenska Ungdomsringen för bygdekultur (The Swedish Youth Ring for Village Culture) created a system by which folk musicians could play music before a jury of experts. Various awards for the participants of these Trials would be handed out at an annual "National Folk Musicians' Gathering," a name taken from that original event in 1910. The highest award for participants in the trials would be that same silver badge designed by Anders Zorn. Those who received this highest honor would be known as riksspelmän.

In other words, while the name of the event was taken from that initial gathering in 1910, the meaning was changed in 1933. In 1910, the national folk musicians' gathering was a National Gathering of Folk Musicians. In 1933, it became a Gathering of National Folk Musicians (riksspelmän).

== The Zorn Jury ==
The Zorn Jury (Swedish: Zornjuryn) is made up of nine members. When a member retires, the jury selects a new member, subject to the approval of Svenska Folkdansringen. Generally, the jury is made up of folk musicians with a great deal of experience and knowledge, most of whom are also riksspelmän. One position on the Jury may also be held by a scholar, whose primary credentials are academic. As of 2016, the current jury members are: Jan Burman, Verf-Lena Egardt, Christina Frohm, Wille Grindsäter, Pers Nils Johansson, Krister Malm, Cajsa Ekstav, Peter Pedersen, and Tony Wrethling.

== The Zorn Trials ==
In any given year, three members of the Zorn Jury are selected to adjudicate the week-long Zorn Trials (Zornmärkesuppspelningarna). The trials are always held during the summer months, each year in a different location in Sweden. A local representative is appointed as a fourth adjudicator. Each participant in the trials is given a fifteen-minute time slot, and asked to play three to five tunes for the jury. The trials are closed to the public, but are recorded by Svenskt Visarkiv (The Centre for Swedish Folk Music and Jazz Research) for posterity. The results are posted at the end of each Trial day, and the awards are distributed at the National Folk Musicians' Gathering (riksspelmansstämman) at the end of the week.

== Criteria ==
The adjudicators judge participants on four criteria: rhythm, technique, intonation, and "qualities as a folk musician" (egenskaper som spelman). The fourth criterion relates to stylistic authenticity in musical expression, and is weighted more heavily than the other three. Also of import is that participants in the trials demonstrate mastery over a single regional tradition. Attempting to play tunes from multiple different regions never results in a silver badge.

== Eligibility ==
The Zorn Trials are open to musicians aged sixteen and older. Few receive the silver badge on their first try, however. Notable exceptions include Marie Stensby (1975), Åsa Jinder (1979), and Jeanette Eriksson (2002), all of whom became riksspelmän at age sixteen.

Only players of instruments regarded as "traditional" may play for the Zorn Jury. There is no official list of traditional instruments, however. Musicians who apply for a time slot before the jury are simply rejected if they list an instrument that the adjudicators regard as non-traditional. Instruments that have been accepted in the past include: fiddle, chromatic nyckelharpa, silverbasharpa, kontrabasharpa, clarinet, durspel, harmonica, kulning, spilåpipa, härjedalspipa, träskofiol, travers, hummel, näverlapp, cow horn, näverlur, and Swedish bagpipes. It is permissible to play multiple instruments for the Jury.

There are no restrictions with regard to nationality. Currently, at least six non-Swedes hold the title: Kristian Daugaard Madsen (Denmark, 1982), Oline Bakkom-Härdelin (Norway, 1996), Emma Reid (England, 2006), David Kaminsky (United States, 2007), Amy Hakanson (United States, 2025), and Lirica Maeda (Japan, 2026).

Musicians who are already riksspelmän are not eligible to participate in the Zorn Trials.

== Common Misunderstandings ==
Folk musicians are occasionally credited with being riksspelmän erroneously. In some cases, these are musicians who have been granted lesser awards by the Zorn jury (a certificate or bronze Zorn Badge). In other cases, they are well-known folk musicians who people simply assume are riksspelmän. The main reason behind these misunderstandings is that the title of riksspelman is far better known than are the official mechanisms and processes that grant it.

== Controversy ==
The authority and expertise of the Zorn Jury, which awards the Zorn Badge, is generally accepted within the Swedish folk music community. The controversy associated with the system generally relates to the question of which instruments are regarded as traditional, and thus approved for judgment by the jury. Many argue that no such limitations should exist, the argument being that "it's not what you play, but how you play." Others push for the acceptance of certain specific instruments. The best-known case in which such a movement succeeded resulted in the jury's allowance of the diatonic button accordion (durspel) for the first time in 1979. A long-term movement pushing for the acceptance of trall, or vocable singing, resulted in the acceptance of that instrument for the first time in 2025.

Another controversy regards the word spelman (literally "play-man") itself, given the growing number of female spelmän and riksspelmän in Sweden.

== See also ==
- Zorn Badge
- Spelman (music)
- Swedish folk music
- Spelmanslag
