= Swedish folk music =

Folk music tradition of Sweden

Swedish folk music is a genre of music based largely on folkloric collection work that began in the early 19th century in Sweden. The primary instrument of Swedish folk music is the fiddle. Another common instrument, unique to Swedish traditions, is the nyckelharpa. Most Swedish instrumental folk music is dance music; the signature music and dance form within Swedish folk music is the polska. Vocal and instrumental traditions in Sweden have tended to share tunes historically, though they have been performed separately. Beginning with the folk music revival of the 1970s, vocalists and instrumentalists have also begun to perform together in folk music ensembles.

== History ==
The history of Swedish folk music collection began with the formation of an organization called the Gothic Society (Götiska Förbundet) in 1811, shortly after the establishment of Sweden as a modern constitutional monarchy in 1809. The first published transcription of a Swedish folk tune came out in their journal Iduna in 1813. The men of the Gothic Society were primarily interested in collecting the oldest materials they could find among the peasants of the Swedish countryside. Collection in the 19th century largely followed this model; the music was generally arranged for performance by people whose primary background was in art music.

In the early 1890s, the first "public" performances of Swedish folk music by actual spelmän (folk musicians) were held at Skansen, Stockholm's open-air museum of Swedish folklife. The first Swedish spelman contest was held in 1906, and the first national gathering of Swedish spelmän in 1910. Over time, the contests began to fade, and the less formal gatherings became the primary venue for Swedish folk musicians to interact with one another. Instrumental folk music was still primarily a solo tradition during the first half of the 20th century, and the best-known players were virtuosic fiddlers from the province of Hälsingland.

In the 1940s, the first spelmanslag, or amateur folk music groups, were established, associated primarily with the music of Dalarna. The first major recording project for Swedish folk music was also launched in the late 1940s. Some of the most popular recordings were of spelmanslag in Dalarna, and during the 1950s the spelmanslag phenomenon spread throughout the country.

The beginnings of the folk music revival could already be seen in the mid-1960s, influenced by albums such as Jan Johansson's Jazz på svenska ("Jazz in Swedish") released in 1962 (EP) and 1964 (LP). The movement gained momentum in 1970 in the aftermath of Gärdesfesten, Sweden's answer to Woodstock.

Elsewhere during the 1960s and 1970s, rock and pop musicians began adapting Swedish folk music into their own compositions. The 1967 album Studio by Tages along with subsequent singles "There's a Blind Man Playin' Fiddle in the Street" and "Fantasy Island" from 1968 were amongst the first rock recordings blending the genres.

In the years since, Swedish folk music has once again receded into a subcultural niche, but the revival has effected a number of changes. These include the addition of a number of new instruments (saxophone, flute, tambourine, guitar, and mandola, to name a few) as well as some revived instruments (e.g. Swedish bagpipe, hurdy-gurdy, and härjedalspipa). The inclusion of these instruments has meant the invention of new forms of ensemble music (given that Swedish folk music had previously been primarily a solo melody tradition). A polska dance revival, beginning in the early 1980s, has meant new contexts for the music to be played in. Swedish folk music has entered the educational system at all levels; musicians are becoming more and more skilled at ever-younger ages.

== See also ==
- List of Swedish folk musicians
- Spelman (music)
- Riksspelman
- Spelmanslag
- Polska (dance)
- Traditional Nordic dance music
- Music of Sweden
- Sveriges Medeltida Ballader
