= Tack & farväl =

Compilation album by Thorleifs
- Released: November 14, 2012
- Recorded: 1973–2012
- Genre: dansband music
- Length: 2 hours, 31 minutes
- Label: Warner Music Sweden

Thorleifs chronology
Golden Sax Love Songs (2011)	Tack & farväl (2012)	Golden Sax Swing (2014)

Tack & farväl was released on 14 November 2012 and is a Thorleifs double compilation album in connection to the band disestablishment the same year. The opening track, Déjà vu, was new-written by Thomas G:son. That song was originally written for Melodifestivalen 2008., where Thorleifs were originally intended to participate.

== Track listing ==
=== CD 1 ===
1. "Déjà vu"
2. "En liten ängel"
3. "Sweet Kissin' in the Moonlight"
4. "Att glömma är inte så enkelt"
5. "Halva mitt hjärta"
6. "En dag i juni" ("Safe in My Garden")
7. "Flyg bort min fågel"
8. "Sway" (instrumental)
9. "Skänk mig dina tankar"
10. "Blue Blue Moon"
11. "Nu kommer tårarna igen"
12. "Rosor doftar alltid bättre när det skymmer"
13. "Och du tände stjärnorna"
14. "Raka rör (och ös till bäng)"
15. "Ingen torkar längre tåren på min kind"
16. "Gråt inga tårar"
17. "Det ska komma en morgon"
18. "Du gav mig kärlek"
19. "My Heart Will Go On" (instrumental)
20. "Kurragömma"
21. "Farväl"
22. "Skicka mig ett vykort"
23. "Krama mig igen"

=== CD 2 ===
1. "Spar dina tårar"
2. "Upp till dans"
3. "Med dig vill jag leva"
4. "Ner mot havet"
5. "Du bara du"
6. "Sköt om dig väl"
7. "Tusen vita syrener"
8. "Till Folkets park"
9. "Ingen får mig att längta som du"
10. "När jag behövde dig mest"
11. "Ett litet ristat hjärta"
12. "Forever and Ever" (instrumental)
13. "Fem röda rosor till dig"
14. "Aldrig nånsin"
15. "Gröna blad"
16. "Se mig i ögonen"
17. "Förälskade"
18. "Ingen är som du min kära"
19. "Älskar du mig än som förr"
20. "Ring en signal"
21. "I ett fotoalbum"
22. "En liten bit av himlen"
23. Tre gringos (with Just D)

== Charts ==
Chart (2012)	Peak position
Sweden (Sverigetopplistan)	4
