= Thorleifs Hit Collection =

Compilation album by Thorleifs
- Released: 21 January 2002
- Recorded: 1974–2002
- Genre: dansband music
- Label: Mariann

Thorleifs chronology
| Mit dir will ich leben (2002) | Thorleifs Hit Collection (2002) | Våra bästa år (2007) |

Thorleifs Hit Collection is a 2002 Thorleifs double compilation album. At the album charts, it peaked at 42nd position in Sweden.

The compilation was released for the band's 40th anniversary, and many of the oldest songs are rerecordings from the 1995 compilation Historien Thorleifs.

== Track listing ==
=== CD 1 ===
1. Att glömma är inte så enkelt (Vår enda sommar)
2. Och du tände stjärnorna
3. Rosor doftar alltid som mest när det skymmer
4. Jag dansar med en ängel
5. Tack, min vän
6. Följ mig
7. Flyg bort min fågel
8. Forever and ever
9. Ring en signal
10. Gråt inga tårar
11. Tre gringos (Thorleifs & Just D)
12. Raka rör (och ös till bäng)
13. Med dig vill jag leva
14. Älska mig
15. Oh Josefine, Josefine
16. En liten ängel

=== CD 2 ===
1. Dina nära och kära
2. Gröna blad
3. Kurragömma
4. My Heart Will Go On
5. Halva mitt hjärta
6. En dag i juni (Safe in My Garden)
7. Swing'n Rock-medley
8. Krama mig igen
9. Skänk mig dina tankar
10. Genom skogar över ängar
11. Don't Cry for Me Argentina
12. Ingen får mig att längta som du
13. Jag vill ge dig en sång
14. Fem röda rosor till dig
15. Till Folkets Park
16. Liebst du mich wohl immer noch (Älskar du mig än, som förr)

== Charts ==
| Chart (2002) | Peak position |
|---|---|
| Sweden (Sverigetopplistan) | 42 |
