= Våra bästa år =

Compilation album by Thorleifs
- Released: October 3, 2007
- Recorded: 1970–2007
- Genre: dansband music
- Label: Warner Music Sweden

Thorleifs chronology
Thorleifs Hit Collection (2002)	Våra bästa år (2007)	Förälskade (2008)

Våra bästa år is a 2007 Thorleifs double compilation album. Seven of the songs were new back then. Outside Sweden, special versions of the album were released in Denmark, Finland and Norway. On the album charts, it peaked at 24th position in Denmark, and 7th position in Sweden.

== Track listing ==
=== CD 1 ===
1. "Våra bästa år"
2. "Skicka mig ett vykort"
3. "Varenda gång"
4. "Låt mig bli din egen ängel"
5. "Med dej vill jag leva"
6. "Rosor doftar alltid som mest (när det skymmer)"
7. "Till Folkets park"
8. "Andante, Andante" (instrumental)
9. "Du, bara du"
10. "Kurragömma"
11. "Gråt inga tårar"
12. "Aldrig nå'nsin (glömmer jag dig)"
13. "Farväl"
14. "En liten ängel"
15. "The Night Has a Thousand Eyes"
16. "Att glömma är inte så enkelt"
17. "Spar dina tårar"
18. "Tre gringos"
19. "Ring en signal"
20. "Gröna blad"
21. "Om du lämnar mig"
22. "Chattanooga Choo Choo"

=== CD 2 ===
1. "Vi ses igen"
2. "Sakna och aldrig glömma"
3. "Gång efter gång"
4. "Och du tände stjärnorna"
5. "En dag i juni" ("Safe in My Garden")
6. "Nu kommer tårarna igen"
7. "Genom skogar över ängar"
8. "Skänk mig dina tankar"
9. "Only You"
10. "Älskar du mig än som förr"
11. "Drömmarnas tid är förbi"
12. "Ingen får mig att längta som du"
13. "Raka rör (och ös till bäng)"
14. "Kärleken skall vinna"
15. "The Last Farewell" (instrumental)
16. "Kommer hem till dig"
17. "Fem röda rosor"
18. "Ner mot havet" ("You Want Love")
19. "Det sa bom bom i mitt hjärta"
20. "Du gav mig kärlek"
21. "I Mexicos land" ("South of the Border") (bonus)
22. "Ra-Ta-Ta" (bonus)

== Charts ==
Chart (2007–2008)	Peak position
Denmark	24
Sweden	7
