= Golden Sax Swing =

Compilation album by Thorleifs
- Released: October 15, 2014
- Recorded: 1983–2014
- Genre: Dansband music, schlager
- Label: Mariann
- Producer: Thomas Thörnholm, Thorleif Torstensson, Lasse Westmann, Anders Henriksson

Thorleifs chronology
Tack & farväl (2012)	Golden Sax Swing (2014)

Golden Sax Swing is a compilation album by Thorleifs released in October 2014. The album mostly consists of older material However, 12 of the songs were recorded during mid-2014, two years after the official band disestablishment in mid-2012.

== Track listing ==
1. "Vi möts igen" ("We'll Meet Again")
2. "ABBA medley"
  1. "Waterloo"
  2. "Mamma Mia"
  3. "Ring Ring"
  4. "Super Trouper"
  5. "Money, Money, Money"
3. "Who's Sorry Now?"
4. "Alice Babs medley"
  1. "Swing it, magistern!"
  2. "Alice i Tyrolen"
  3. "Sugartime"
  4. "Vårat gäng"
  5. "Stigbergsgatan 8"
5. "Du är min man"
6. "Chattanooga Choo Choo"
7. "Beatles medley"
  1. "She Loves Me"
  2. "Can't Buy Me Love"
  3. "All My Loving"
  4. "Eight Days a Week"
  5. "Tell Me Why"
  6. "With a Little Help from My Friends"
8. "Swing Cat"
9. "Morgen"
10. "Wake Me Up Before You Go-Go"
11. "Swing 'n' Rock Medley"
  1. "In the Mood"
  2. "Bye Bye Blackbird"
  3. "American Patrol"
  4. "A String of Pearls"
  5. "Take the "A" Train"
  6. "Rock Around the Clock"
  7. "Blue Suede Shoes"
  8. "See You Later, Alligator"
  9. "Chattanooga Choo Choo"
12. "What You're Proposing"

== Charts ==
Chart (2014)	Peak position
Sweden (Sverigetopplistan)	10
