= Det här är bara början =

Studio album by Elisa's
- Released: 9 February 2011
- Genre: Dansband music
- Label: Kavalkad
- Producer: Henrik Sethsson

Elisa's chronology
| Det här är bara början (2011) | Det sa klick! (2012) |

Det här är bara början is the debut studio album by Elisa's. It was released on 9 February 2011, which included a free-entrance concert at Nya torget in Mariestad. The album topped the Swedish album chart on 18 February 2011. It was also certified gold in Sweden.

== Track listing ==
| # | Title | Writer | Length |
|---|---|---|---|
| 1. | "Om du säger att du älskar mig" | Henrik Sethsson, Kent Liljefjäll, Ulf Georgsson | 2.53 |
| 2. | "Utan dina andetag" | Joakim Berg | 3.22 |
| 3. | "För det här är bara början" | Lasse Holm | 3.10 |
| 4. | "Gråt inga tårar" | Åke Hallgren | 2.48 |
| 5. | "Varenda veranda" | Pontus Wennerberg, Måns Zelmerlöw | 2.45 |
| 6. | "Human" | Brandon Flowers, Dave Keuning, Ronnie Vannucci | 3.12 |
| 7. | "Säg inte nej!" | Sarah Dawn Finer, Peter Hallström | 3.07 |
| 8. | "Lovar och svär" | Kent Liljefjäll, Henrik Sethsson, Thomas G:sson | 2.53 |
| 9. | "Vågar också du tro på kärleken" | Ulf Georgsson, Tomas Edström | 3.14 |
| 10. | "Leende guldbruna ögon" ("Beautiful Brown Eyes") | Trad. Arr., Olle Bergman | 2.55 |
| 11. | "Jag väntar här" | Karl-Ola Kjellholm, Jimmy Jansson | 3.07 |
| 12. | "När du vaknar är jag hos dig" | Lars Berghagen, Tage Borgmästars, Thomas Enroth | 3.00 |
| 13. | "En stjärna föll för oss" | Kent Liljefjäll, Lotta Liljefjäll, Henrik Sethsson | 3.37 |
| 14. | "Tusen och en natt" | Lars "Dille" Diedricson, Gert Lengstrand | 2.54 |

== Contributors ==
- Elisa Lindström – vocals, trumpet
- Markus Frykén – guitar
- Petter Ferneman – bass, accordion
- Robert Lundh – keyboards
- Daniel Wallin – drums

== Charts ==
| Chart (2011) | Peak position |
|---|---|
| Swedish Albums (Sverigetopplistan) | 1 |
