= Plast (disambiguation) =

Plast is the largest Scouting organization in Ukraine.

Plast may also refer to:

- Plast (town), a town in Chelyabinsk Oblast, Russia
- Plast (Pláhnetan album), album by the Icelandic band Pláhnetan
- Plast (album), a 1995 album by the Swedish hip hop group Just D

== See also ==
- Plas
- Plaster
- Plastic (disambiguation)
