= Bosse Skoglund =

Swedish musician (1936–2021)

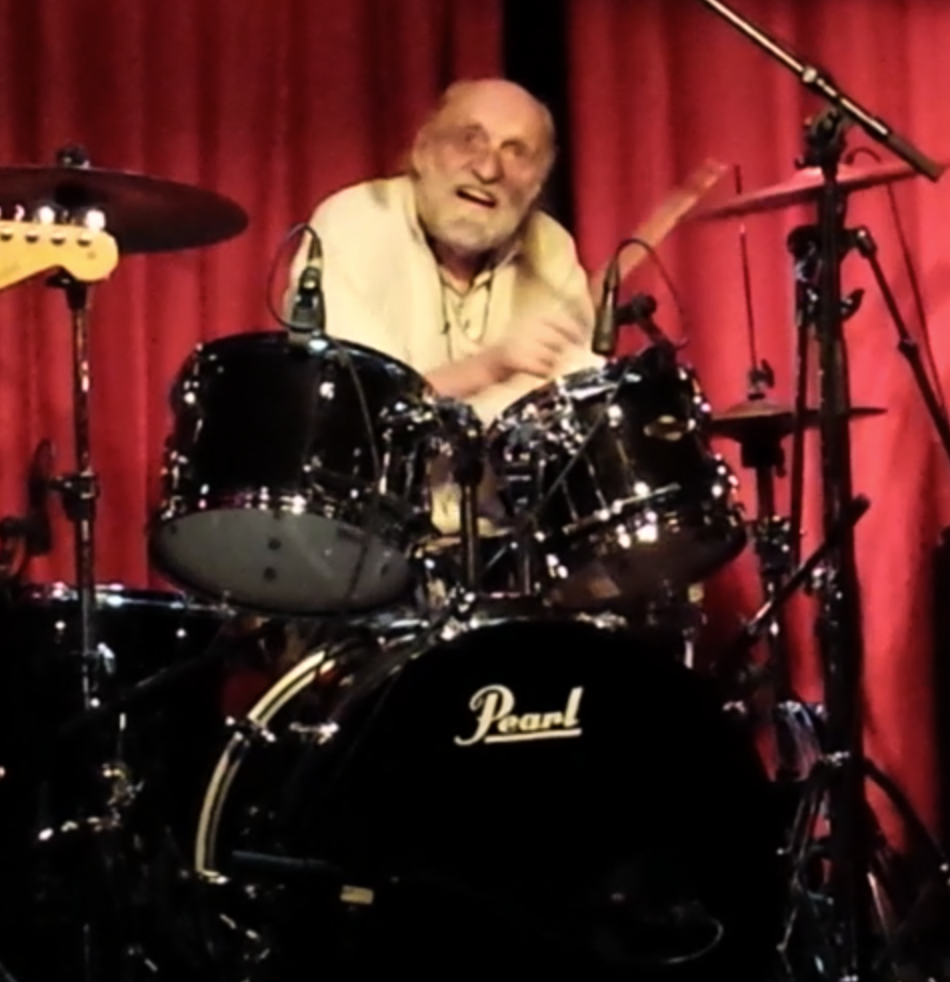
- Bosse Skoglund playing the drums at Fasching in Stockholm in October 2013

Background information
- Instrument: percussion

Bo Åke Skoglund, best known as Bosse Skoglund, (10 April 1936 – 10 April 2021) was a Swedish musician, drummer and percussionist.

Skoglund appeared as a musician in the songs Varm korv boogie, Tunna skivor and Klas-Göran.
