= Thorleifs jul =

Studio album by Thorleifs
- Released: November 23, 1998
- Recorded: Strängnäs Cathedral, Strängnäs, Sweden
- Genre: Christmas, dansband music
- Label: TV4 Vision
- Producer: Lasse Westmann, Thorleif Torstensson

Thorleifs chronology
En liten ängel - Live i Lillehammer (1997)	Thorleifs jul (1998)	Thorleifs karaoke (1998)

Thorleifs jul is a 1998 Thorleifs Christmas album. The album was recorded inside the Strängnäs Cathedral for TV4 Vision, and peaked at 45th position on the Swedish albums chart.

== Track listing ==
1. Jul, jul, strålande jul
2. Nu tändas tusen juleljus
3. Gläns över sjö och strand
4. O helga natt (Cantique de noël)
5. Låt mig få tända ett ljus (Schlafe mein Prinzchen)
6. Gemenskapens jul
7. Jag drömmer om en jul hemma (White Christmas)
8. När det lider mot jul (Det strålar en stjärna)
9. Ser du stjärnan i det blå (When You Wish upon a Star)
10. Julen är nära
11. När juldagsmorgon glimmar
12. Stilla natt (Stille Nacht, heilige Nacht)
13. Ett barn är fött på denna dag

== Charts ==
Chart (1994)	Peak position
Sweden (Sverigetopplistan)	45
