= En gnistrande jul =

Studio album by Elisa's
- Released: November 13, 2013
- Genre: Christmas, dansband music
- Label: Lionheart

Elisa's chronology
Be mig! Se mig! Ge mig! (2013)	En gnistrande jul (2013)	Det ska va lätt (2014)

En gnistrande jul is a 2013 Elisa's Christmas album.

== Track listing ==
1. Jag drömmer om en jul hemma (White Christmas)
2. Låt mig få tända ett ljus (Mozart's lullaby)
3. I Wish It Could Be Christmas Everyday
4. Dagen då snön försvann
5. När det lider mot jul
6. Feliz Navidad
7. En ensam jul
8. Gnistrande kristall
9. Santa Lucia
10. Tomten ska dansa
11. Våran första jul
12. Oh helga natt (Cantique de Noël)
13. Christmas Is Here

== Charts ==
Chart (2013)	Peak position
Sweden (Sverigetopplistan)	8
