= Kommer hem till dig =

Studio album by Thorleifs
- Released: 1973; 25 July 1996 (rerelease)
- Genre: dansband music
- Length: circa 33 minutes
- Label: Platina

Thorleifs chronology
| Kommer hem till dig (1973) | En dag i juni (1974) |

Kommer hem till dig is a 1973 Thorleifs studio album and the band's debut album. In 1996, the album was rereleased to CD and cassette tape on the Golden Line label.

== Track listing ==
1. "Kommer hem till dig"
2. "Jolly Bob"
3. "Vilken härlig dag" ("Save Your Heart for Me")
4. "Loop de la" ("Dirlada")
5. "Är du ensam nu" ("Shine Girl")
6. "Wonderland by Night" ("Wunderland bei Nacht")
7. "Blå löften" ("Blue Winter")
8. "Maggan" ("When Jo Jo Runs")
9. "En kväll hos dig" ("One Night")
10. "Vem hittar på (allt det där vi lyssnar på)"
11. "En värld utan kärlek" ("A World Without Love")
12. "Ditt liv" ("Noah")
