= En dag i juni (album) =

Studio album by Thorleifs
- Released: 1974; 25 July 1996 (rerelease)
- Genre: dansband music
- Length: 35 minutes
- Label: Platina

Thorleifs chronology
Kommer hem till dig (1973)	En dag i juni (1974)	Gråt inga tårar (1975)

En dag i juni is a 1974 Thorleifs studio album In 1996, the album was rereleased to CD and cassette tape on the Golden Line label.

The album became the first by Thorleifs to sell gold.

== Track listing ==
1. "Det ding-dong bultar och ringer"
2. "En dag i juni" ("Safe in My Garden")
3. "Det är sol vi behöver"
4. "Du tillhör mig"
5. "En äkta rock'n roll"
6. "Amazing Grace"
7. "Det är det bästa jag har"
8. "Krama mig igen"
9. "Svärmeri i månsken"
10. "Da Doo Ron Ron"
11. "Jag vill ha dig"
12. "Min lägenhet den vill jag ha igen" ("I'm Gonna Knock on Your Door")
