= Det sa klick! =

2012 album by Elisa's

Studio album by Elisa's
- Released: 25 January 2012
- Genre: Dansband music
- Label: Lionheart
- Producer: Henrik Sethsson

Elisa's chronology
Det här är bara början (2011)	Det sa klick! (2012)	Be mig! Se mig! Ge mig! (2013)

Det sa klick! is a 2012 studio album by Elisa's.

== Track listing ==
#	Title	Writer	Length
1.	"Jag säger som det är"	Henrik Sethsson, Thomas G:son, Kent Liljefjäll	2.48
2.	"When You Walk in the Room"	Jackie DeShannon	3.14
3.	"I kväll tar jag chansen"	Claes Linder, Kent Liljefjäll, Elisa Lidström, Henrik Sethsson	3.08
4.	"Jag tror på kärleken"	Thomas Berglund, Ulf Georgsson, Tobias Nyström	3.27
5.	"Ingen kan älska mig som du"	Mats Larsson, Åsa Karlsson	3.03
6.	"Är det på riktigt eller drömmer jag?"	Kent Liljefjäll, Ulf Georgsson, Henrik Sethsson	3.28
7.	"Det sa klick!!"	Thomas G:son, Henrik Sethsson	2.53
8.	"Breaking Up is Hard to Do"	Neil Sedaka, Howard Greenfield	2.24
9.	"Rose Garden"	Joe South	3.10
10.	"I min ensamhet"	Jimmy Jansson	3.17
11.	"Linjen i min hand"	Thomas G:son, Henrik Sethsson	3.00
12.	"När dina läppar möter mina"	Elisa Lindström, Kent Liljefjäll, Henrik Sethsson	3.23

== Contributors ==
- Elisa Lindström – Vocals, trumpet
- Markus Frykén – guitar
- Robert Lundh – keyboards
- Daniel Wallin – drums
- Petter Ferneman – bass, accordion

== Charts ==
=== Weekly charts ===
Chart (2012)	Peak position
Swedish Albums (Sverigetopplistan)	4

=== Year-end charts ===
Chart (2012)	Position
Swedish Albums (Sverigetopplistan)	38
