= Förälskade =

Studio album by Thorleifs
- Released: October 1, 2008
- Recorded: Meat Studio, Västerås, Sweden/Skeda Studio, Norrhult, Sweden
- Genre: dansband music
- Length: 47 minutes
- Label: Warner Music Sweden
- Producer: Thorleif Torstensson, Thomas Thörnholm

Thorleifs chronology
Våra bästa år (2007)	Förälskade (2008)	Sweet Kissin' in the Moonlight: Den första kyssen (2009)

Förälskade is a studio album by Thorleifs, released 1 October 2008. On the album charts, it topped in Sweden, reached 17th position in Denmark and 34th position in Norway. A Danish language-version of the album, Forelskede, was also recorded.

The song "Ingen torkar längre tåren på min kind" is a cover version of Swedish country artist Ingela Söderlund.

== Track listing ==
1. "Jag tänder ett ljus"
2. "Det är bara himmelen"
3. "Utanför min dörr"
4. "Förälskade"
5. "Ingen torkar längre tåren på min kind"
6. "Dina blåa ögon"
7. "Innan höstlöven faller"
8. "Dagen som förändrade mitt liv"
9. "Blue Blue Moon"
10. "Om du var här hos mig"
11. "Lyckliga gatan" ("Il ragazzo della via Gluck")
12. "I Have a Dream" (instrumental)
13. "Ingen av oss"
14. "Kärlekens hus" ("Living in a House Full of Love") (bonus track)
15. "Lite av din tid, lite av din kärlek" (bonus track)

== Contributors ==
- Thorleifs - musicians
- Conny Olsson - guitar
- Mats Wikman - guitar
- Thorleif Torstensson, Thomas Thörnholm - producers

== Charts ==
Chart (2008–2009)	Peak position
Denmark (Tracklisten)	17
Norway (VG-lista)	22
Sweden (Sverigetopplistan)	1
