= The One for You =

1965 single by Tages

Single by Tages

from the album Tages
- B-side: "I Got My Mojo Working"
- Released: 15 August 1965
- Recorded: 5 August 1965
- Studio: Europafilm, Stockholm
- Genre: Hard rock
- Length: 2:34
- Label: Platina
- Songwriter(s): Danne Larsson
- Producer(s): Anders Henriksson

Tages singles chronology
"Don't Turn Your Back" (1965)	"The One for You" (1965)	"Bloodhound" (1965)

Audio
- "The One For You" on YouTube

"The One for You" is a song written by Swedish guitarist Danne Larsson and recorded by his group Tages in 1965. Following an intensive tour of the Sweden, while also previously having composed songs for the band, Larsson wrote the song inspired by their trip to London, allegedly about a girl he had met there. It was the first recording by Tages produced by Anders Henriksson, who would come to produce the majority of their coming output, along with being their first single recorded at Europafilm Studios in Bromma, Stockholm.

Released by Platina Records on 15 August 1965, the song was backed by a rendition of the Muddy Waters standard "I Got My Mojo Working" as the group's fourth single release. In November of that year, the single was included on their debut album, Tages, and has appeared on multiple compilation albums of the band's music. Lyrically, the song tackles the subject of love from a narrator's perspective.

Upon release, "The One for You" received warm reviews in the Swedish music press, who noted the apparent change in genres, praising the hard rock sound. American guitarist Chuck Berry's appraisal of the song in an issue of Bildjournalen gave Tages confidence. Though it was a large commercial success in Sweden, reaching the top-10 on the music charts Tio i Topp and Kvällstoppen, it underperformed in the charts compared to their earlier singles. Retrospectively, the song has been considered one of the group's best singles, with many critics noting the musical style.

== Background ==
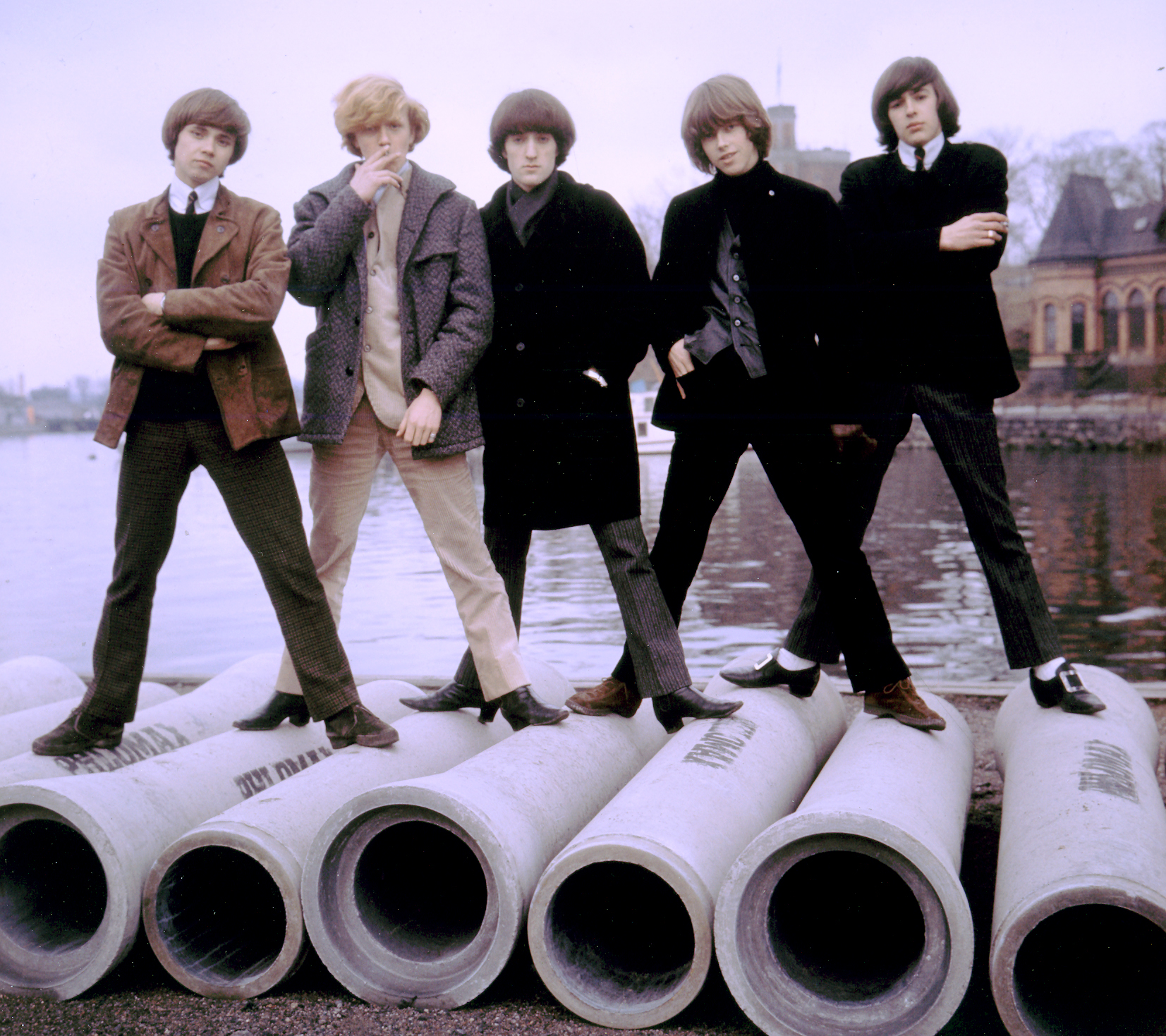
Tages during the spring of 1965, prior to their hectic summer tour.

During the first half of 1965, Tages had achieved commercial success with the three singles they had released up until that point; "Sleep Little Girl" (1964), "I Should Be Glad" and "Don't Turn Your Back" (both 1965), of which the first reached number one on Tio i Topp for a week, while the two others also saw success on Tio i Topp and Kvällstoppen. All three had one thing in common; they were all melodically soft rock songs largely driven by acoustic guitars with only occasional electric guitar during the guitar solos. They were also largely based on contemporary songs by pop acts the Searchers and Gerry and the Pacemakers. Though "Sleep Little Girl" had been "savagely criticized in the Swedish press", both "I Should Be Glad" and "Don't Turn Your Back" had received favourable reviews.

Because of these successful singles, Tages had developed a following which the media would compare to Beatlemania, taking a toll on the member's health as they were still in school at the time. The group members songwriting abilities were also rapidly developing in favour of rhythm and blues based music inspired by their idols such as Muddy Waters and John Lee Hooker. Though the A-sides of their singles had been soft melodic rock, the B-sides were by contrast focused on rhythm and blues.

In June 1965, Tages' record label Platina released an eponymous EP with the group, which showcased the members' songwriting talent and a venture into a harder rock sound. At the same time, they embarked on their summer tour, which according to Göran Lagerberg came as a shock; "we had just learnt the basics of the show business and suddenly we were the most booked band of the summer". Towards the end of July 1965, Tages had performed at roughly 140 venues in the span of just one and a half months, allowing for them to take a trip to London for a week, during which the band managed to gain new musical influences and clothes; it is also likely that rhythm guitarist Danne Larsson composed "The One for You" based on this trip.

== Composition and recording ==
According to author Lennart Wrigholm, "The One for You" showcased the English influences Tages had received, primarily through the "biting guitar solo". According to Wrigholm and Göran Brandels, "The One for You" drew parallels with groups such as the Who and the Kinks though the primary concept in the end was "something undeniably original". They also note that Larsson composed the song in the key of E minor, mirroring their earlier single, "I Should Be Glad" which was composed by him and Lagerberg. During the verses, drummer Freddie Skantze drums in a traditional time signature of 4/4, though this changes to 4/6 during the choruses and bridges of the song. The harmonial elements of the song also allude to their previous music, which is "interrupted by a song musically distant from their previous material". Wrigholm and Brandels cite the song as an early example of hard rock and a nod to their rhythm and blues inspirations. The lyrics are traditional in the sense that they regard love, though from the perspective of a pursuing narrator attempting to convince their partner to return. Lyrically, Larsson was allegedly inspired by a woman he had met in London.

The day before they had an accordion player in the studio. Then we came and the needles on every VU meter were maxed out and shaking!

— Danne Larsson (2012)

The song was recorded shortly after the group's return to Stockholm from London on 5 August 1965. It was their first session together with experienced producer Anders Henriksson, whom they had met during their summer tour. Henriksson, who was a seasoned producer, had been working with groups such as the Shanes and the Mascots, producing hits on Tio i Topp and Kvällstoppen for them. He was allegedly allocated as the producer for Tages on orders by EMI Records, who were distributing Platina's records. In a later interview, the producer stated that "they sent me to the studio in order to keep watch on them [Tages]". It was also their first session held at Europafilm Studios in Bromma; the previous recordings had been held at various studios throughout Stockholm or Gothenburg. Nonetheless, the session produced "The One for You" and "I Got My Mojo Working", a cover of the Muddy Waters song.

== Release and commercial performance ==
The day after the song had been recorded, Tages were arranged by Lars-Åke Thuresson to be featured in a film which was supposed to be broadcast on Sveriges Television, tying in with the release of "The One for You", in order to ensure that it would become a hit. During filming in Mariestad however, the band ended up in trouble with the police force for blocking an intersection, which led to the project being abandoned by Thuresson and them. It nonetheless sparked the interest of Tages to continue pursuing ambitions in film, which would result in further short videos by the group. Ten days after being recorded, Platina released "The One for You" on 15 August 1965 with "I Got My Mojo Working" on the B-side. Initially, only 2,000 copies of the single were pressed. Due to demand it would see, the song was eventually re-issued in November of that year with a different picture sleeve.

The single entered Kvällstoppen almost a month after release, on 14 September 1965 at a position of number 15. It would peak at number 6 on 12 October before dropping out of the chart on 30 November at a position of number 14, having spent 11 weeks on the chart. It fared even better on Tio i Topp, debuting at number 2 on 25 September, before dropping out of the chart at number 12 the following week. The relative short stay on Tio i Topp and placing on Kvällstoppen came as a shock for the band; their previous singles had all peaked in the top-three on both charts, for a period of at least five weeks or more. However, Kjell Wiremark believes that the relatively poor commercial performance of the song was due it having a different sound compared to their earlier singles, something the fanbase were not accustomed to nor expecting. However, Wrigholm claims that the single charting on Tio i Topp was still "honoring".

As it was custom to feature a recent hit single on an album, both sides of the singles were included on Tages' eponymous debut album, released on 3 November 1965. On the album, "I Got My Mojo Working" is sequenced in the middle of side 1, between "Dimples" and "Naggin'", while "The One for You" is sequenced as the opening track of side 2. After the band left Platina for Parlophone, the former included "The One for You" on the EP Tages-Hits Vol. 1 along with the album The Best of Tages in August 1967. The first release of the song on CD came with the re-issue of Tages compilation album Tages 1964-1968! on 18 November 1992. Both sides of the single were additionally also released on the career-spanning box set This One's for You! on 28 November 1994 together with the rest of their recorded output.

== Reception and legacy ==
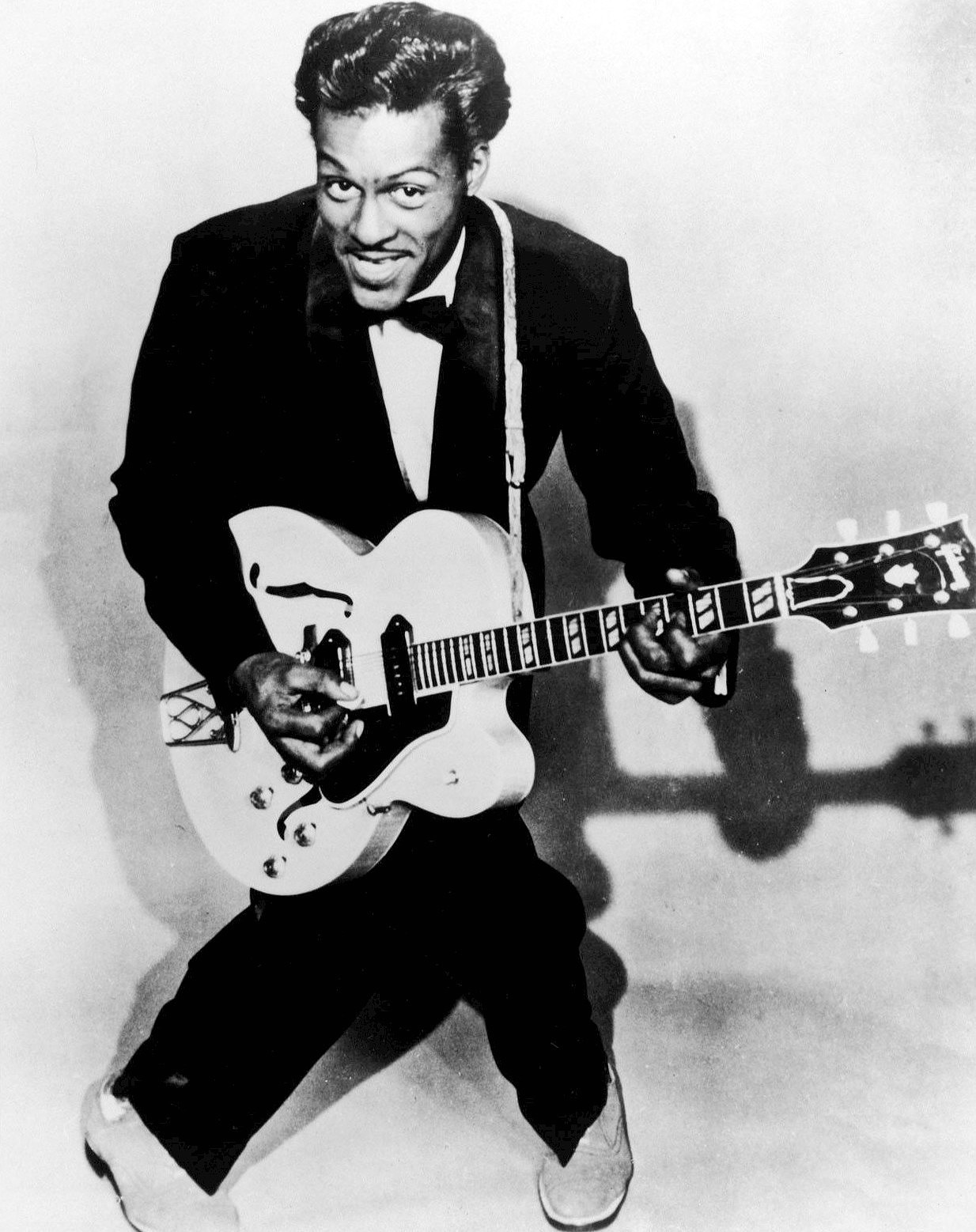
Chuck Berry (pictured here in 1957), gave the single a positive review.

Upon release in Sweden, the single was met with primarily positive reviews from critics. In Göteborgs-Posten, the staff writers suggests that "The One for You" might be an "easily comprehensible" composition owing to the lyrics, though they note the sudden change in genres for the group. They end by noting that the single most likely will become a hit for Tages. In Expressen, the staff describe the song as "singalong" with a catchy guitar solo by Anders Töpel. They write that the song was a sudden and drastic difference for the group, while simultaneously claiming that it "has the harmonies" found in "I Should Be Glad" and "Don't Turn Your Back". They nonetheless state that the single has the potential of reaching number one on Tio i Topp. A reviewer for Aftonbladet states that Tages manage to "pour hits after hits" from their brains, declaring the song may be "musically international", praising the production by Anders Henriksson. The reviewer claims that it might be the group's best performance yet.

However, the greatest acclaim for the single, which Tages also took to heart, came from Chuck Berry. Reviewing singles for teen magazine Bildjournalen, Berry writes "The One for You" was the best record he had heard in Sweden, stating that Tages "were Sweden's greatest band", and should have a "cemented" placement under the Beatles and the Rolling Stones. According to Wrigholm and Brandels, Tages and Chuck Berry had already established a relationship, as bassist Göran Lagerberg and drummer Freddie Skantze both had backed him during a Swedish tour on 27 October 1965. Wiremark states that this was "one of the first times" an internationally famous musician and musicians from Sweden had recorded together.

Retrospectively, "The One for You" has been considered one of the best singles in Sweden of the 1960s. Wrigholm states that Tages were in a different league compared to the other Swedish pop-groups at the time, primarily due to the recording of "The One For You", while Brandels believes that it is a "pop-classic from start to end". They note that the musical crescendo performed on guitar in the opening was unique to the song and put it in a "dimension" away from other bands during the time. According to Harry Amster, "The One for You" could've been put on the legendary compilation Nuggets: Original Artyfacts from the First Psychedelic Era, 1965–1968, owing to the raunchy guitar sound. According to music critic Richie Unterberger, "The One for You" was an "accomplished mod rocke[r] on par with some of the best material of the sort being produced in Britain", while he also stated that it was vicious.

== Personnel ==
Personnel according to the box set This One's for You!

- Tommy Blom – percussion
- Anders Töpel – lead guitar
- Danne Larsson – rhythm guitar, harmony lead vocals
- Göran Lagerberg – bass guitar, harmony lead vocals
- Freddie Skantze – drums

== Charts ==
Weekly chart performance for "The One for You"
Chart (1965)	Peak position
Sweden (Kvällstoppen)	6
Sweden (Tio i Topp)	2

== Sources ==
- Brandels, Göran; Wrigholm, Lennart (2012). Boken om Tages: från Avenyn till Abbey Road. Premium Publishing. ISBN 978-91-89136-88-5.
- Wrigholm, Lennart (1991). "Tages: Makalös grej i Götet…". Now & then.
- Wiremark, Kjell (1994). Tages – This One's For You! (CD) (in Swedish). EMI. 4751382.
- Hallberg, Eric; Henningsson, Ulf (2012). Tio i Topp - med de utslagna "på försök" 1961–74 (in Swedish). Premium. ISBN 978-91-89136-89-2.
- Hallberg, Eric (1993). Eric Hallberg presenterar Kvällstoppen i P3. Drift. ISBN 9-789-16-302-14-04.
