= Och du tände stjärnorna =

Studio album by Thorleifs
- Released: November 1994
- Recorded: KMH Studios, Stockholm, Sweden
- Genre: dansband music
- Label: BMG Ariola
- Producer: Lasse Westmann, Thorleif Torstensson

Thorleifs chronology
Med dej vill jag leva (1992)	Och du tände stjärnorna (1994)	Historien Thorleifs (1995)

Och du tände stjärnorna is a 1994 Thorleifs album. The album peaked at number 45 on Swedish Albums Chart.

== Track listing ==
1. "Du gav mig kärlek"
2. "Innan natten blir till dag"
3. "Och du tände stjärnorna"
4. "Det sa bom bom i mitt hjärta"
5. "Jag var så kär"
6. "Får du tårar på din kind"
7. "Vinternatt"
8. "The Young Ones"
9. "Fem röda rosor till dej"
10. "Måne"
11. "En gyllene ring"
12. "Du sa farväl"
13. "Vi tror på lyckan"
14. "Swing it, magistern!" (medley)
15. "Puff, the Magic Dragon"
16. "Så länge hjärtat slår"
17. "När natten blir till dag"

== Charts ==
Chart (1994)	Peak position
Sweden (Sverigetopplistan)	45
