= Sweet Kissin' in the Moonlight: Den första kyssen =

Studio album by Thorleifs
- Released: 29 April 2009
- Recorded: Meat Studio, Västerås, Sweden/Skeda Studio, Norrhult, Sweden
- Genre: dansband music
- Length: 41 minutes
- Label: Warner Music Sweden
- Producers: Thorleif Torstensson, Thomas Thörnholm

Thorleifs chronology
Förälskade (2008)	Sweet Kissin' in the Moonlight: Den första kyssen (2009)	Thorleifs största hits (2010)

Sweet Kissin' in the Moonlight: Den första kyssen is a studio album by Thorleifs, released 29 April 2009. Even a Danish language-version of the album, Sweet Kissin' in the Moonlight: Det første kys, was recorded.

== Track listing ==
1. "Ett litet ristat hjärta"
2. "Upp till dans"
3. "Där du är"
4. "Glöm ej bort att älska varann"
5. "Sweet Kissin' in the Moonlight"
6. "Orden hon sa" ("Open Your Heart")
7. "Kan du pröva att förstå"
8. "Kom stanna hos mig"
9. "Rör vid min själ" ("You Raise Me Up")
10. "Party Town" ("Party Time")
11. "En ängel längs min väg"
12. "Tusen vita syrener"
13. "Varm korv boogie"

== Contributors ==
- Thorleifs – musicians

== Charts ==
=== Weekly charts ===
Chart (2009)	Peak position
Danish Albums (Hitlisten)	25
Norwegian Albums (VG-lista)	26
Swedish Albums (Sverigetopplistan)	2

=== Year-end charts ===
Chart (2009)	Position
Swedish Albums (Sverigetopplistan)	81

== Certifications ==
Region	Certification	Certified units/sales
Sweden (GLF)	Gold	20,000^{^}
^{^} Shipments figures based on certification alone.
