= Johnny Blue (album) =

Studio album by Thorleifs
- Released: June 1981
- Genre: dansband music
- Label: Tor
- Producer: Thorleif Torstensson

Thorleifs chronology
När dina ögon ler (1980)	Johnny Blue (1981)	Saxgodingar instrumentalt (1981)

Johnny Blue is a 1981 Thorleifs studio album. It peaked at the 50th position on the Swedish albums chart.

== Track listing ==
1. "Du hänger väl med opp" ("Making Your Mind Up")
2. "Håll mig närmare"
3. "Livets skatt"
4. "Trettifyran" ("This Ole House")
5. "Tiden som går (lär läka sår)" ("How Can You Mend a Broken Heart")
6. "Drömflicka" ("Dream Lover")
7. "Johnny Blue" ("Johnny Blue")
8. "Hallå där"
9. "La Paloma"
10. "En dröm" ("In Dreams")
11. "En ängel"
12. "No Particular Place to Go"

== Charts ==
Chart (1981)	Peak position
Sweden (Sverigetopplistan)	42
