= Bloodhound (song) =

1961 single by Larry Bright; covered by Tages in 1965

Single by Tages

from the album Tages
- B-side: "Whatcha Gonna Do About It"
- Released: November 19, 1965
- Recorded: October 5–6, 1965
- Studio: Europafilm, Stockholm
- Genre: Garage rock
- Length: 2:34
- Label: Platina
- Songwriter: Julian Bright
- Producer: Anders Henriksson

Tages singles chronology
"The One for You" (1965)	"Bloodhound" (1965)	"So Many Girls" (1966)

Audio
- "Bloodhound" on YouTube

"Bloodhound" is a song, initially written and performed by soul singer Larry Bright (credited under his birth name Julian Bright) in 1961. Initially performed as a rhythm and blues song, it quickly garnered a reputation as a garage rock song following a cover by British rock band Downliners Sect. The most well-known and commercially successful rendition of the song was recorded by Swedish rock band Tages in 1965, who charted on both Tio i Topp and Kvällstoppen with their garage rock version of it.

== Larry Bright original ==
Larry Bright was the stage name of Julian Bright, an aspiring singer and guitarist from Norfolk, Virginia. Signing with Tide Records in 1960, he released his first and only charting single, "Mojo Workout" in June of that year. It managed to reach number 90 on the Billboard Hot 100 and number 96 on the Cash Box Top 100. Shortly after the release, Bright signed another recording contract with the Rendevouz Records label, prompting Tide to sue them for breach of contract; it was eventually settled, which meant that Tide could prolong their contract with Bright.

"Bloodhound" was initially written by Bright in his traditional rhythm and blues style, and features a spoken word intro accompanied by guitar licks by Bright. The entire song is largely driven by licks played by Bright, who is accompanied by a rhythm guitar and piano throughout the song. Imitations of a howling dog can be heard throughout the song, primarily during the instrumental break. The song was initially released as the B-side of Bright's single "Way Down Home" in 1961, a release which failed to chart. It was later compiled and featured on his only compilation album, Shake That Thing, released by Del-Fi Records in 1997.

== Tages version ==
The most commercially successful version of the song was recorded by Swedish rock band Tages in 1965. Though the band's rhythm guitarist Danne Larsson claimed that Tages primarily came across songs through their original versions, the group's version is more structurally similar to Downliners Sect's version from the year prior. Freddie Skantze's drumming dominates a large portion of the band's rendition, being mixed high during the recording. Though their rendition features an "energetic guitar solo" by Anders Töpel, Larsson's rhythm guitar playing should not be "understated" as it was largely "a driving force in the song." Kjell Wiremark believes the song to have "almost a slight touch" of garage rock to it. Together with almost their entire debut album, Tages recorded the song on October 5–6 1965 at Europafilm in Mariehäll, Stockholm, with Anders Henriksson producing.

"Bloodhound" was initially released on November 3, 1965 as part of Tages eponymous debut album, where it was sequenced as the opening track. However, as Tages had not had a single in the charts for almost two months by then, along with an ambition to capitalize on the Christmas sales rush, Platina Records issued "Bloodhound" as a single in 3,000 copies on November 19, 1965, only a few weeks after it had been released on the album. The B-side was a cover of the Small Faces song "Whatcha Gonna Do About It", which had been recorded but left as an outtake during the same sessions as "Bloodhound". Retrospectively, it was revealed that the single had been unauthorized by the band; Larsson jokingly stated during an interview in the year 2000 that the song had only been released as a single in order for "the record label manager [Evert Jakobsson] to afford a new car".

"Bloodhound" nonetheless managed to become a chart hit in Sweden, debuting and peaking at number 6 on Tio i Topp on December 4, 1965. It exited the chart on January 15, 1966 at a position of 13, having spent 5 weeks on Tio i Topp. It did however, sell well enough to gain a chart position on Kvällstoppen, where it debuted at a position of 11 on December 7, 1965. It peaked at number 3 on January 11, 1966 before exiting the chart entirely on February 15, 1966, at a position of number 20. It had spent 11 weeks on that chart too. In neighboring Finland, it was the second of three singles by the band to chart, reaching number 40 on the Soumen Virallinen chart in December 1965.

Despite the chart success, which Lennart Wrigholm attributes to a "fairly energetic" vocal performance by singer Tommy Blom, "Bloodhound" largely alienated some fans and critics, who both felt that the song was a "step back", compared to Tages previous single "The One for You" (1965). Additionally, "Bloodhound" was the first cover that the band released on an A-side, as all their previous singles had been group compositions. "Bloodhound" was also Tages first single since their debut "Sleep Little Girl" (1964) to feature Blom on lead vocals; he had largely been overshadowed by bassist Göran Lagerberg in that role for the band's three previous singles.

== Charts ==
Weekly chart performance for "Bloodhound"
Chart (1965–1966)	Peak position
Finland (Suomen Virallinen)	40
Sweden (Kvällstoppen)	3
Sweden (Tio i Topp)	6

== Sources ==
- Brandels, Göran; Wrigholm, Lennart (2012). Boken om Tages: från Avenyn till Abbey Road. Premium Publishing. ISBN 978-91-89136-88-5.
- Wrigholm, Lennart (1991). "Tages: Makalös grej i Götet…". Now & then.
- Wiremark, Kjell (1994). Tages – This One's For You! (CD) (in Swedish). EMI. 4751382.
- Hallberg, Eric; Henningsson, Ulf (2012). Tio i Topp - med de utslagna "på försök" 1961–74 (in Swedish). Premium. ISBN 978-91-89136-89-2.
- Hallberg, Eric (1993). Eric Hallberg presenterar Kvällstoppen i P3. Drift. ISBN 9-789-16-302-14-04.
