= Small Town Singers =

- Origin: Söderköping, Sweden
- Genre: visa
- Years active: 1967-

Small Town Singers is a musical group in Söderköping, Sweden. Established in 1967, the group scored several Svensktoppen successes during the mid-late 1970s and early 1980s. Sometimes, they still appear for sporadic performances.

== Svensktoppen charting songs ==
- "Hemlängtan" (one week, 1974)
- "Dansen på Sunnanö" (elva veckor, 1974)
- "Som stjärnor små" (one week, 1975)
- "En sjömansvisa" (three weeks, 1975)
- "Fritiofs avsked" (eleven weeks, 1975)
- "Utövisan" (seven weeks, 1977)
- "Sommarbrevet" (ten weeks, 1979)
- "Jag gör så att blommorna blommar" (tio veckor, 1979)
- "Jag har vandrat mina stigar" (three weeks, 1981)
