= I ett fotoalbum (album) =

Studio album by Lasse Stefanz
- Released: 1998
- Genre: country, dansband
- Label: Frituna

Lasse Stefanz chronology
Sommardansen 2 (1997)	I ett fotoalbum (1998)	Över en kopp i vår berså (1999)

I ett fotoalbum is a 1998 album by Swedish dansband Lasse Stefanz. The title track was a 1998 Svensktoppen hit.

== Track listing ==
1. I ett fotoalbum
2. Är det kärlek du behöver
3. Jag vill ge dig min morgon
4. Septemberregn
5. Gamle gosse
6. Toma löften, toma ord
7. Samma sol lyser än
8. Du är vinden i mitt segel
9. Bara en lek
10. Den gamla grinden
11. Båten till Köpenhamn
12. Ännu blommar kärleken
13. Kärlekens sång
14. Dansa natten lång

== Charts ==
Chart (1998)	Peak position
Norway (VG-lista)	39
Sweden (Sverigetopplistan)	10
