= Pláhnetan =

Icelandic rock band

- Origin: Reykjavík
- Genres: Rock and roll Pop
- Years active: 1993–1995
- Label: Skífan
- Members: Stefán Hilmarsson; Ingólfur Sigurðsson; Jakob Smári Magnússon; Sigurður Gröndal; Ingólfur Guðjónsson
- Past members: Friðrik Sturluson

Pláhnetan was an Icelandic rock band formed in the spring of 1993 after singer Stefán Hilmarsson, Ingólfur Guðjónsson and Sigurður Gröndal wrote several songs for Stefán's forthcoming solo album, but the group got along so well that they decided to continue composing and even form a new band with that material under Stefán's management.

The name Pláhnetan is a game-word, since the word pláneta means planet, but with the addition of the h, the ending part formed is hneta, which mean nut. Therefore, its name could be translated as the planut.

In those days Stefán and bassist Friðrik Sturluson were in the band Sálin hans Jóns míns while Ingólfur Guðjónsson and Sigurður Gröndal had quit their band Loðin Rotta, so they called drummer Ingólfur Sigurðsson, who up to that moment had been playing in bands like Síðan Skein Sól (a.k.a. S.S.Sól) and Rauðir Fletir.

The band contacted Steinar Berg Ísleifsson, the owner of label Skífan and got a record deal, which allowed them to release their debut album in June the same year under the title of Speis (Icelandic phonetic spelling for the English word Space), a work which dealt with the concept of space and got good reviews by the critics. Some of the songs became very popular and the band took the chance to tour the country to promote the album.

After this album, singer Stefán released a solo album called Líf (Life) with the help of the band.

By 1994 Friðrik had left the band and was replaced by bassist Jakob Smári Magnússon, who was known for playing in Tappi Tíkarrass, MX-21 and S.S.Sól. The new line-up released an album in June called Plast (Plastic) which featured singer Björgvin Halldórsson in the song “Ég Vissi Það”.

By the fall Pláhnetan released one single called "Sæla" with the collaboration of singer Emilíana Torrini.

In 1995, they called it a day when Stefán's band Sálin Hans Jóns Míns started to play again.

== Discography ==
Albums:

- 1993 - Speis (Skífan)
- 1994 - Plast (Skífan)

Single:

- 1995 - Sæla (Skífan)

Featuring:

- 1993 - Bandalög 6 / Algjört Skronster, Icelandic compilation.
- 1993 - Grimm Dúndur, Icelandic compilation.
- 1994 - Heyrðu 5, Icelandic compilation.
- 1995 - Í Sól og Sumaryl, Icelandic compilation.
- 2003 - Óskalögin 7, Icelandic compilation.
- 2004 - Óskalögin 8, Icelandic compilation.
