= Leva (album) =

Studio album by Elisa Lindström
- Released: 2 April 2014
- Genre: Dansband
- Label: Lionheart

Elisa Lindström chronology
Leva (2014)	Roses in the Rain (2017)

Singles from Leva
- 1. "Casanova" Released: 2 February 2014

Leva is the debut studio album by Swedish singer Elisa Lindström.

== Track listing ==
1. "Leva"
2. "Casanova"
3. "Ingen tar min man"
4. "Tack för lånet"
5. "Du gör mig galen"
6. "Lillasyster"
7. "Broarna brinner"
8. "Illusion"
9. "Flickan i spegeln"
10. "Det känns så nu"
11. "Ingenting annat än dig"
12. "Om du fick va för alltid"

== Charts ==
Chart (2014)	Peak position
Swedish Albums (Sverigetopplistan)	13
