= Tre amigos =

Studio album by Just D
- Released: 1993
- Genre: Hip-hop, rock
- Language: Swedish
- Label: Telegram Records Stockholm

Just D chronology
Rock N Roll (1992)	Tre amigos (1993)	Plast (1995)

Tre amigos is the fourth official album by Swedish hip-hop group Just D. It was album released in 1993.

The album was produced by Just D and recorded during jam sessions with Wille on guitar, Pedda on bass and Gurra on drums. Samples are still there (for example "Sug på den" is based on ABBA's "Man in the Middle"), but they played a very minor role. In hindsight, there are parallels to Beastie Boys' Paul's Boutique from 1989. The group's appearance was, as grunge fashion prescribed, dressed down. They called it themselves "the hobo look" and the album cover were also designed to give an air of cheapness and kitsch. The album's cover was adorned by three older, slightly antiquated gentlemen dressed in clothing typical to the group members.

Joakim Thåström makes a guest appearance as chorus singer on "Sug på den" ("Suck it"), a song full of insults.

== Track listing ==
No.	Title	Length
1.	"Rädda världen (Uztra Stredera)"	3:19
2.	"Vart tog den söta lilla flickan vägen?"	3:30
3.	"Sug på den"	3:46
4.	"På muggen"	1:15
5.	"Droppar"	2:48
6.	"Cuervo Especial"	0:47
7.	"Saker som får en att 'ahhh'"	2:17
8.	"Hög"	3:14
9.	"Full & dum"	2:20
10.	"Svarta får"	4:25
11.	"Tre amigos"	2:30
12.	"Banjo"	0:31
13.	"Krig"	2:22
14.	"Roliga tider"	4:14
15.	"Innan dom stänger"	3:24

== Charts ==
Chart (1993–1994)	Peak position
Swedish Albums (Sverigetopplistan)	3

== Certifications ==
Region	Certification	Certified units/sales
Sweden (GLF)	Gold	50,000^{^}
^{^} Shipments figures based on certification alone.
