= Swing it, magistern! (song) =

Song by Alice Babs
- Language: Swedish
- Released: 1940
- Genre: swing
- Songwriters: Kai Gullmar; Hasse Ekman

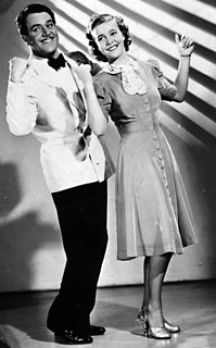
Adolf Jahr and Alice Babs in Swing it, Magistern! (1940)

"Swing it, magistern!" is a song recorded by Alice Babs, released on record in 1940 and also appearing in the Swedish 1940 film Swing it, magistern!

Lars Vegas trio recorded the song on the 1992 album På korståg för schlagerns bevarande., which also Simons did the same year on the album Melodier vi minns and in 1994 the song was recorded by Thorleifs on the album Och du tände stjärnorna.

The song is composed by Kai Gullmar with lyrics by Hasse Ekman.
