= Varm korv boogie =

Single by Owe Thörnqvist
- A-side: "Varm korv boogie"
- B-side: "Svartbäckens ros"
- Released: 1959
- Recorded: Metronome Studio, Stockholm, 20 Februari 1959
- Genre: rock
- Label: Metronome
- Songwriter: Owe Thörnqvist

Varm korv boogie is a song written and composed by Owe Thörnqvist. Describing a hot dog (varm korv in Swedish) salesman at Fyristorg in Uppsala, who turns to rock music after his business is closed down by the local health department for him carrying the hotdogs in a box placed on the stomach. It is considered one of the earliest Swedish rock songs. Becoming one of his most famous songs, it has appeared in many songbooks at school in Sweden, and is common at sing-along events.

Owe Thörnqvist recorded the song and released it as a single in 1959, with Svartbäckens ros acting as a A-side. The same year, the song also appeared as second track on the EP "Svartbäckens ros".

In 1959 he also recorded it in Norwegian as Varm pølse boogie, with Gun fra Haugesund (Gun från Dragarbrunn) releasing it as a single the same year.

The song also appeared on the 1986 Owe Thörnqvist live album Owe Thörnqvist live.

== Later recordings ==
Artist	Year
Trio me' Bumba	1973 single Varm korv boogie
Family Four	1973 single Varm korv boogie and 1974 album Kalla't va' du vill
Four Seven	1974 single Tiotusen röda rosor
Berth Idoffs	1975 album Sjung, le och dansa
Lill-Bengths	1979 album Varm korv boogie
Ann Persson	1981 album Sverigebesöket
Wästlaget	1982 album Countrykul
Liljedahls	1984 album Liljedahls på Björkgården
Rock-Olga	1989 compilation album Rock-Olga 1958-1988
Blue Steam, Gert-Johanz, Anders Ericsson	2005 album En samling med Blue Steam, Gert-Johanz, Anders Ericsson
Thorleifs	2009 album Sweet Kissin' in the Moonlight: Den första kyssen
