= I ett fotoalbum =

Song by Thorleifs
- Language: Swedish
- Released: 1977
- Genre: dansband music
- Label: Tor
- Songwriters: Lars E. Carlsson, Hans Sidén

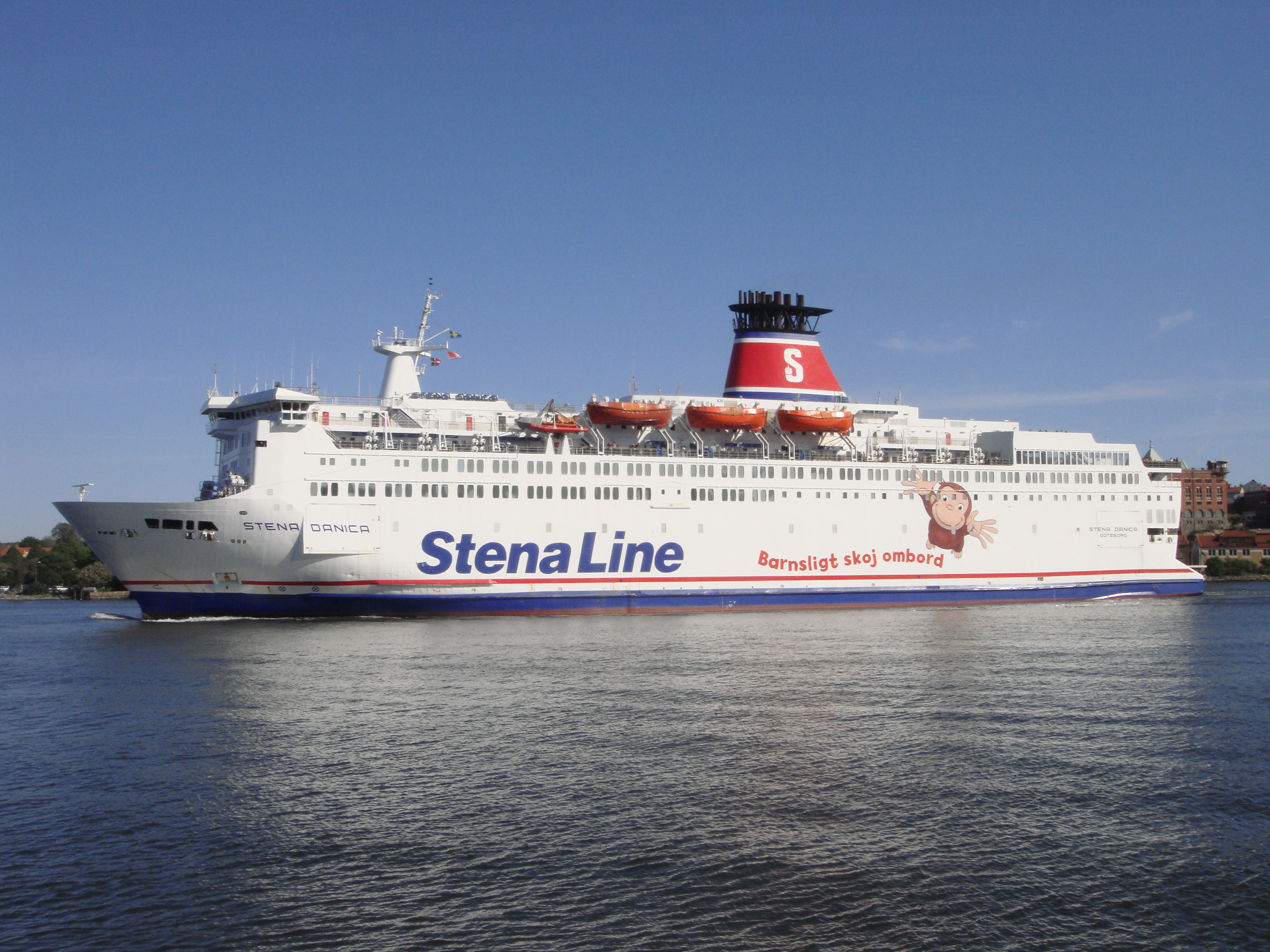
Describing how watching a photographic album brings back various memories from life, the song opens with memories from missing the ferryboat ending up last in the line of cars during the holiday.

I ett fotoalbum is a song written by Lars E. Carlsson and Hans Sidén. In 1977, three different versions were released by Bendix (titled: "Tänk så man såg ut"), by Dancemän on the album Djurgårdsfärjan as "I ett fotoalbum (där står tiden stilla)", and by Thorleifs the same year on the album Du, bara du as "I ett fotoalbum".

Börje Franzen recorded the song in 1981 on the album De' e någe visst me' de', under the title Tänk som man såg ut, the refrain closing words of the songs, and in 1983 the song was recorded by Tommy Bergs on the album Sköna mogenlåtar.

Song lyrics describe sitting and watching an old photographic album, remembering incidents in life, like cards from holiday trips missing the ferryboat and ending up last in the line of cars, as well as summertime memories, and children and deceased ones, and finally smiling when thinking of how you looked.

In 1998 Lasse Stefanz scored a cover hit with the song, staying at Svensktoppen for 13 weeks between 25 July-17 October 1998 The song also became title track for the band's studio album the same year. Lasse Stefanz also released the song as a 1998 single, with "Nu och för alltid" acting as B-side.
