= Thomas Deutgen =

Swedish television and radio presenter (born 1963)

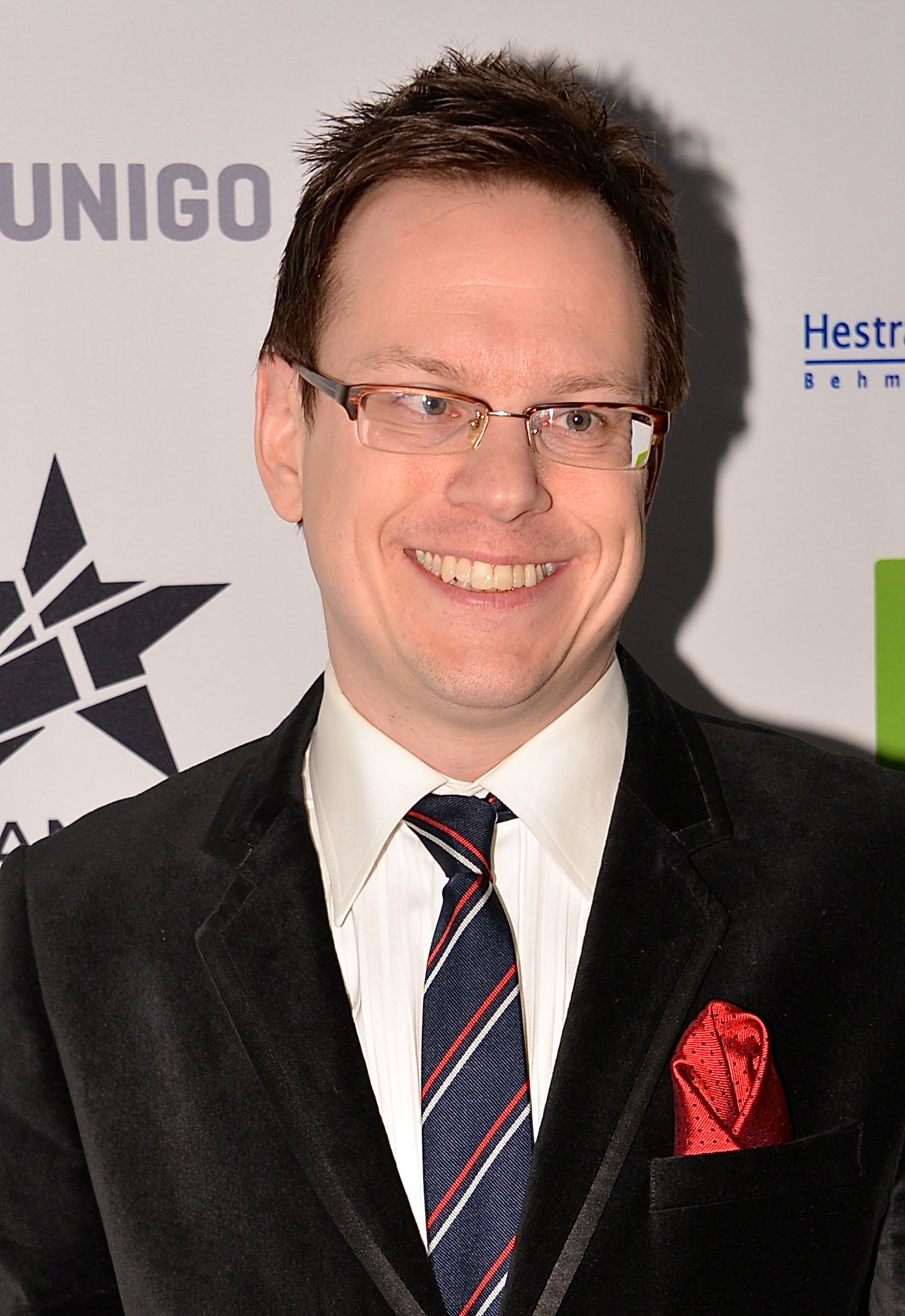
- Thomas Deutgen during the Swedish Grammis Awards at Cirkus in Stockholm in February 2013.
- Born: 29 March 1973 (age 53); Boden, Sweden
- Occupation: Television presenter

Thomas Deutgen (born 29 March 1973) is a Swedish television and radio presenter, best known as presenter of the Sveriges Radio show I afton dans (1999-2003). He has been a reporter and presenter for the local radio SR Norrbotten, and editor at the magazine Får jag lov. He has also presented the danceband music show P4 Dans on Sveriges Radio P4.

In 2008, he became known as a judge in the SVT show Dansbandskampen, he also was a jury member in the second series of the show. In January 2016 Deutgen presented the danceband show Tack för dansen which was broadcast on TV4, along with singer Elisa Lindström, He presented as well the second season in August 2016.

He lives in Karlshamn. In August 2011, Deutgen married singer and music producer Anna Neah Olsson.
