= Gråt inga tårar =

Single by Thorleifs

from the album Gråt inga tårar
- A-side: "Gråt inga tårar"
- B-side: "Jag är så gla'
- Released: 1974
- Genre: dansband music
- Label: Platina
- Songwriter: Åke Hallgren

Thorleifs singles chronology
""En dag i juni" ("Safe in My Garden")/"En äkta rock'n roll"'" (1973)	"Gråt inga tårar" (1974)	""Skänk mig dina tankar"/"Lorna"'" (1975)

"Gråt inga tårar" is a song written by Åke Hallgren in the dansband Pippis from Hede, and recorded and a released a single by several dansbands in 1974, including Pippis, Dannys and Thorleifs. Pippis also recorded the song on the 1975 album Ordning på torpet.

Thorleifs, who used "Jag är så gla'" as a B-side, released the song as a 1974 single, only available for members in the Thorleifs fan club scoring a Svensktoppen hit for 11 weeks during the period of 11 March-4 May 1975 peaking at third position. The single sold platina and also gave the name to the band 's 1975 album Gråt inga tårar. The song was also recorded in Danish, as "Græd ingen tårer".

In 2000, Swedish radio program I afton dans in Sveriges Radio P4 held a voting where the song was appointed "Dansband song of the 20th century". The song has also been appointed "dansband hit song of all times".

In 2006, Thorleifs participated at Sveriges Television's "Musikministeriet" recording "Gråt inga tårar" together with Balkan band Süperstar Orkestar from the Republic of Macedonia. During a test to combine Balkan music with dansband music, the song was re-arranged from major scale to minor scale, creating the original concept of "Dansband-Balkan music". Süperstar Orkestar also recorded the song for the 2008 album Balkanized.

== Other versions ==
- Swedish heavy metal band Black Ingvars recorded the song on the 1995 album Earcandy Six.
- At Körslaget 2009 the song was performed by Stefan Nykvist's choir from Älvdalen
- At Dansbandskampen 2009 the song was performed by Titanix, using a bugg tempo, while the song at Dansbandskampen 2010 was performed by Elisas, who also recorded the song for the 2011 album Det här är bara början.
- Anne-Lie Rydé recorded the song in 2010 on the album Dans på rosor.
- Maria Anderberg recorded the song in English, as "Tears in My Eyes".
