= Till Folkets park =

Studio album by Thorleifs
- Released: April 1987
- Genre: dansband music
- Label: Mariann
- Producer: Mikael Wendt

Thorleifs chronology
Saxgodingar 2 (1983)	Till Folkets park (1987)	Saxgodingar 2 (1987)

Till Folkets park is Thorleifs 1987 studio album. It peaked at number 38 on the Swedish Albums Chart. The album was also released as CD and cassette tape.

== Track listing ==
=== Side A ===
1. "Till Folkets park"
2. "På röda rosor faller tårar" ("Auf rote Rosen fallen Tränen")
3. "Allt jag vill ha"
4. "Sista visan"
5. "Ner mot havet" ("You Want Love")
6. "Ung och evig"
7. "Stjärna stjärna"

=== Side B ===
1. "Lördans" ("Lördanspiing")
2. "Aldrig nå'nsin (glömmer jag dig)"
3. "Det skall komma en morgon"
4. "Lucky Luke"
5. "Så länge mina ögon ser"
6. "Vänner"
7. Swing'n Rock medley
  1. "In the Mood"
  2. "Bye Bye Blackbird"
  3. "American Patrol"
  4. "A String of Pearls"
  5. "Take the "A" Train"
  6. "Rock Around the Clock"
  7. "Blue Suede Shoes"
  8. "See You Later Alligator"
  9. "Chattanooga Choo Choo"
  10. "In the Mood"

== Charts ==
Chart (1987)	Peak position
Sweden (Sverigetopplistan)	42
