= Det ska va lätt =

Studio album by Elisa's
- Released: 24 September 2014
- Genre: Dansband music
- Label: Lionheart

Elisa's chronology
| Be mig! Se mig! Ge mig! (2013) | Det ska va lätt (2014) |

Det ska va lätt is a 2014 studio album by Elisa's.

== Track listing ==
1. Det ska va lätt
2. Tänk om vi aldrig
3. Kyss mig nu
4. Låt första tåren falla
5. Det är detta jag vill
6. California Blue
7. Lite kär
8. Vaken själv
9. Tre små ord
10. Crazy
11. Kärleken får ta en dag i sänder
12. Bilden av dig

== Charts ==
| Chart (2014) | Peak position |
|---|---|
| Swedish Albums (Sverigetopplistan) | 2 |
