= Och du tände stjärnorna (song) =

Single by Thorleifs

from the album Och du tände stjärnorna
- A-side: "Och du tände stjärnorna"
- Released: 1994
- Genre: dansband music
- Label: BMG Ariola
- Songwriter: Bert Månson

Thorleifs singles chronology
"Jag vill ge dig en sång" (1994)	"Och du tände stjärnorna" (1994)	"Gråt inga tårar" (1995)

Och du tände stjärnorna is a song written by Bert Månson, and recorded by Thorleifs, who won the 1994 Hänt song contest with the song. The song was also released as a single in 1994, and became a major hit. The song charted at Svensktoppen i for totally 18 weeks between 23 July-19 November 1994, topping the chart.

The song was also recorded in Den spelades också Danish, as "Du tænde stjernerne".

In March 2000, the song won a voting contest for the best Thorleif songs of the 1990s.

The song also appears in the TV series "Leende guldbruna ögon" from 2007.

Anne-Lie Rydé covered the song in 2010 on her album Dans på rosor.
