= Elisa's =

Swedish dansband

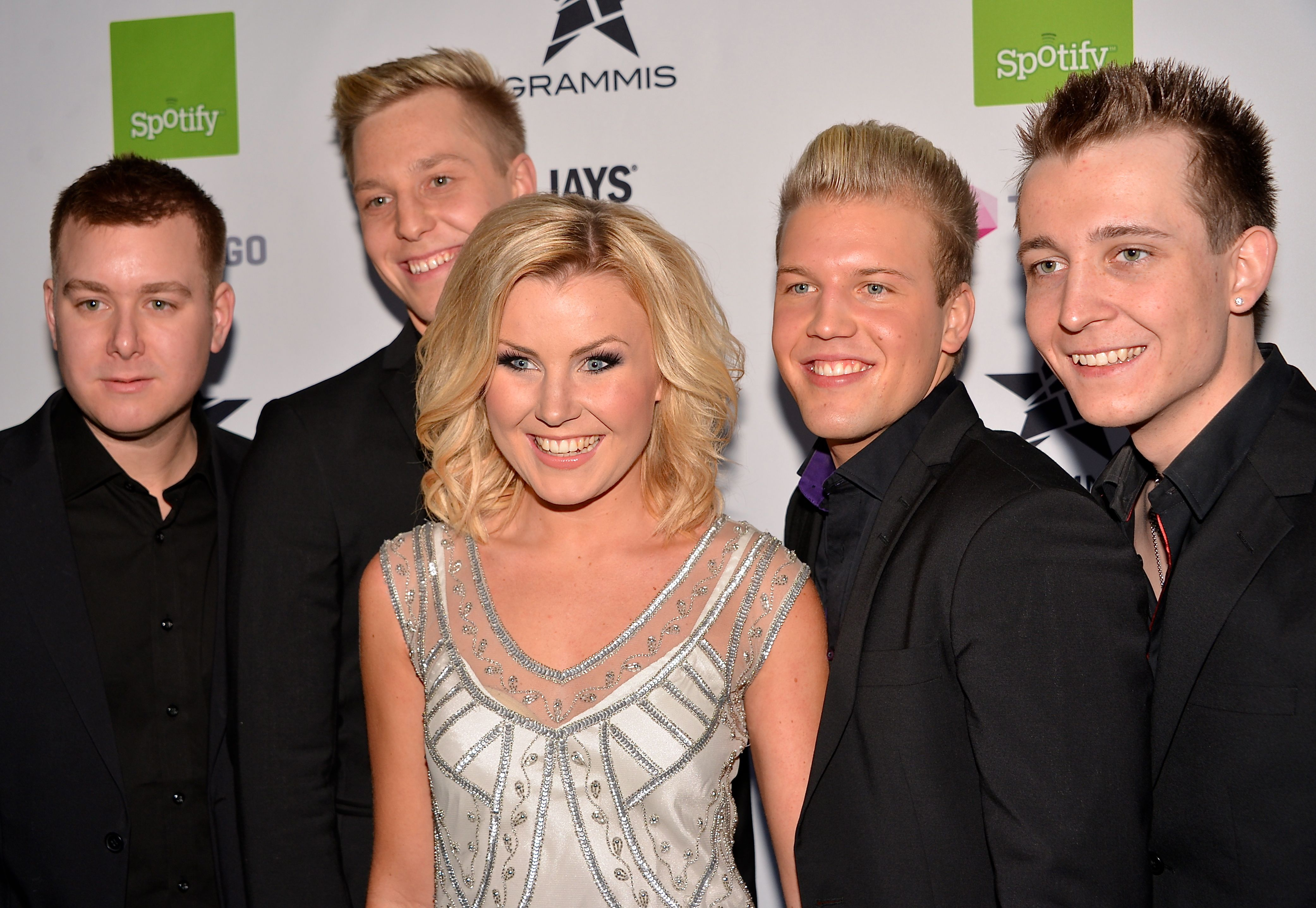
- Elisa's at Grammisgalan in 2013

Background information
- Origin: Västra Götaland County, Sweden
- Genre: Dansband
- Years active: 2009–present

Elisa's is a Swedish dansband from the Skaraborg, established in 2009. The band is named after its lead singer Elisa Lindström. The band won the 2010 Dansbandskampen competition.

The band was launched by young artists in Musikgymnasiet i Skövde (the Music College in Skövde). During late 2010, the band's fame spread in Sweden. Their first single, "Hey Go So Long", was recorded in February 2010. In 2011, the band went to the top of the Swedish Albums Chart with their debut studio album Det här är bara början

== Members ==
Elisa's is made up of:

- Elisa Lindström – lead vocals, trumpet
- Markus Frykén – guitar
- Petter Ferneman – bass, accordion
- Robert Lundh – piano
- Daniel Wallin – drums

== Discography ==
=== Albums ===
Year	Album	Chart peak SWE	Certification
2011	Det här är bara början	1	
2012	Det sa klick!	4	
2013	Be mig! Se mig! Ge mig!	3	
2013	En gnistrande jul	8	
2014	Det ska va lätt	2	
2015	Utekväll	1	

=== Singles ===
Year	Song	Chart peak SWE	Certification	Album
2010	"Hey Go So Long"	–		Non-album release
2010	"Om du säger att du älskar mig"	59		Det här är bara början

=== Svensktoppen songs ===
- 2011: "Det här är bara början"
- 2011: "En stjärna föll för oss"
- 2011: "Jag säger som det är"
