= Thor-Erics =

- Origin: Hyssna, Sweden
- Genres: dansband music
- Years active: 1963–27 December 1999
- Labels: Platina

Thor-Erics was a dansband in Hyssna, Sweden. The band was established in 1963 and performed for last time on 27 December 1999. The band appeared at TV in Sweden and Norway several times. Nick Borgen performed with the band by the late 1970s and early 1980s.

== Discography ==
=== Albums ===
- Sju ensamma kvällar med Thor-Erics - 1967
- Försök att vara lite vänlig - 1971
- Vårt strå till stacken - 1972
- En tidig sönda' morron - 1973
- Vi ses igen - 1974
- På jakt efter dig - 1976
- Blue Jeans Baby - 1976
- Resa med Solen - 1977
- Kärleken är ingen lek min vän - 1978
- Thor-Erics bästa. 2 - 1979
- Med lite tur - 1980
- Gi meg en dag i morgen - 1980 (Nick Borgen album with Thor Erics contributing)
- Än en gång - 1981
- We Wanna be Free - 1983
- Sommarens sista ros - 1987
- Thor Erics - 1996

=== Singles ===
- Anna-Bella/Alla minnen blott - 1965
- Sju ensamma kvällar/Ann-Maria - 1966
- En liten amulett/Att finna lyckan/Inga-Lena/Hej, hej, hej - 1966
- En liten amulett/Att finna lyckan - 1967
- Fru Karlsson/Ingen förstår - 1967
- Jag har väntat så länge på dig/Tankelek - 1967
- Alltid ensam/Där jag lekte som barn - 1968
- Mycket kär/Rosen och vinden - 1969
- Liza/Memphis Tennessee - 1969
- Oh! Carol/Memphis Tennessee - 1969
- Du är min nu/Nej, nej, nej, nej - 1969
- Vit som en orkidé/Du borde tänka... - 1970
- Jag vill ge dig allt/Livet är värt en sång - 1970
- Jag ser med andra ögon nu/Två så helt i de' blå - 1971
- Familjelycka/Som en sång som vi sjöng en gång - 1971
- Bara sol, inte ett enda moln/Hjälp mig ur min ensamhet - 1972
- Tänker var minut på dig/En plats med luft och ljus - 1973
- Vårt eget land/Kärlek har jag fått - 1973
- Den dagen du gick/En solig sönda' morron - 1973
- Telstar/Rock'n roll musik - 1974
- Vaccinet/TV-kväll - 1974
- Lev ditt liv så att du ingenting ångrar/Aja baja Anna-Maja - 1974
- Ommi-Damm-Damm/Ta och fråga ditt hjärta - 1976 (with Jimmy Andersson)
- Resa med Solen/Yes I Will I'll Be True to You - 1977
- Skateboard Queen/My Angel Annie - 1978
- Jul i vårt hus/Jul i vårt hus (instrumental) - 1989
- Anders & Britta/Du - 1989
- Drömsemestern/Om det faller en stjärna - 1990
- Ännu en härlig dag/Vandrar i ett regn (Always in the Rain) - 1991
- Som ett under (blev det sommar)/Min kärlekssång - 198?

=== EP records ===
- Thor Erics (Nu eller aldrig/En kärleksdesperado/Nu är julen här) - 1994
- Smakprov (Som om tiden stått still/En gammal god vän/Tusen små saker/Obotligt kär) – 1995

== Svensktoppen songs ==
- Sju ensamma kvällar - 1966
- Vit som en orkidé - 1970

=== Failed to enter Svensktoppen ===
- Den sommaren då - 1997
- En gammal go' vän - 1997
