= Be mig! Se mig! Ge mig! =

Studio album by Elisa's
- Released: January 30, 2013
- Genre: Dansband music
- Label: Lionheart

Elisa's chronology
Det sa klick! (2012)	Be mig! Se mig! Ge mig! (2013)	En gnistrande jul (2013)

Be mig! Se mig! Ge mig! is a 2013 studio album by Elisa's. The album peaked at number three on the Swedish Albums Chart.

== Track listing ==
1. Be mig! Se mig! Ge mig!
2. Take Me Home Country Roads
3. Sanna mina ord
4. När jag ser mig tillbaks
5. Det ska gudarna veta
6. Fångad av en blick från dig
7. Varje litet andetag
8. Morfars grammofon
9. Den känslan
10. Om du vill
11. Den som gick i dina kläder
12. Diamonds Are a Girls Best Friend
13. Lever min dröm

== Charts ==
Chart (2013)	Peak position
Swedish Albums (Sverigetopplistan)	3
