= Tre gringos =

Song by Just D
- Language: Swedish
- Released: 1995
- Genre: hip hop
- Label: Telegram
- Songwriter: Just D

Tre gringos (Three gringo's) is a song originally recorded by Just D on 1995 album Plast. Originally, the song had a doo-wop arrangement.

During the Grammis Awards ceremony in 1996 gala, Just D performed the song together with Thorleifs. The song was now turned into a dansband song with a saxophone arrangement. This version was also released as a single, topping the Swedish singles chart. The song also stayed at Svensktoppen for a total of 13 weeks between 16 March and 8 June 1996, peaking at second position.

The Just D and Thorleifs recording charted at Trackslistan for 9 weeks between 9 March and 4 May 1996.

Lyrical the song describes a group of people noticing an advertising for a saxophone, and travel with the Stockholm metro blueline from Fridhemsplan out to a suburb to buy it. Once there, they encounter a cultural life originating at warmer places, and the song lyrics describe modern life changing world, making people feel like it's "shrinking".

At Dansbandskampen 2008, the song was performed by Nizeguys.
