= Utan dina andetag =

1997 song by Kent

Song by Kent
- Language: Swedish
- A-side: "Om du var här"
- Released: 6 October 1997
- Studio: Ljudhavet (Stockholm, Sweden)
- Genre: Alternative rock
- Length: 4:23
- Label: RCA/UMG Sweden
- Songwriter: Joakim Berg
- Producer: Zed Smon

"Utan dina andetag" (lit. 'Without Your Breath') is a song by the Swedish rock band Kent. It was originally released in 1997 as a B-side to the single "Om du var här" (but not its English-translated version, "If You Were Here"). In 2000, it was included in the band's B-sides compilation, B-sidor 95–00.

The song slowly gained more popularity in the 2010s, and by 2016 it became Kent's most-streamed song on Spotify, as well as a wedding music staple in Sweden. Following Kent's six reunion concerts in March 2025, the song reached a new peak of No. 11 on the Swedish singles charts.

== Background ==
"Om du var här" was released on 6 October 1997 as the lead single to Kent's third studio album Isola. It was the first Kent album to have a corresponding English-translated version. "Utan dina andetag" was recorded in the Ljudhavet studio in Stockholm.

Despite lacking an official music video or single promotion, the song slowly became Kent's most popular. The romantic lyrics stood in opposite to Joakim Berg's more usual cynical, cryptic style. In 2016, "Utan dina andetag" was reported to be in the top-10 most popular wedding songs in Sweden.

== Covers ==
In 2010, Swedish singer Carolina Wallin Pérez covered "Utan dina andetag" for Pärlor och Svin, a Kent covers album. It was released as the album's lead single, and peaked at No. 30 on the Swedish singles charts.

Later in July 2010, Lisa Nilsson performed the song at the Stockholm Concert Hall to celebrate the wedding of Victoria, Crown Princess of Sweden, and Daniel Westling.

== Charts ==
Weekly chart performance for "Utan dina andetag"
Chart (2010)	Peak position
Sweden (Sverigetopplistan)	48

Chart (2016)	Peak position
Sweden (Sverigetopplistan)	53

Chart (2024–25)	Peak position
Sweden (Sverigetopplistan)	11
