= Sweet Kissin' in the Moonlight =

Single by Thorleifs

from the album Sweet Kissin' in the Moonlight: Den första kyssen
- A-side: "Sweet Kissin' in the Moonlight"
- Released: March 2009
- Genre: dansband music, schlager
- Songwriters: Lina Eriksson, Mårten Eriksson

Sweet Kissin' in the Moonlight is a song written by Lina Eriksson and Mårten Eriksson, and originally performed at Melodifestivalen 2009 where Lasse Stefanz was first asked to participate with the song, before they rejected in November 2008 to participate with the song, originally called Den första kyssen.

Instead, Thorleifs accepted the invitation, and participated in the fourth semifinal in Malmö on 28 February 2009, where it ended up 5th, and was knocked out of the competition.

The song was tested for Svensktoppen on 22 March 2009, but failed to enter the chart.

The single peaked 55th position at the Swedish singles chart.

== Charts ==
Chart (2009)	Peak position
Sweden (Sverigetopplistan)	55
