= Platina Records =

Swedish independent record label

- Founded: 1964; 62 years ago
- Founder: Evert Jakobsson
- Defunct: 1989; 37 years ago
- Status: Inactive
- Distributor: EMI Records
- Genre: Pop; rock; dansband; new wave; punk; synth-pop
- Country of origin: Sweden
- Location: Gothenburg, Sweden

Platina Records (Platina Skivor) was a Swedish independent record label founded in 1964 by businessman and songwriter Evert Jakobsson. The label saw great success throughout the mid-1960s with rock acts such as Tages, before turning to dansband music in the 1970s, gaining success with Flamingokvintetten and Thorleifs. After turning to pay to play in 1984, the label shut down in 1989.

== History ==
=== 1960s ===
During the early 1960s, Evert Jakobsson worked for Svenska Kullagerfabriken (SKF) as a computer technician. During his free time, he dreamed of becoming a teen idol, and as a result turned to music. He wrote two songs, "About Rita" and "You Sent Me A Rose", but unable to secure a recording contract, Jakobsson decided to register Platina Records as a company and almost immediately started pressing a batch of the single under the pseudonym Glenn Jackson and the Glentones. This was the first release on the record label but it failed to garner any major attention, both commercially and critically. This led to Jakobsson dropping his ambition to instead focus on running the label.

Jakobsson almost immediately focused on the blossoming Gothenburg music scene that had many popular bands that were unsigned. Tages was a band that had been the victim of extreme popularity, but hadn't been approached by any record labels. He decided to contact their manager Lars Fryklund for a meeting shortly after their victory in the Västkusens Beatles contest. Fryklund and drummer Freddie Skantze were optimistic to get signed which led to a two-and-a-half-year contract, much to the shock of Jakobsson who thought that they wouldn't sign with him. Jakobsson also produced their debut single, "Sleep Little Girl" as no other producers were present during the session. This single was both the group's and the label's breakthrough, reaching number one on Tio i Topp and three on Kvällstoppen.

The follow-up to "Sleep Little Girl", "I Should Be Glad" was also self-released by Platina. However, at the time the label wasn't assigned to any studio due to monetary restraints, which led to Jakobsson booking various studios for his label, including Metronome Records studio in Stockholm. Partly due to this, Jakobsson arranged for a deal with EMI Records, who would distribute the label's records from that point on. This deal also gave Jakobsson access to EMI's studio on Sandhamnsgatan in Stockholm which he promtply took advantage of. Jakobsson could now afford to manufacture more records which led to more and more commercial success, affording him two gold albums, Tages and Tages 2, both in 1966. Also in 1966, several singles released on the label also sold over 100.000 copies, most notably Tages "In My Dreams", which was a number one hit on both Tio i Topp and Kvällstoppen.

Tages would leave the label in January 1967, after their contract expired. The reason behind this was that Tages were offered a contract by another EMI sub-label, Parlophone Records, who could afford them more studio time and a bigger budget. Other rock bands were also signed around 1965–66, including the Pacifics, the Steelmen, Highway Gang and the Shakers. Most of these were unknown and commercially unsuccessful acts, with only the Shakers having a charting hit. After Tages, the biggest group Platina signed during the 1960s was Thor-Erics, a dansband who were signed in 1965. They had multiple entries on Svensktoppen, starting in 1966 with "Sju ensamma kvällar" which reached number five on that chart in August 1966. Flamingokvintetten were another dansband signed in 1966. They saw commercial success on Svensktoppen starting in 1967. Both bands released their debut albums in 1967, with both being produced by Jakobsson.

=== 1970s and 80s ===
By the late 1960s, the Swedish rock scene was almost completely gone, being instead replaced by progg groups or dansbands. Jakobsson decided to focus primarily on the dansband scene instead, finding it more commercially viable. Thor-Erics were still commercially successful on Svensktoppen throughout 1968–70 with songs such as "Vit som en orkidé" which reached number two on both Kvällstoppen and Svensktoppen in August 1970. Flamingokvintetten, who had two songs on Svensktoppen in 1968, one of which reached both Tio i Topp and Kvällstoppen, decided to leave the label in 1970 after forming their own record label Flam Records. Up until this point they had released four studio albums, all of which were produced by Jakobsson. Due to this, Platina released several unauthorized compilation albums of Flamingokvintetten's material throughout the 1970s, starting with 1971's Flamingos Bästa and ending with 1979's 20 Hits Med Flamingo.

By 1971 the label had signed several more dansband, including Tonix, Bert Bennys and Matz Bladhs. These all released records on the label to various degrees of commercial success. However, also in 1971, Thorleifs was signed to Platina due to the connection of manager Roddy Olofsson who was acquainted with Agnetha Fältskog. These were arguably the most commercially successful of all Platina artists, debuting on Svensktoppen with "I Mexicos land" which reached number nine. With the money earned by these releases, Jakobsson purchased a studio for the label, which he simply called Platina Studio which from 1972 onwards would be used for most of the label's releases. Thorleifs released their debut album Kommer hem till dig in 1973, which although failed to chart was a strong seller on the Swedish market. By this time the label was much more financially stable which meant that the partnership with EMI could be ended.

The label's arguably best selling albums were both by Thorleifs at the height of the dansband movement in Sweden. The first one was En dag i juni which was released in 1974. It was the first album by them to sell gold, selling an approximated 300,000 copies in Sweden and reached number two on Kvällstoppen that year. The second successful release was Gråt inga tårar, which was released the following year. This album also sold gold, and reached number one on VG-lista during that summer. However, due to contractual disagreements, Thorleifs left the label after recording Alltid tillsammans at Platina Studio, which was released under their own label Tor Records. Although the label also had success with Curt Haagers starting in 1975, the dansband craze had started waning towards the end of the decade, which contributed to Platina's decision to release the final dansband studio album in 1979, that being Canders Charlie.

By 1980, the label had ceased operation and reformed into a small pay to play label instead when operations once again started in 1984. The targeted format was 7-inch singles by smaller groups. In fact, during the label's last nine years in existence only three albums were released, these being Thorleifs 20 Godingar, Gunnar Karlsson's Våra Sköna Dansband 1 (Compilation) along with Tages Tages 1964–1968! The first release using this business model was Akut's "Vill ha dig" in 1984. Most of the artists releasing records on the label during this time had one thing in common was that most of them were local, obscure band who primarily played either punk rock, new wave or synth-pop. However, as many of these bands were obscure no commercial success could be garnered, and as such Platina became financially struck and Jakobsson finally decided to shut it down in 1989. The final release on the label was "Heroes" by 3 Miles From Here in that year.

== Discography ==
=== Albums ===
Year	Catalogue Number	Artist(s)	Album title
1965	PALP 3001	Tages	Tages
1966	PALP 3002	Tages	Tages 2
1966	PALP 3003	Tages	Extra Extra
1967	PALP 3004	Thor-Erics	Sju Trivsamma Kvällar Med Thor-Erics
1967	PALP 3005	Tages	The Best Of Tages (Compilation)
1967	PALP 3006	Flamingokvintetten	Harrli! Harrlå!
1968	PALP 3007	Tages	Forget Him (Compilation)
1968	PALP 3008	Flamingokvintetten	Ja' Går Ut Med Hunden! Sticker Ut Ett Slag ...
1968	PBLP 5002	Tages	The Best Of Tages (Compilation)
1969	PALP 3009	Flamingokvintetten	Chin Chin
1970	PALP 3010	Flamingokvintetten	Hälften Av Varje
1970	PALP 3011	Tonix	Hörru, Va' E' De'?
1971	PALP 3012	Flamingokvintetten	Flamingos Bästa (Compilation)
1971	PALP 3013	Thor-Erics	Försök Att Vara Lite Vänlig
1972	PALP 3014	Lill-Ingmars	Lill-Ingmars
1972	PALP 3015	Matz Bladhs	Bland Blommor Och Blad
1972	PALP 3016	Bert Bennys	Du
1972	PALP 3017	Thor-Erics	Vårt Strå Till Stacken
1973	PALP 3018	Nonnes	Lugn I Stormen
1973	PALP 3019	Chiquita Brass	Gamle Kompis
1973	PALP 3020	Zenits	Fröken Vår
1973	PALP 3021	Thorleifs	Kommer Hem Till Dig
1973	PALP 3022	Flamingokvintetten	Flamingos Bästa 2 (Compilation)
1973	PALP 3023	Thor-Erics	En Tidig Sönda' Morron
1973	PALP 3024	Macs	Som En Sång
1973	PALP 3025	Drifters	Kom Loss
1973	PALP 3026	Kennys	På Festplatsen
1973	PALP 3027	Peter Pan	Allt Beror På Dig
1974	PALP 3028	Thorleifs	En Dag I Juni
1974	PALP 3029	Tonix	Flyg Din Väg
1974	PALP 3030	Four Seven	Four Seven
1974	PALP 3032	Flamingokvintetten	Flamingos Bästa 3 (Compilation)
1974	PALP 3033	Lill-Ingmars	2:an
1974	PALP 3034	Hobsons	Nu E' De' Lörda' Igen
1974	PALP 3035	Bert Bennys	Aja Baja Anna-Maja
1974	PALP 3036	Drifters	Ikväll
1974	PALP 3037	Nonnes	Nära Dej
1974	PALP 3038	Kennys	Samling Vid Pumpen!
1974	PALP 3039	Thor-Erics	Vi Ses Igen
1975	PALP 3040	Thorleifs	Gråt Inga Tårar
1975	PALP 3041	Chiquita Brass	Här Igen!
1975	PALP 3042	Macs	Vår Andra
1975	PALP 3043	Hobsons	Vår Mascot
1975	PALP 3044	Four Seven	Hokus Pokus
1975	PALP 3045	Tonix	Vindens Melodi
1975	PALP 3046	Bennys	Tillsammans Igen
1975	PALP 3047	Curt Haagers	Ta Mej Me'...
1975	PALP 3048	Flamingokvintetten	Flamingos Bästa 4 (Compilation)
1975	PALP 3049	Milles	Låt Mig Få Krama
1975	PALP 3050	Lill-Ingmars	3:an
1975	PALP 3050	Nonnes	Vi Sticker Ut...
1975	PALP 3051	Tonix	Förlåt Mej Älskling
1975	PALP 3052	Kinells	Flottarkärlek
1975	PALP 3053	Drifters	Ett Äventyr Med Drifters
1975	PALP 3055	Bert Bennys	III
1975	PALP 3056	Kennys	Hänger Du Me'
1975	PALP 3057	Magnus	Dom Bästa Bitarna 1 (Compilation)
1975	PALP 3058	Four Seven	Bugga Loss
1975	PALP 3059	Curt Haagers	Goa 10-I-Topp Bitar 1 (Compilation)
1976	PALP 3060	Chiquita Brass	Gunga Me'
1976	PALP 3061	Hobsons	Säg, Får Jag Lov!
1976	PALP 3062	Thor-Erics	På Jakt Efter Dej
1976	PALP 3063	Milles	Det Bästa Jag Kan Få
1976	PALP 3064	Peter Pan	Anita
1976	PALP 3065	Magnus	Country 1
1976	PALP 3066	Bennys	Gott Humör
1976	PALP 3067	Kinells	2 - Vi Möts Igen
1976	PALP 3068	Various Artists	De Bästa Dansbanden 1 (Compilation)
1976	PALP 3069	Flamingokvintetten	Flamingos Bästa 6 (Compilation)
1976	PALP 3070	Carols	Svängiga Danslåtar 1
1976	PALP 3071	Bert Bennys	IV
1976	PALP 3072	Various Artists	De Bästa Dansbanden 2 (Compilation)
1976	PALP 3073	Hobsons	Let's Twist
1976	PALP 3074	Peter Pan	Goa 10 I Topp Bitar 2 (Compilation)
1976	PALP 3075	Tonix	Tonix' Bästa 1 (Compilation)
1977	PALP 3077	Magnus	Brustanta (Dom Bästa Bitarna 2) (Compilation)
1977	PALP 3078	Milles	3
1977	PALP 3079	Hux-Flux	Med LP:n Hej, Hej, Hej
1977	PALP 3080	Kitts	En För Alla
1977	PALP 3081	Rubb & Stubb	I Våran Gamla Chevrolet
1977	PALP 3082	Various Artists	De Bästa Dansbanden 3 (Compilation)
1977	PALP 3083	Bennys	Venus
1977	PALP 3084	Carols	Natten Har Sin Egen Saga
1977	PALP 3085	Rifflers	Party Time
1977	PALP 3086	Various Artists	De Bästa Dansbanden 4 (Compilation)
1977	PALP 3087	Magnus	Country 2
1977	PALP 3089	Milles	Knock Out!
1977	PALP 3090	Canders	Försök Förstå
1977	PALP 3091	Thor-Erics	Thor-Erics Bästa (Compilation)
1978	PALP 3092	Kitts	Alla Minnen
1978	PALP 3093	Kennys	När Sommaren Kommer
1978	PALP 3095	Tonix	Tonix' Bästa 2 (Compilation)
1979	PALP 3097	Canders	Charlie
1979	PALP 3098	Thor-Erics	Thor-Erics Bästa 2 (Compilation)
1979	PALP 3099	Ekelunds	Dansglädje 1
1979	PCLP 7501	Flamingokvintetten	20 Hits Med Flamingo (Compilation)
1980	PCLP 7503	Thorleifs	20 Godingar (Compilation)
1985	PCLP 8501	Gunnar Karlsson	Våra Sköna Dansband 1 (Compilation)
Double-albums
1983	7C 138-35954	Tages	Tages, 1964-68!

=== EPs ===
Year	Catalogue Number	Artist(s)	EP title
1965	PAEP 2001	Tages	Tages
1966	PAEP 2002	Tages	Sleep Little Girl
1966	PAEP 2003	Thor-Erics	En Liten Amulett
1966	PAEP 2004	Flamingokvintetten	Ingalunda-Lej
1967	PAEP 2005	Tages	Tages Hits Vol. 1
1967	PAEP 2006	Tages	Tages Hits Vol. 2
1967	PAEP 2007	Tages	Tages Hits Vol. 3
1967	PAEP 2008	Ann & Lill	Ann & Lill Sjunger Till Sam Brandts Orkester
1968	PAEP 2009	Flamingokvintetten	Äntligen
1971	PAEP 2010	Brita Borg	Göteborgs Melodi

== See also ==
- Lists of record labels
