= Elisa Lindström =

Swedish singer (born 1991)

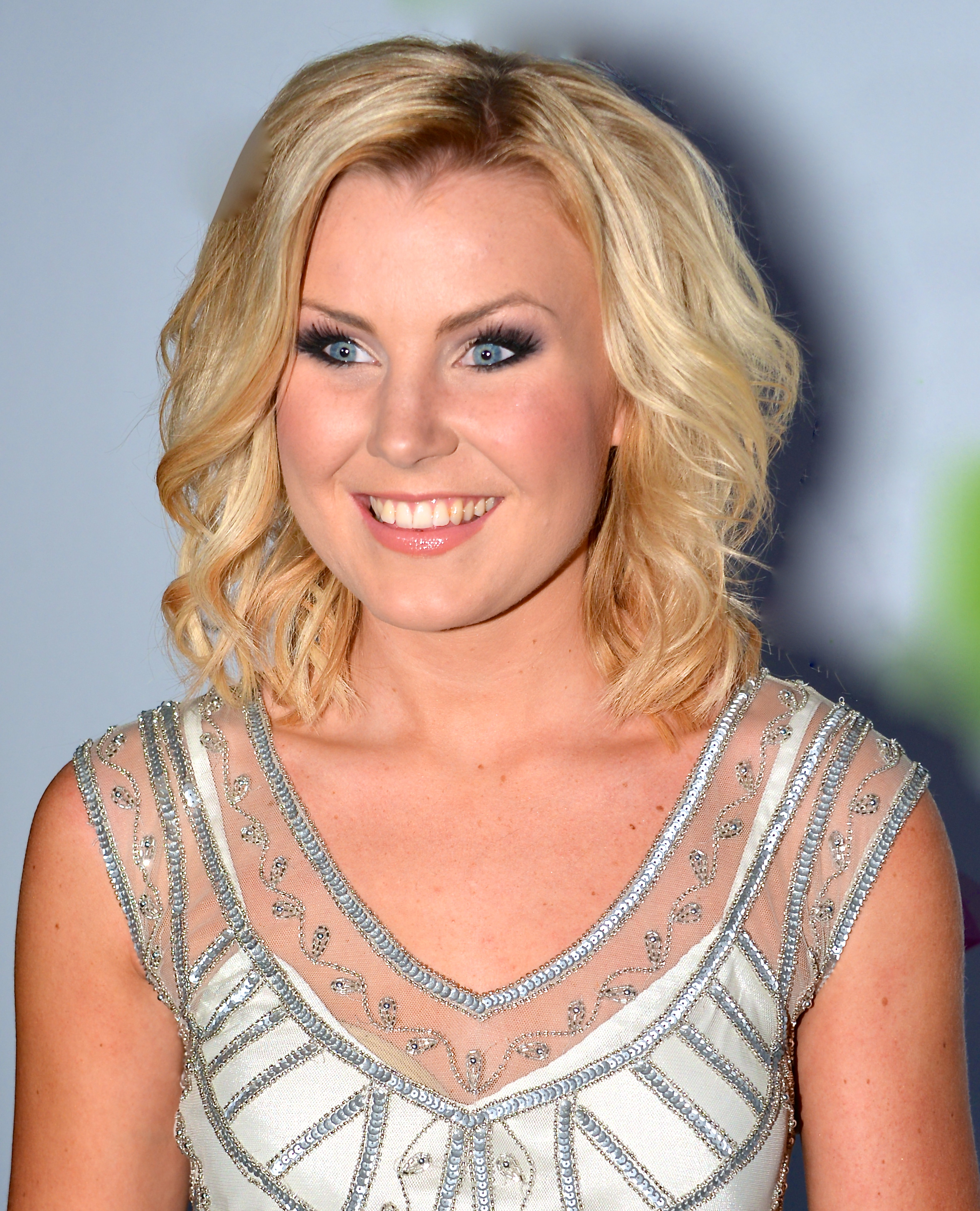
- Elisa Lindström (2013)

Background information
- Born: Eva Elisa Lindström; 24 April 1991 (age 35)
- Origin: Töreboda, Sweden
- Occupation: Singer
- Years active: 2006–present
- Member of: Elisa's
- Website: www.elisalindstrom.com

Eva Elisa Lindström (born 24 April 1991) is a Swedish pop and country music singer, and the lead singer for the dansband Elisa's.

== Career ==
As part of the music group Lali, she participated in Lilla Melodifestivalen in 2005, where their song titled "Du får ta mitt hjärta" (You can take my heart) finished in sixth place overall. The song was co-written by Elisa herself and her sister Alma Lindström.

The band Elisa's was formed in 2009 by Lindström and others from the same musical education program in a school in Skövde. In 2010, Lindström and Elisa's received national attention competing in the SVT danceband reality competition show Dansbandskampen (meaning "Battle of the Dancebands"), where her band qualified to the finals, eventually winning the contest in the final held on 11 December 2010. Lindström won "Singer of the Year 2011" at the Guldklaven Awards in early 2012.

In 2013, Lindström took part in the choir singing competition show Körslaget (meaning "Clash of the Choirs") broadcast on TV4, where she led a choir from her hometown of Töreboda. Lindström made it to the 19 October 2013 final where they competed against the other finalist, a choir led by singer Anna Book. Lindström won the final of Körslaget.

In November 2013 it was revealed that Lindström would participate in Melodifestivalen 2014 in hopes of representing Sweden in the Eurovision Song Contest 2014 in Copenhagen, Denmark. She competed in the first heat with the song "Casanova". She participated in Let's Dance 2016 which was broadcast on TV4, she won the final against Bianca Wahlgren Ingrosso. In 2016, she presented the danceband show Tack för dansen along with Thomas Deutgen, the show was broadcast on TV4.

Elisa participated in Melodifestivalen 2021 with her song "Den du är", which was eliminated in the semi-finals. She participated in Melodifestivalen 2024 with "Forever Yours"; she came second in the second voting round of her heat on 3 February 2024, qualifying for the run-off round of 2 March; there, she was ultimately eliminated.

== Personal life ==
Lindström lives in Töreboda.

== Discography ==
=== Solo albums ===
Title	Year	Peak chart positions
Title	Year	SWE
Leva	2014	13
Roses In The Rain	2017	—
Nu glittrar trädens kronor	2019	—

=== Singles ===
Title	Year	Peak chart positions	Album
Title	Year	SWE	Album
"Den du är"	2021	— (Note: "Den du är" did not enter the Swedish Singellista Chart, but peaked at number eight on the Swedish Heatseeker Chart.)	Non-album singles
"Forever Yours"	2024	99	Non-album singles
