= Åke Hallgren =

Swedish triple jumper

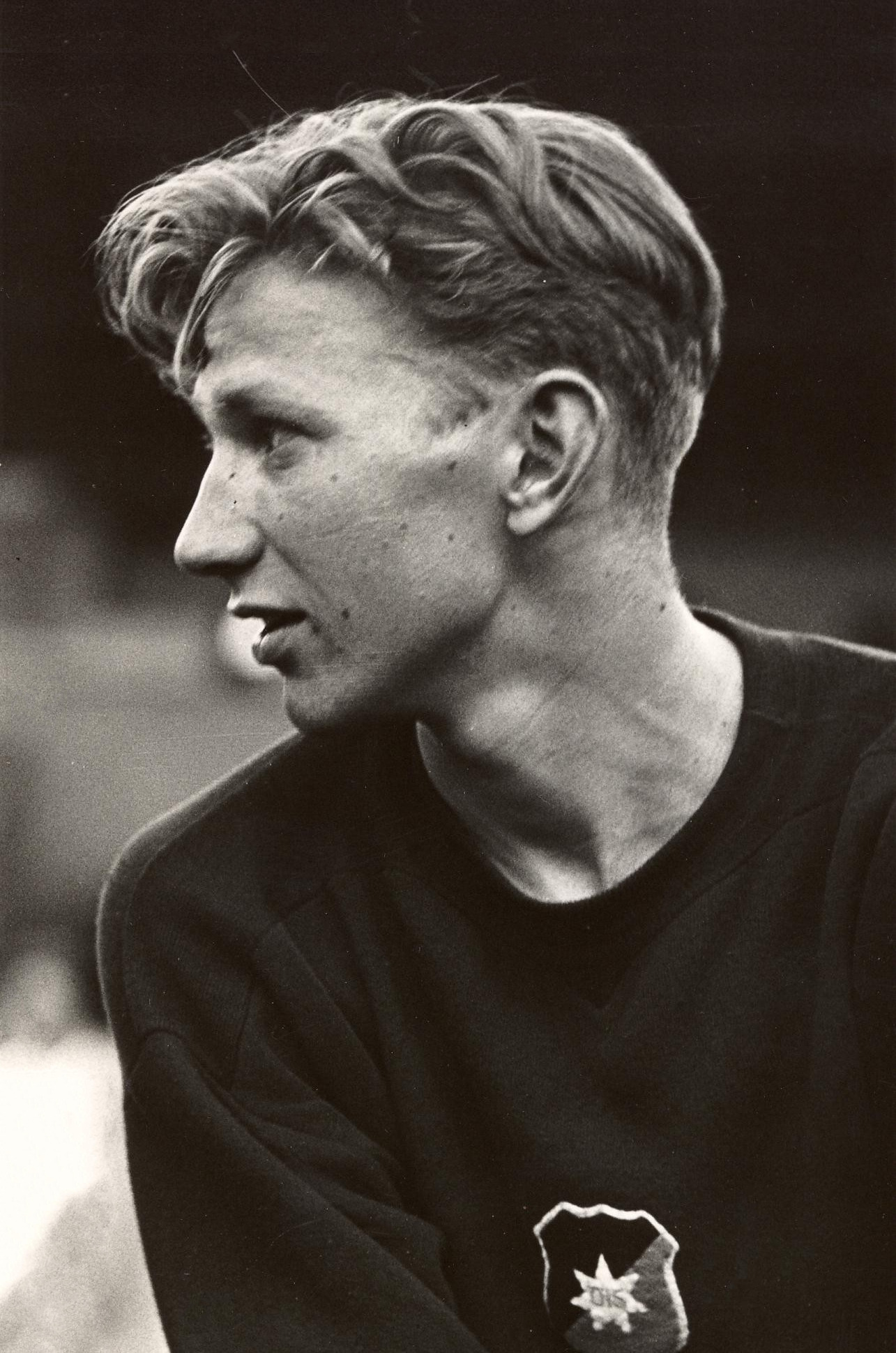

Personal information
- Born: 21 August 1918 Lidköping, Sweden
- Died: 17 June 2005 (aged 86) Lidköping, Sweden

Sport
- Sport: Athletics
- Event(s): Triple jump, decathlon
- Club: IF Sleipner

Achievements and titles
- Personal best(s): TJ – 15.10 m (1940); Decathlon – 6158 (1940)

Åke Vilhelm Bertil Hallgren (21 August 1918 – 17 June 2005) was a Swedish triple jumper. He competed at the 1948 Summer Olympics and finished in ninth place. He won the national titles in 1940, 1941 and 1945.
