= Plast (album) =

Studio album by Just D
- Released: 1995
- Genre: hip hop
- Length: 38:13
- Label: Telegram Stockholm
- Producer: Kaj Erixon

Just D chronology
Tre Amigos (1993)	Plast (1995)

Plast is a 1995 Just D studio album.

== Track listing ==
1. Sköna skor
2. 87-87
3. Din boss
4. Hubbabubba
5. Vi vinner - ni stinker
6. Bogeymannen
7. Tre gringos
8. Inte kul att va ful
9. D man inte vet
10. Tvångstankar
11. Plast

== Charts ==
Chart (1995)	Peak position
Sweden	3

== Certifications ==
Region	Certification	Certified units/sales
Sweden (GLF)	Gold	50,000^{^}
^{^} Shipments figures based on certification alone.
