= Just D =

Swedish hip hop group

JustD
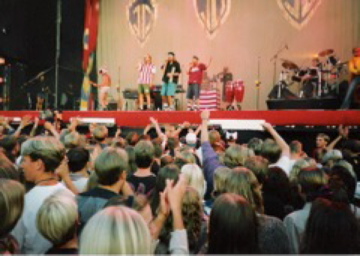
- JustD94 in 2012

Background information
- Origin: Stockholm, Sweden
- Genre: Hip hop
- Years active: 1990–1995
- Label: Telegram Records Stockholm
- Members: Gustave Lund; Wille Crafoord; Peder Ernerot

JustD (English: That's right) was a Swedish hip hop trio formed in Stockholm in 1990. The group consisted of Gustave Lund (Gurra G), Wille Crafoord (Doktor C) and Peder Ernerot (Pedda P). They had several chart successes during the early-mid 1990s.

Their contribution to the Swedish hip hop scene is significant because they were the first successful Swedish language rap act. Their dominance in the Swedish charts during the early 1990s opened up a new market in the Swedish music scene for artists who wished to record rap music in Swedish. Previously, prior to the success of Just D, Swedish rap artists used English rhymes in a bid to succeed in the international market. Just D showed that local chart success with Swedish rhymes was a lucrative market in and of itself.

Their first album were heavily influenced by De La Soul's 3 Feet High and Rising but after a few years the groups sound changed and they were marketed like the early incarnation of the Beastie Boys and they had the same impact on Sweden's popular music audience. They applied American hip hop rhythm & rhyme to Swedish pop music and their formula made hip hop trendy and palatable to new audiences. JustD's presentation of rap music had a certain irony and some might say parody to it. In their early albums, they also tended heavily to use Swedish record samples. In contrast to the majority of Swedish hip hop artists in the 1990s, none of the members in JustD had an immigrant background. The members of Just D came from affluent homes, and Wille Crafoord is a member of the archaic Swedish nobility. However, when the next wave of Swedish language rap music came, Swedish audiences had become ready for the rhymes of The Latin Kings, Infinite Mass, Petter, Blues and Feven.

== Discography ==
- 1 steg bak & 2 steg fram (1990)
- Svenska ord (1991)
- Rock N Roll (1992)
- Tre Amigos (1993)
- Plast (1995)
- Den Feladne Länken (2015)

=== Compilation albums ===
- JustD:s Gyldene (1995)
- Guldkorn (2006)

== See also ==
- Swedish hip hop
