= Safe in My Garden =

Single by The Mamas and the Papas

from the album The Papas & The Mamas
- B-side: "Too Late"
- Released: May 1968
- Recorded: 1968
- Genre: Folk rock
- Length: 3:10
- Label: Dunhill
- Songwriter: John Phillips
- Producer: Lou Adler

The Mamas and the Papas singles chronology
"Dancing Bear" (1967)	"Safe in My Garden" (1968)	"Dream a Little Dream of Me" (1968)

"Safe in My Garden" is a song written by John Phillips and recorded by The Mamas and the Papas. The single was briefly in the Top 100 pop chart in the United States. AllMusic.com calls the song "One of the group's finest latter-day records."

== The Mamas and the Papas ==
After Cass Elliot left the group temporarily in 1967, she returned in 1968 to complete their fourth album, The Papas & the Mamas. While the 1967 single "Twelve Thirty" appears on the album and was intended to be the first single for the fourth album, nearly a year had passed between its release and the completion of the remainder of the album, with two additional singles issued in order to keep the group in the minds of the American record buying public, "Glad to Be Unhappy" (a non-album single) and "Dancing Bear" culled from the group's second album. As a result, "Safe in My Garden" serves as something of a lead-off single for the album.

The song marks a departure for the group, as their signature folk-rock sound gives way to world-weary lyrics. Songwriter John Phillips, in the two years prior, had seen the group achieve great highs (six singles in the American Top 5 charts, a Grammy award, and enormous wealth and popularity) and extraordinary lows (Michelle Phillips' affairs with bandmate Denny Doherty and The Byrds' Gene Clark, Cass's departure, John's burgeoning drug addiction and added responsibility of becoming a father for the third time), and now outside the group, 1968 was a myriad protests, police brutality, and a world-weariness about the 1960s, in particular the Sunset Strip Riots. Despite the actual lyrics, the music is classic "Laurel Canyon" folk music, and has been described as "this bucolic, happy song."

Well known for their singers' harmonies, this is an especially beautiful example of how the Mamas and Papas blended their voices by "layering vocal lines over and under each other that almost breaks your heart." Billboard described the single as a "smooth, easy beat rhythm number with another exceptional vocal workout." Cash Box said it was a "pretty ballad" with "polished performance" and "adept arrangements." Despite reaching the Top Pop 100, as a "lead single" at the time, it was considered a failure for the band, leading to widespread rumors they were breaking up. However, since then, it has been included in virtually every one of their later compilation LPs and CDs, including Greatest Hits (1998), The Singles+, and All the Leaves Are Brown (both 2001). In 2014, the Knoxville News called the song number three out of the "Ten essential songs that everyone should hear."

Despite its hours of production and craftsmanship at John and Michelle Phillips' new home recording studio, the single was the first to miss the Top 40 of Billboard's Top 100 entirely, peaking at #53. The album from which the single was drawn, while still a hit, was considered a disappointment at the time: while all 3 prior albums and their Greatest Hits LP all became Top 5 smash hits, this album's highest chart position was #15.

== Other recordings ==
The song was also recorded in Swedish, as "En dag i juni", with lyrics by Britt Lindeborg. The Family Four recorded the song as a B-side for the single Kör långsamt (Cab Driver), released in November 1968. and on the 1969 album Kör långsamt. With these lyrics, the song was recorded by Thorleifs, releasing it as a single in 1973 and on the 1974 album with the same name The Swedish-language lyrics have an environmental-political message, tackling mankind 's ways of dealing with planet Earth.

== Charts ==
Chart (1968)	Peak position
US Billboard Hot 100	53
