= Thorleif Torstensson =

Swedish singer (1949–2021)

- Thorleif Torstensson sang and played the saxophone for Thorleifs
- Born: Sven Thorleif Georg Torstensson; 26 June 1949; Nottebäck, Sweden
- Died: 10 January 2021 (aged 71); Halmstad, Sweden
- Occupation: Musician
- Years active: 1962–2012

Sven Thorleif Georg Torstensson (26 June 1949 – 10 January 2021) was a Swedish singer, saxophonist and guitarist.

He was the lead singer of the danceband Thorleifs from its inception in 1962. Torstensson along with Thorleifs took part in Melodifestivalen 2009 with the song "Sweet Kissin' in the Moonlight". He took part as a celebrity contestant on Kändisdjungeln which was broadcast on TV4 in 2009.

Torstensson died on 10 January 2021, after a week of care of in a Halmstad hospital, from COVID-19.
