= Thorleifs =

Swedish dansband

- Origin: Norrhult, Sweden
- Genres: Dansband music
- Years active: 1962–2012
- Labels: Platina

Thorleifs was a Swedish dansband, formed in 1962 in Norrhult, Kronoberg County, Sweden and led by Thorleif Torstensson. The band sings in Swedish and many other languages, and released some albums in German. It also took part in Melodifestivalen 2009 with the song "Sweet Kissin' in the Moonlight" but did not proceed into the finals.

== Members ==
Guitar, lead vocals and saxophone

- Thorleif Torstensson (1962–2012)

Guitar and vocals

- Magnus Bergdahl (1968–2008)
- Bosse Thyren (2011–2012)

Drums and vocals

- Åke Eriksson (1962–1970)
- Jörgen Löfstedt (1970–2012)

Bass

- Bo Ehrenmo (1962–1969)
- Kim Lindahl (1969–2012)

Keyboards and accordion

- Johan Möller (1962–1991)
- Bert Månson (1991–1993)
- Johan Bergerfalk (1993–2004)
- Magnus Franzén (2004–2011)
- Magnus Håkansson (2011–2012)

Keyboards, guitar and saxophone

- Hans Magnusson (1962–2012)

Trumpet and vocals

- Anders Kjell (1962–1969)

== Discography ==
=== Studio albums ===
- Kommer hem till dig (1973)
- En dag i juni (1974)
- Gråt inga tårar (1975)
- Skänk mig dina tankar (1976)
- Alltid tillsammans (1976)
- 72 till 75 (1977)
- Du bara du (1977)
- Kurragömma (1978)
- Sköt om dej (1979)
- 12 Golden Hits (1979)
- När dina ögon ler (1980)
- Johnny Blue (1981)
- Aurora (1982)
- Till Folkets park (1987)

Saxgodingar series

- Saxgodingar instrumentalt (1981) (LP)
- Saxgodingar 2 (1983) (LP)
- Saxgodingar 3 (1987) (CD)
- Historien Thorleifs saxgodingar (1996) (CD)
- Saxgodingar 4 (1998)

CDs

- Stadens ende speleman (1988)
- Halva mitt hjärta (1989)
- Tillsammans (1991)
- Med dej vill jag leva (1992)
- Och du tände stjärnorna (1994)
- Historien Thorleifs (1995)
- På opfordring (1995)
- En liten ängel (1997)
- En lille engel (1997)
- En liten ängel – Live i Lillehammer (1997)
- Thorleifs jul (1998)
- Thorleifs karaoke (1998)
- På opfordring 2 (1999)
- Ingen är som du (2000)
- Mit dir will ich leben (2002)
- Thorleifs Hit Collection (2002)
- Våra bästa år (2007)
- Förälskade (2008)
- Sweet Kissin' in the Moonlight: Den första kyssen (2009)
- Thorleifs största hits (2010)
- Golden Sax Love Songs (2011)
- Tack & farväl (2012)
- Golden Sax Swing – Vi möts igen (2014)
