= Arvidson =

Arvidson is a surname of Swedish origin. Notable people with the surname include:

- Bertil Arvidson (1921–2004), Swedish diplomat
- Linda Arvidson (1884–1949), American actress
- Kenneth Owen Arvidson (1938–2011), New Zealand poet
- Theodor Arvidson (1883–1964), Swedish bishop

== See also ==
- Arvidsson
