= Carl Swartz (diplomat) =

Swedish diplomat (1920–2008)

- Swartz circa 1963
- Born: Carl Petter Eson Swartz; 4 December 1920; Stockholm, Sweden
- Died: 5 March 2008 (aged 87); Stockholm, Sweden
- Education: Stockholm University College
- Occupations: Diplomat, businessman
- Years active: 1945–1990s
- Employer: SEB Group (1981–91)
- Spouse(s): Jocelyn Marshall (m. 1949–1956) Ulla Silfverschiöld (m. 1957)
- Children: 5
- Relatives: Carl Swartz (grandfather)

Carl Petter Eson Swartz (4 December 1920 – 5 March 2008) was a Swedish diplomat with a long career in foreign service and international trade relations. He joined Sweden's Ministry for Foreign Affairs in 1945 and held various diplomatic and trade-related posts, including vice consul in Bombay and assignments in Paris and Bonn. He played an active role in European economic cooperation, chairing committees within the OEEC and EFTA during the 1950s and early 1960s. In 1964, he became director and deputy head of the Trade Department at the Ministry for Foreign Affairs. After a brief period in the banking sector in West Germany, he returned to diplomacy and served as ambassador to Lagos (with concurrent accreditation to several West African capitals) from 1966 to 1969.

Swartz was appointed ambassador to Mexico City in 1972, serving until 1980. During his eight years in Mexico, he worked extensively to strengthen economic and trade relations between Sweden and Mexico and contributed to key bilateral agreements during President José López Portillo's 1980 state visit to Sweden. He developed close ties with Mexican political and industrial leaders and supported the expansion of Swedish industry in Mexico. He later served briefly as ambassador to Copenhagen (1980–1981). After leaving government service, he headed SEB's representative office in Mexico City and later acted as a special adviser to the bank in Stockholm. Swartz also held numerous board positions in Swedish and Mexican companies, particularly during a period of strong Swedish industrial growth in Mexico.

== Early life ==
Swartz was born on 4 December 1920 in Hedvig Eleonora Parish, Stockholm, Sweden, the son of the genealogist and officer Erik Swartz (1887–1963) and Märta (née Frisk). His grandfather was the civil servant, businessman, and politician Carl Swartz (1858–1926), who served as prime minister of Sweden in 1917. His great-grandfather was the industrialist, member of parliament, and politician Erik Swartz (1817–1881), and his great-great-grandfather was the manufacturer Johannes "John" Swartz (1790–1853).

Swartz completed his secondary education in 1938, earned his reserve officer's commission in 1942, and received a Candidate of Law degree from Stockholm University College in 1944.

== Career ==
Swartz joined the Ministry for Foreign Affairs in 1945 as an attaché. He served as vice consul in Bombay from 1945 to 1948, returned to the ministry in 1948, and worked as secretary in trade negotiations with various countries between 1948 and 1949. From 1949 to 1954, he was legation secretary at the OEEC delegation in Paris. He served as acting second secretary at the ministry from 1954 to 1955 and as acting first secretary from 1955 to 1959. Between 1957 and 1960, he chaired the OEEC's Atomic Trade Committee. From 1959 to 1963, he was first secretary with the rank of trade counsellor in Bonn, and from 1959 to 1960 he also chaired EFTA's Committee on Rules of Origin and Trade Matters.

In 1964, Swartz was appointed Director (Utrikesråd) and Deputy Head of the Trade Department at the Ministry for Foreign Affairs. He was placed at the government's disposal later that year and became director of Deutsche Unionbank in Frankfurt in 1965. He returned to service at the ministry in 1966 and was appointed ambassador to Lagos, serving from 1966 to 1969, with concurrent accreditation to Accra (1967–1969), Niamey (1967–1969), Ouagadougou (1967–1969), and Porto-Novo (1968–1969).

From 1969 to 1972, he served as director (utrikesråd) in the ministry's negotiating group. During the same period, he was a member of the Government Commission for Export Promotion (exportfrämjandeutredningen) and of the national committee for the United Nations Conference on the Human Environment. He was appointed ambassador to Mexico City, serving from 1972 to 1980.

During his eight years as ambassador to Mexico, Swartz worked intensively to lay the groundwork for stronger economic relations between Sweden and Mexico. On behalf of the Swedish government, he helped initiate the far-reaching declarations on trade and technological cooperation issued during Mexican President José López Portillo's state visit to Sweden in May 1980. Swartz was a personal friend of President López Portillo.

In Mexico, Swartz established a position that opened doors to leading circles on behalf of Sweden and Swedish interests. His deep knowledge of the country and close ties to key decision-makers provided privileged insight and access to Mexican political and industrial environments that were otherwise rarely open to foreigners. At the time, the embassy served as a meeting place and focal point for a large and active Swedish community during a golden era for Swedish industry, when Swedish companies were newly establishing themselves or expanding in Mexico and trade was steadily increasing.

He served as ambassador to Copenhagen from 1980 to 1981 and was again placed at the government's disposal in 1981. From 1981 to 1987, he headed SEB's representative office in Mexico City, and from 1987 to 1991 he was a special adviser to SEB in Stockholm. Swartz also held numerous board positions. He was chairman of the board of Fläkt de Mexico (1983–1992), board member of Atlas Copco Mexicana (1982–1992), ASEA S.A. de C.V. (1982–1987), ABB S.A. de C.V. (1987–1992), ASSAB de Mexico (1982–1986), and Axel Johnson de Mexico (1982–1984). From 1993 onward, he served as chairman of the board of Nordcell AB.

== Personal life ==
Swartz was married from 1949 to 1956 to Jocelyn Marshall (1928–2012), the daughter of director Clifford Marshall and Clarice (née Stille). They had two children: Eric Carl Gilchrist (1950–2011) and Clarice Aileen "Risë" Gilchrist (1954–2016).

In 1957, he married to Ulla Silfverschiöld (born 1932), the daughter of Baron Carl-Otto Silfverschiöld (1899–1955) and Madeleine (née Bennich). They had three children: Carl-Otto (born 1958), Madeleine (born 1960), and Carl-Fredrik (born 1968).

== Death ==
Swartz died on 5 March 2008 in Oscar Parish, Stockholm, Sweden. The funeral service was held on 10 April 2008 in Oscar's Church in Stockholm.

== Awards and decorations ==
- (Sweden) Knight of the Order of the Polar Star (1967)

Diplomatic posts
Preceded by Marc Giron	Ambassador of Sweden to Nigeria; 1966–1969	Succeeded by Bertil Arvidson
Preceded by Karl Henrik Andersson	Ambassador of Sweden to Upper Volta; 1967–1969	Succeeded by Bertil Arvidson
Preceded by Olof Ripa	Ambassador of Sweden to Ghana; 1967–1969	Succeeded by Bertil Arvidson
Preceded by None	Ambassador of Sweden to Niger; 1967–1969	Succeeded by Bertil Arvidson
Preceded by Karl Henrik Andersson	Ambassador of Sweden to Dahomey; 1968–1969	Succeeded by Bertil Arvidson
Preceded by Carl-Henric Nauckhoff	Ambassador of Sweden to Mexico; 1972–1980	Succeeded by Karl-Anders Wollter
Preceded by Tord Hagen	Ambassador of Sweden to Denmark; 1980–1981	Succeeded by Claës Ivar Wollin
