= Bengt Hambraeus =

Swedish composer (1928–2000)

Bengt Hambraeus (29 January 1928 – 21 September 2000) was a Swedish-Canadian organist, composer and musicologist.

== Biography ==
Hambraeus was born in Stockholm. He studied organ with Alf Linder and musicology with Carl-Allan Moberg, earning his doctorate in 1956 on a thesis about medieval musical notation. From 1957 to 1972 he worked at the music department of the Swedish Radio, eventually holding executive and producer posts, and during this time became a very high-profile emissary of new music in Sweden, encouraging discussion of new musical forms, a renewal of organ music with new tonal/technical concepts and the integration of performance art, improvisation, live electronics and stereo/spatial effects into traditional concert performing. He was also a prolific composer.

In 1972 he became professor of composition at McGill University, Montreal, and he remained in Canada until his death in Glen Roy, Ontario, in 2000. Among his notable pupils are composer Peter Allen and pianist Richard Hunt.

He was elected into the Royal Swedish Academy of Music in 1967 and received the Swedish Royal Medal Litteris et Artibus in 1986.

Hambraeus wrote music for a large number of instruments, but he is perhaps best known for his organ works. Together with Mauricio Kagel and György Ligeti he was among the first to use high modernist compositional methods to compose organ music. Limelight Records released his Constellations and Interferences on LP.

== Selected works ==
- 1958 Constellations I
- 1959 "constellations II for organ sounds" (Lp Cat No. Philips 838 750 AY)
- 1961-62 Interferenzen (interferences for the organ) Lp Cat No. Philips 838 750 AY
- 1966-67 Tre Pezzi per Organo
- 1969 Nebulosa
- 1974 Ricercare per organo
- 1981 Livre d'orgue (4 volumes)
- 1992 Missa pro organo: in memoriam Olivier Messiaen
- 1998 Quintette pour clarinette et quatuor à cordes, le tombeau de Max Reger
- 1999 Riflessioni per organo grande
