= Arvidsson =

Arvidsson is a Swedish surname. Notable people with the surname include:

- Agnes Arvidsson (1875–1962), Swedish pharmacist
- Elin Arvidsson (born 1992), Swedish professional golfer
- Eric Arvidsson or Eric Trolle (1460–1530), elected regent of Sweden in 1512 during the era of Kalmar Union
- Eva Arvidsson (born 1948), Swedish politician
- Gösta Arvidsson (1925–2012), Swedish shot putter
- Inga-Stina Arvidsson (1919–1999), Anglo-Swedish political activist
- Isak Arvidsson (born 1992), Swedish tennis player
- Jesper Arvidsson (born 1985), Swedish football player
- Lillemor Arvidsson (1943–2012), Swedish trade union leader, Governor of Gotland 1998–2004
- Lina Arvidsson (born 1981), Swedish author
- Magnus Arvidsson (athlete) (born 1983), Swedish javelin thrower
- Magnus Arvidsson (footballer) (born 1973), Swedish football player
- Margareta Arvidsson (born 1947), 1966 Miss Universe
- Mats Arvidsson (born 1958), Swedish football player
- Pär Arvidsson (born 1960), Swedish swimmer
- Per-Olof Arvidsson (1864–1947), Swedish sport shooter
- Sofia Arvidsson (born 1984), Swedish tennis player
- Torbjörn Arvidsson (born 1968), Swedish football player
- Viktor Arvidsson (born 1993), Swedish ice hockey player

== See also ==
- Arvidson (disambiguation)
- Arwidsson
