= Fagius =

Fagius is a surname. Notable people with the surname include:

- Hans Fagius (born 1951), Swedish organist
- Paul Fagius (1504–1549), German scholar
