= Elevation (liturgy) =

Christian liturgical practice

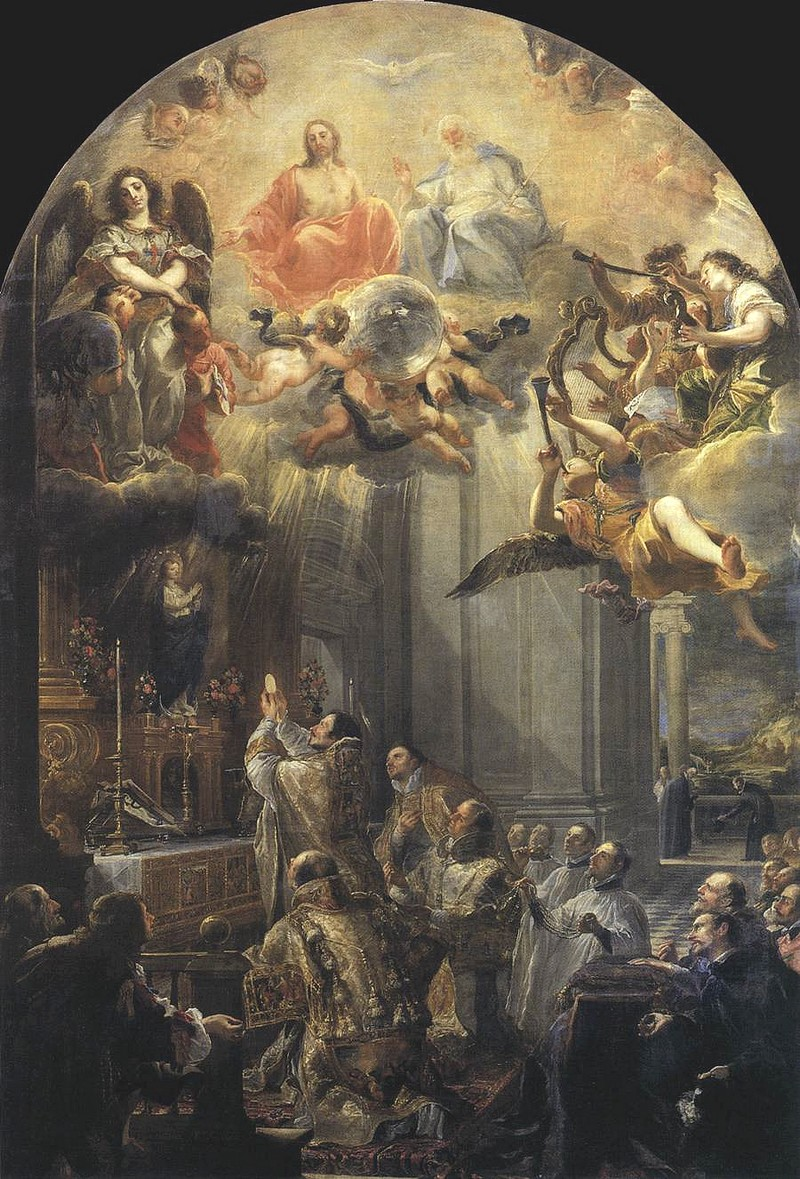
Elevation of the Host, with vision of St John of Matha, painting by Juan Carreño de Miranda, 1666

In Eastern and Western Christian liturgical practice, the elevation is a ritual raising of the consecrated Sacred Body and Blood of Christ during the celebration of the Eucharist. The term is applied especially to the Sacred Body of Christ (Host) and the chalice containing the Most Precious Blood of Christ being lifted up and shown to the congregation immediately after each is consecrated, in the Mass, both in the Roman Rite of the Catholic Church and in the Lutheran Churches. The term may also refer to a musical work played or sung at that time. The consecration has been historically accompanied by the ringing of the church bells.

== Background ==
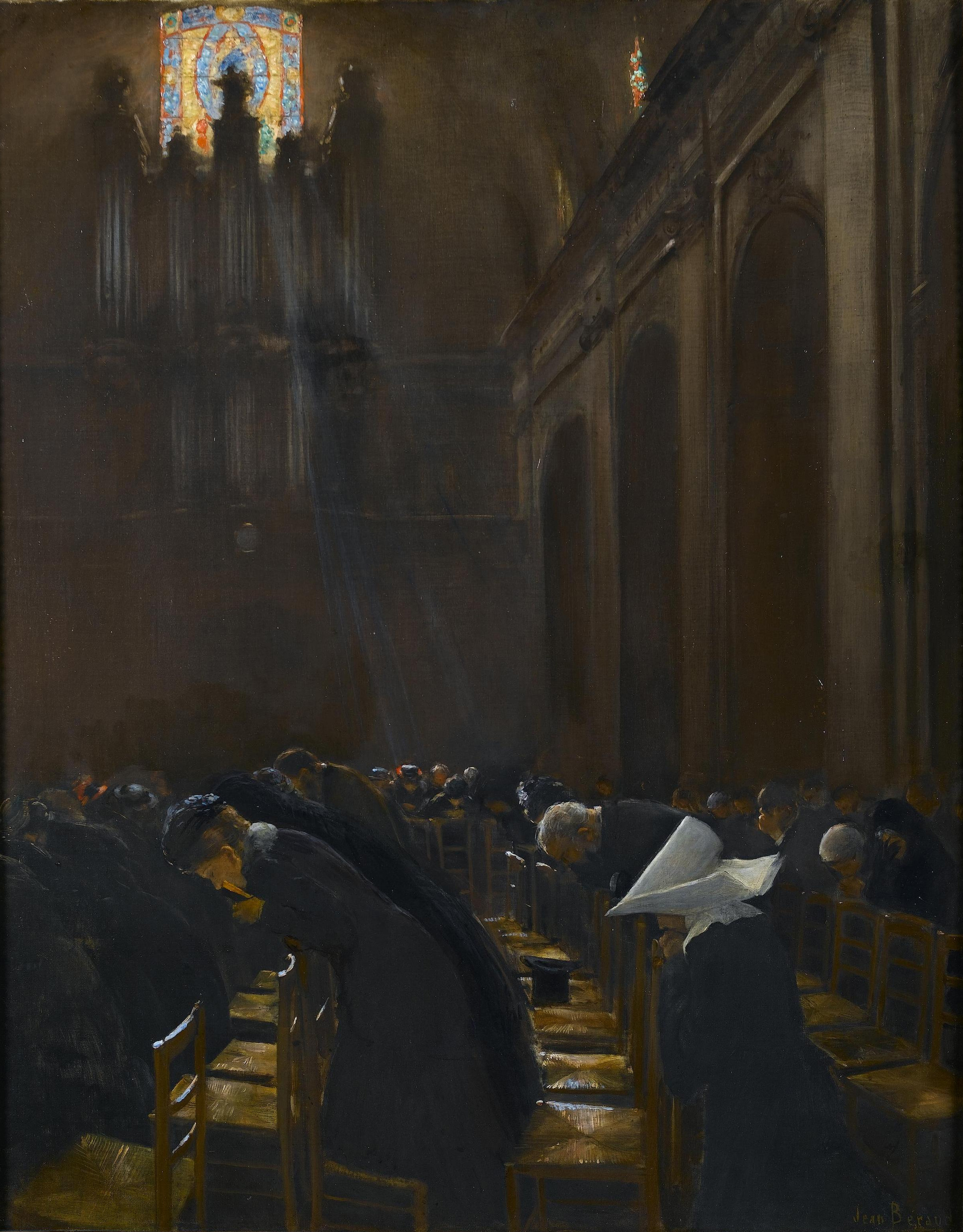
The Elevation of the Host by French painter Jean Béraud (1849–1936)

Some Christian liturgies have an elevation of the Blessed Sacrament, prior to the Rite of Communion, which shows the congregation, as an act of reverence, Whom they are about to receive. The Elevation was already practiced at the time of the Apostolic Constitutions.

In the Byzantine Rite, this elevation takes place as the last ekphonesis, i. e. audible exclamation, by the priest before Communion. He raises the Lamb (Host) slightly above the diskos (paten) and exclaims: Τὰ ἅγια τοῖς ἁγίοις, i.e. The holy (consecrated) things (the Body and Blood of Christ) for the holy (consecrated) people. In response the people, or rather the choir, acclaim: "One is holy, one Lord, Jesus Christ in the glory of God the Father" or similar words. The phrase "The holy things for the holy people" is found in the Apostolic Constitutions, and also in the Mozarabic Rite, but at a different point.

In the Roman Rite of Mass, this elevation is accompanied by the words Ecce Agnus Dei. Ecce qui tollit peccata mundi (Behold the Lamb of God. Behold him who takes away the sins of the world), echoing the words of John the Baptist in John 1:29.

== Byzantine Rite ==
A similar adoration of the Holy Mysteries occurs when communion is brought out to the faithful. The priest hands the chalice to the deacon, who raises it on high as he comes out through the Holy Doors and exclaims: "In the fear of God and with faith draw near." At this moment, everyone present makes a prostration (unless it is a Sunday or a Feast Day, in which case they simply make a bow at the waist) and the choir sings: "Blessed is he that cometh in the name of the Lord; God is the Lord and hath appeared unto us."

The only other ceremonial elevation of the chalice after the consecration in the Eastern Churches occurs after the communion of the faithful. The priest lifts the chalice and makes the Sign of the Cross with it over the antimension as he says quietly, "Blessed is our God...". He then turns towards the faithful, raises the chalice—which still contains the consecrated Body and Blood of Christ—as and says the rest of the blessing aloud: "...Always, now and ever, and unto the ages of ages." The choir responds: "Let our mouths be filled with Thy praise, O Lord, that we may chant of Thy glory. For Thou hast made us worthy to partake of Thy holy, divine, immortal, and life-giving Mysteries. Establish Thou us in Thy Holiness, that all the day long we may meditate upon Thy righteousness. Alleluia, alleluia, alleluia!"

In the Liturgy of St. John Chrysostom, the Lamb is also elevated just before the closing of the curtains on the iconostasis prior to Communion when the Priest declares: "The Holy Things are for the Holy" and the faithful respond: "One is Holy, one is the Lord Jesus Christ, to the Glory of God the Father, Amen." The Pre-Communion prayers are then said by the chanter(s) while the Bishop(s), Priest(s) and Deacon(s) receive communion in the sanctuary.

== Roman Rite ==
=== Post-consecration elevations ===
The purpose of the two elevations by which, first, the Host and, then, the Chalice are raised after the priest has pronounced the Words of Institution is indicated in the rubrics of the Roman Missal, which even for the Tridentine Mass direct the priest to "show to the people" the Host and the Chalice.

Raising above the level of the priest's head is necessary for the priest, without turning around, to show the consecrated element to the people, when these are behind him. Accordingly, the Tridentine Roman Missal instructs the priest to raise the Host or Chalice as high as he comfortably can.

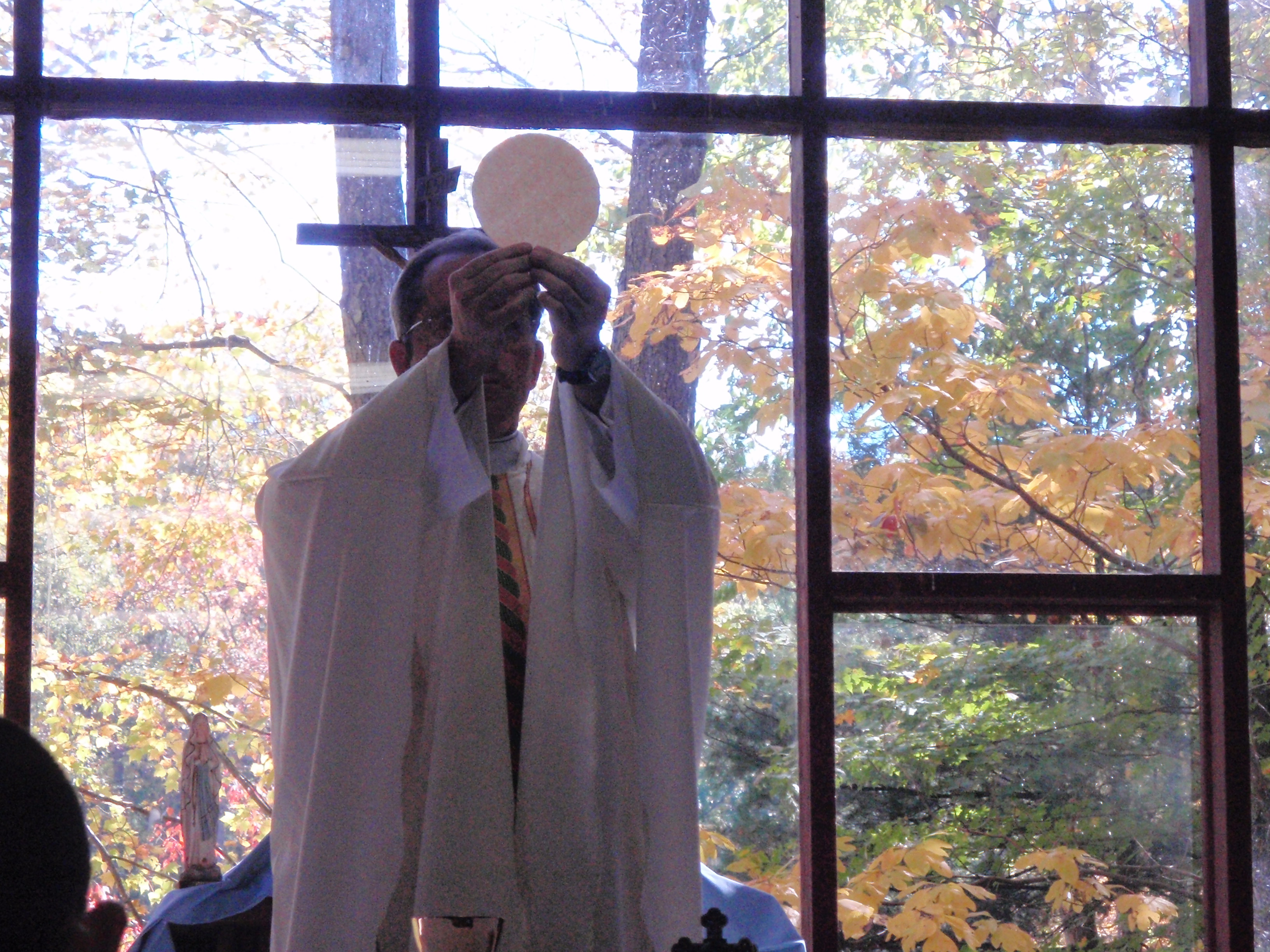
A Legionary priest during the elevation at an ECyD camp in Ohio.

These elevations are a late medieval introduction into the Roman Rite. The custom began in northern Europe and was accepted in Rome only in the fourteenth century. At first, the only elevation at this point was that of the Host, and not of the Chalice. The first bishop known to have ordered the showing of the Host was Bishop Eudes de Sully of Paris (1196–1208). This custom spread rapidly, but that of showing the Chalice appeared only later and was not universal and has never been adopted by the Carthusians. Genuflections to accompany the elevations appeared still later and became an official part of the rite only with Pope Pius V's Roman Missal of 1570.

The purpose of the showing of the Host to the people is that they may adore it. By the twelfth century it was for this purpose raised from the surface of the altar to the level of the priest's breast, while he said the words of consecration. For fear that people would adore the Host even before the consecration, the thirteenth century saw bishops forbidding priests to lift it to the sight of others before actually pronouncing the words. The practice of elevating the Host clearly into their sight immediately after the consecration was intended as sign that the change from bread to the Body of Christ had occurred at that stage, against the view of those who held that the change occurred only when the bread and the wine had both been consecrated.

The showing of the Host and the actual sight of it attracted immense attention. Stories of the privileges to be gained thereby became widespread: "Sudden death could not befall him. He was secure from hunger, infection, the danger of fire, etc." "Heave it higher, Sir Priest" was the cry of those who were anxious to view the elevation, or "Hold, Sir Priest, hold". It was apparently for the purpose of enabling people to come into the church for the short time necessary to see the elevation of the Host that the ringing of a warning bell was introduced. David Aers writes: "The late medieval mass was for the vast majority of Christians a spectacle where pious attendance at the display of Christ's body guaranteed a range of benefits endlessly reiterated." "[T]he Host was something to be seen, not to be consumed," explains Eamon Duffy, "the high point of lay experience of the Mass."

==== Elevation candle ====
Until 1960, the Tridentine form of the Roman Missal laid down that at the Epistle side of the altar a candle should be placed that was to be lit at the elevation. In practice, except in monasteries and on special occasions, this had fallen out of use long before Pope John XXIII replaced the section on the general rubrics of the Roman Missal with his Code of Rubrics, which no longer mentioned this custom.

The candle was called the elevation candle, the consecration candle or the Sanctus candle.

The purpose for lighting a candle or torch at this point was to enable people in ill-lit churches to see the Host as it was raised, the same reason that led to placing behind the altar a dark hanging to offer a distinct contrast to the white Host.

Medieval miniatures often show the elevation of the Host with the altar server lifting the priest's chasuble to help secure the maximum elevation by taking some of the weight of the vestment, while at the same time holding aloft a long rod topped with a lighted candle to about the same height as the raised Host.

=== Per ipsum ... omnis honor et gloria ===
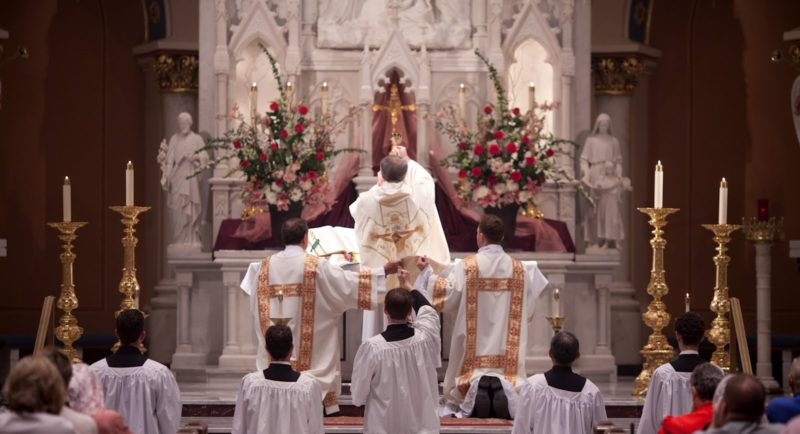
A priest raises the chalice during the elevation in a celebration Ad orientem

A more ancient elevation of Host and Chalice occurs in the Mass of the Roman Rite while the priest speaks the concluding doxology of the Eucharistic Prayer: Per ipsum et cum ipso et in ipso est tibi Deo Patri omnipotenti in unitate Spiritus Sancti omnis honor et gloria per omnia saecula saeculorum (Through him, and with him, and in him, O God, almighty Father, in the unity of the Holy Spirit, all glory and honour is yours, for ever and ever).

The presence in the Roman Rite of this elevation can be traced back at least to the ninth century.

In the Tridentine Mass form, the Host and Chalice are raised only slightly, and for the duration of only four short words, omnis honor et gloria. In the post-1970 form, the elevation lasts for the whole of the final doxology and indeed also during the Amen with which the people respond to the Eucharistic Prayer, and the height to which the paten with the Host and the Chalice are elevated is not limited by the rubrics.

In the present form of the rite, the priest elevates the paten with the Host and the Chalice while singing or saying the doxology., the deacon, if there is one, raises the Chalice. If there is no deacon, then in a concelebrated Mass one of the concelebrants takes the place of the deacon. Otherwise the celebrating priest raises both Host and Chalice together.

=== Ecce Agnus Dei ===
The third of the three occasions in the Mass of the Roman Rite on which the priest holds up the consecrated Host is at Holy Communion. Before receiving Communion himself and before distributing Communion to others, the priest "shows the faithful the Eucharistic Bread, holding it over the paten or over the chalice, and invites them to the banquet of Christ". In doing so, he says: Ecce Agnus Dei, ecce qui tollit peccata mundi. Beati qui ad cenam Agni vocati sunt (Behold the Lamb of God. Behold him who takes away the sins of the world. Blessed are those called to the supper of the Lamb). And again, when distributing Communion, "the Priest raises a host slightly and shows it to each of the communicants, saying (in the post-Vatican II Mass): 'The Body of Christ'."

=== Note on the offertory of the Tridentine Mass ===
In the offertory of the Tridentine Mass the priest elevates the paten with the unconsecrated host and the chalice with the unconsecrated wine to breast level in the case of the paten, while the height to which the chalice is to be raised is not specified, while saying prayers of offering "this immaculate victim" and "the chalice of salvation".

The later form of the Roman Missal avoids the use of similar prayers of offering in anticipation of the Eucharistic Prayer and even gestures that could be interpreted as gestures of offering mere bread and wine. When saying the prayers that accompany the placing on the altar of the paten with the bread and the chalice with the wine, the priest is told to hold them only "slightly raised".

== Evangelical-Lutheran practice ==
An Evangelical-Lutheran priest of the Church of Sweden elevates the Host during the celebration of High Mass at the Church of the Holy Trinity in Uppsala

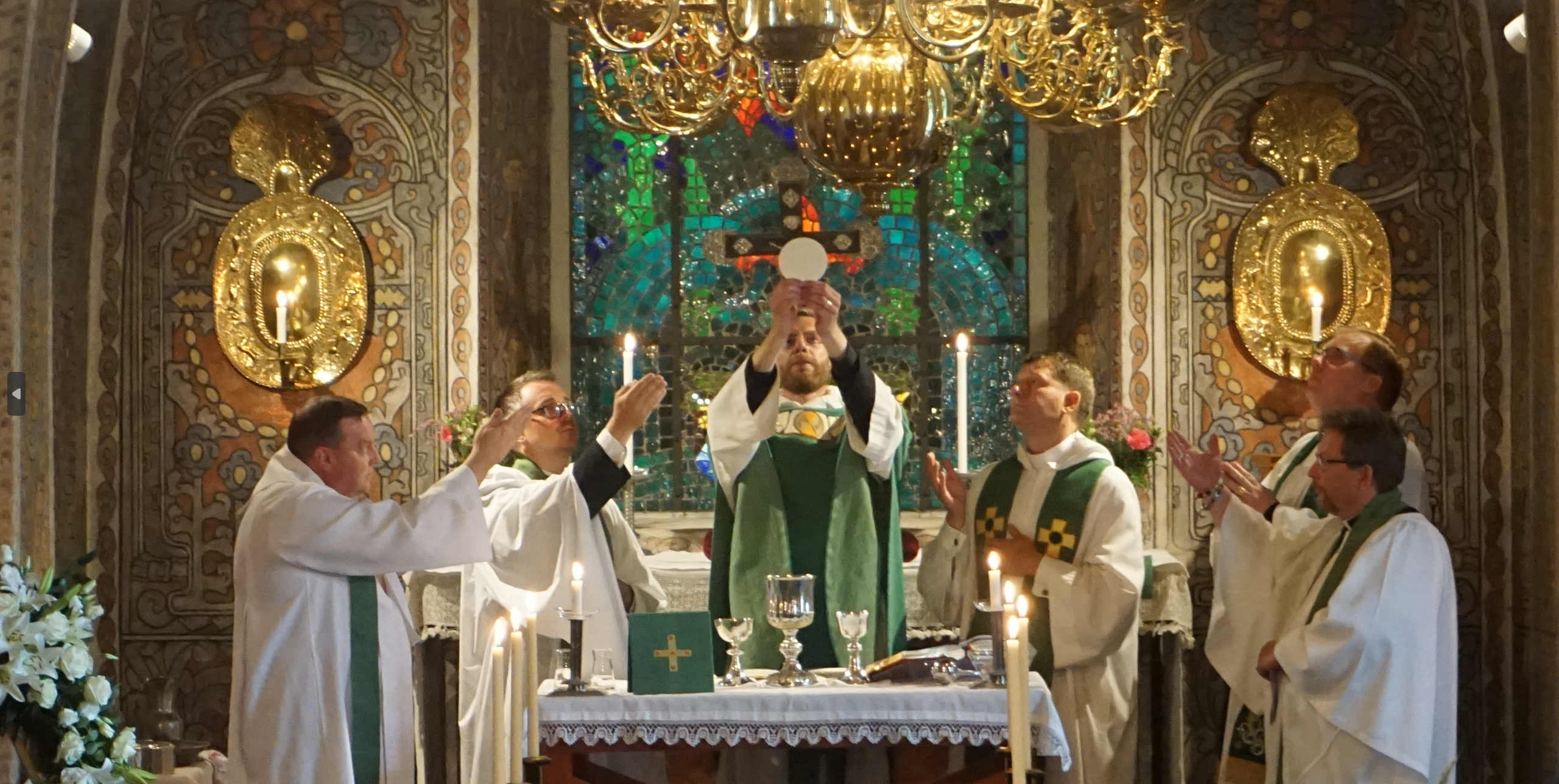
Evangelical-Lutheran priest elevating the host during the Mass at Alsike Church, Sweden

Martin Luther himself defended the practice of the elevation as heralding the real presence of Christ in the Holy Eucharist:

And this is what is meant when the priest elevates the host, by which he addresses us rather than God. It is as if he were saying to us, 'Behold, this is the seal and sign of the testament in which Christ has bequeathed to us the remission of all sins and eternal life.' In agreement with this is also that which is sung by the choir, 'Blessed be he who comes to us in the name of God', whereby we testify how we receive blessings from God, and do not sacrifice or give to God.

In the Evangelical-Lutheran Churches, the elevation and adoration of the actual Eucharistic elements occurs at various points in the offering of the Mass; in the Church of Sweden the elevation is done by the priest during the recitation of the Words of Institution, in the doxology of the Eucharistic Prayer (at the words Through Him and with Him and in Him all honor and glory is Yours, O God the Father Almighty, in the unity of the Holy Spirit, forever and ever. Amen!), and at the Agnus Dei (when stating Ecce Agnus Dei, ecce qui tollit peccata mundi. Beati qui ad cenam Agni vocati sunt; Behold the Lamb of God. Behold him who takes away the sins of the world. Blessed are those called to the supper of the Lamb). During the pronunciation of the Words of Institution (at which time the elevation of the Host and the elevation of the Chalice occurs), acolytes ring the sanctus bells thrice. This elevation gives opportunity to adore the real presence of Christ by either bowing deeply at the waist or genuflecting. During the elevation, the Daily Divine Service Book states: It is appropriate for the congregation to make the sign of the cross at the elevation/genuflection and to quietly hail the present Christ with Saint Thomas' Confession: "My Lord and my God."

== In Christian art ==
In art

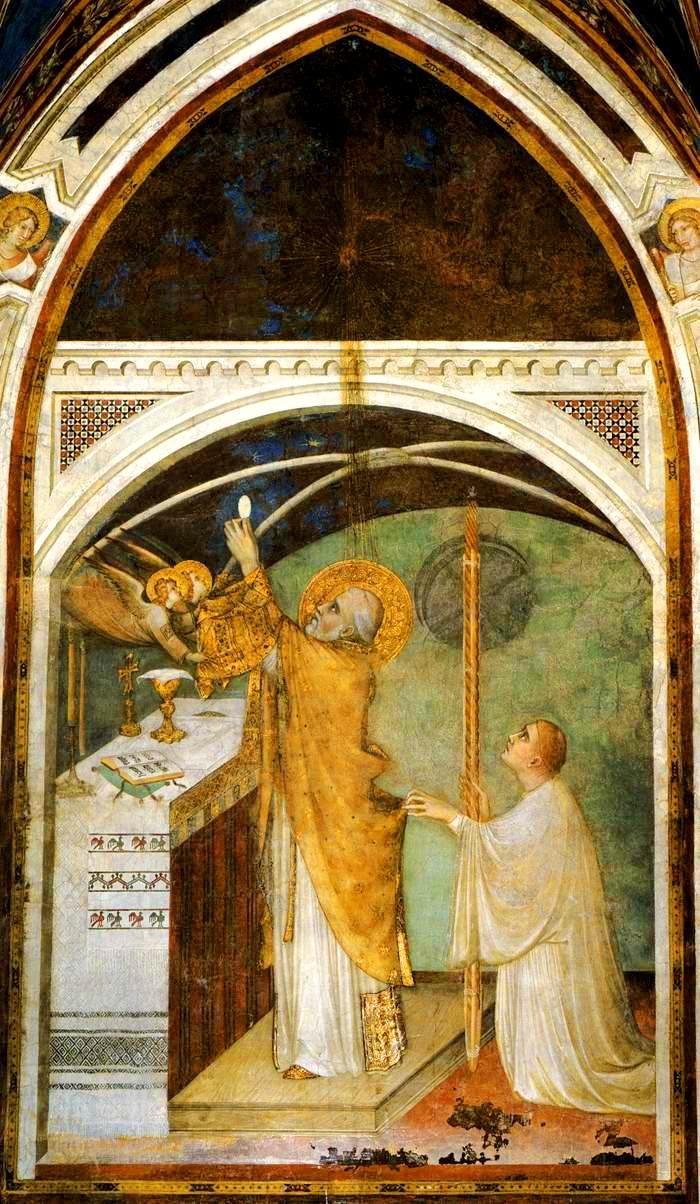
Elevation of the Host by Simone Martini in Assisi, c. 1325, with elevation candle

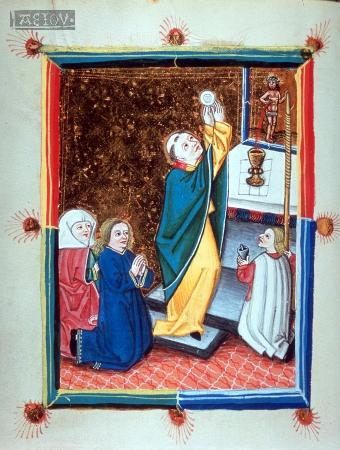
Viennese miniature of about 1470

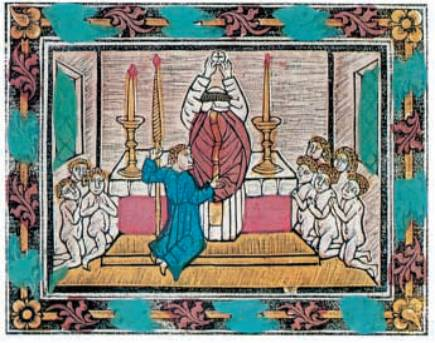
Miniature of about 1479

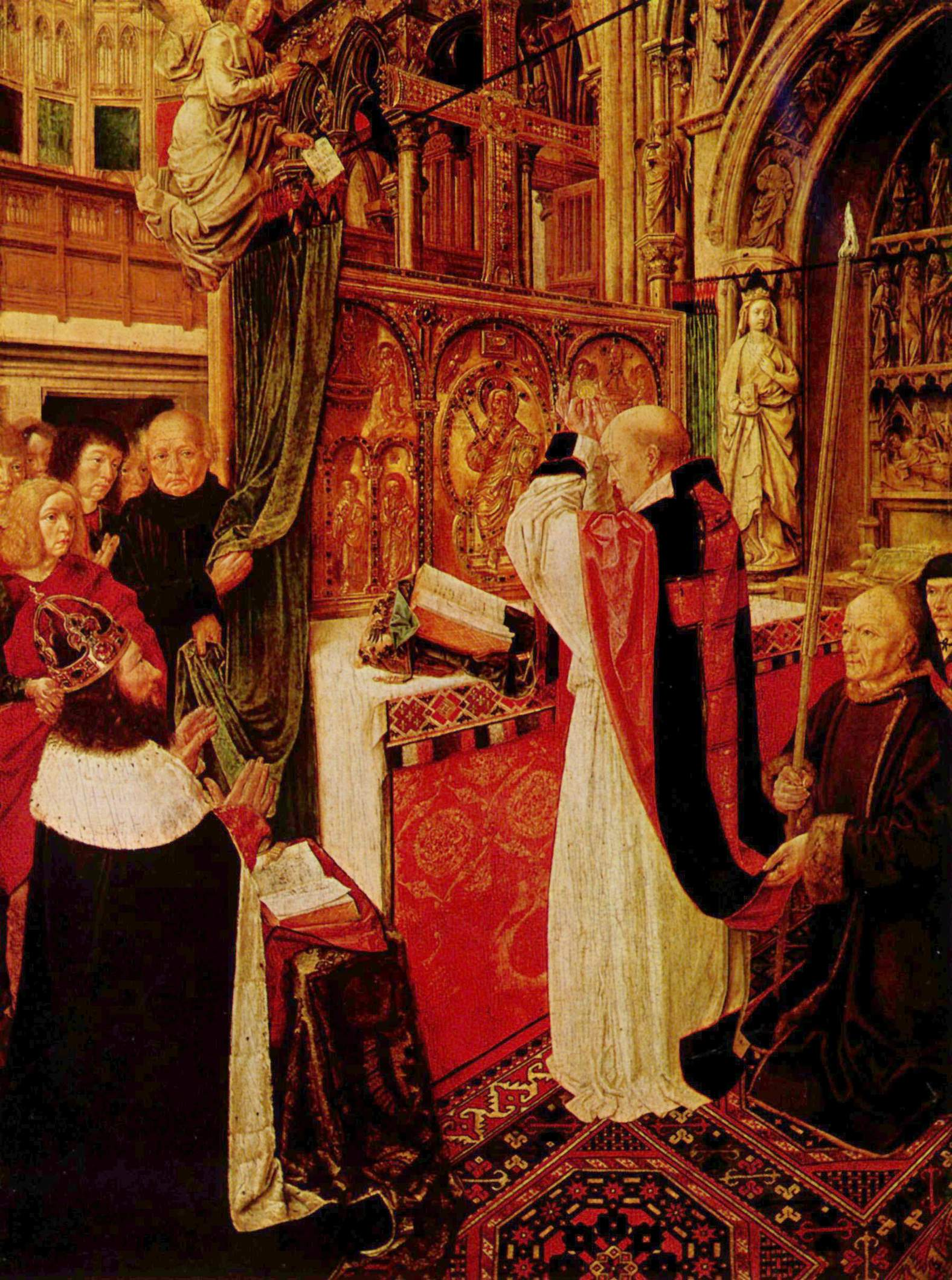
Elevation candle in a painting of about 1500 in the National Gallery, London

=== Music ===
Marc-Antoine Charpentier: composed forty-seven Élévations (between 1670 and 1700), catalogue numbers H.233 to H.280.

== Gallery ==
Selected pictures

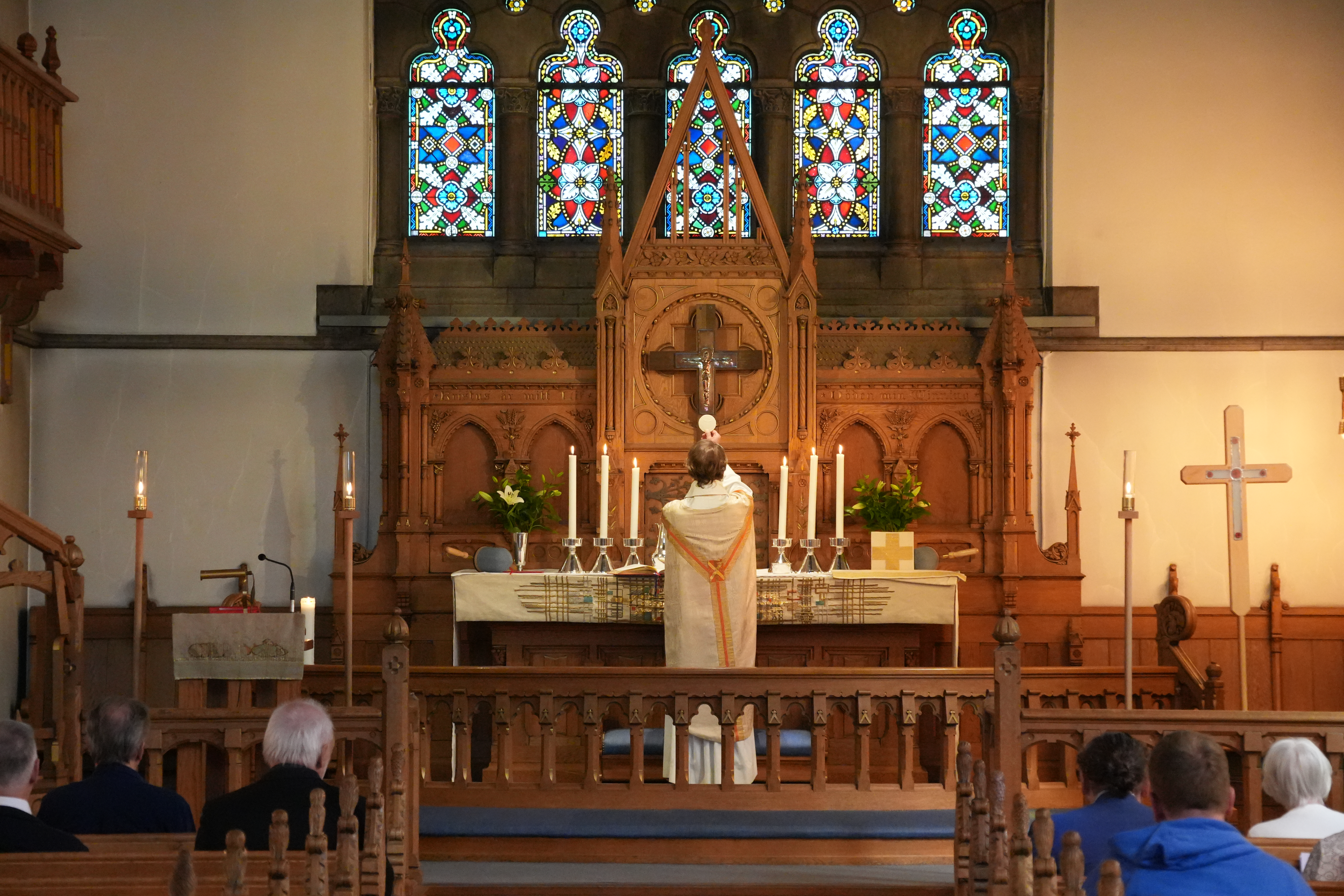
An Evangelical-Lutheran priest elevating the host during the Holy Mass offered at Gustaf Adolf Church in Stockholm

The elevation during a Requiem Mass of the Church of the Holy Trinity (Evangelical-Lutheran) in Uppsala

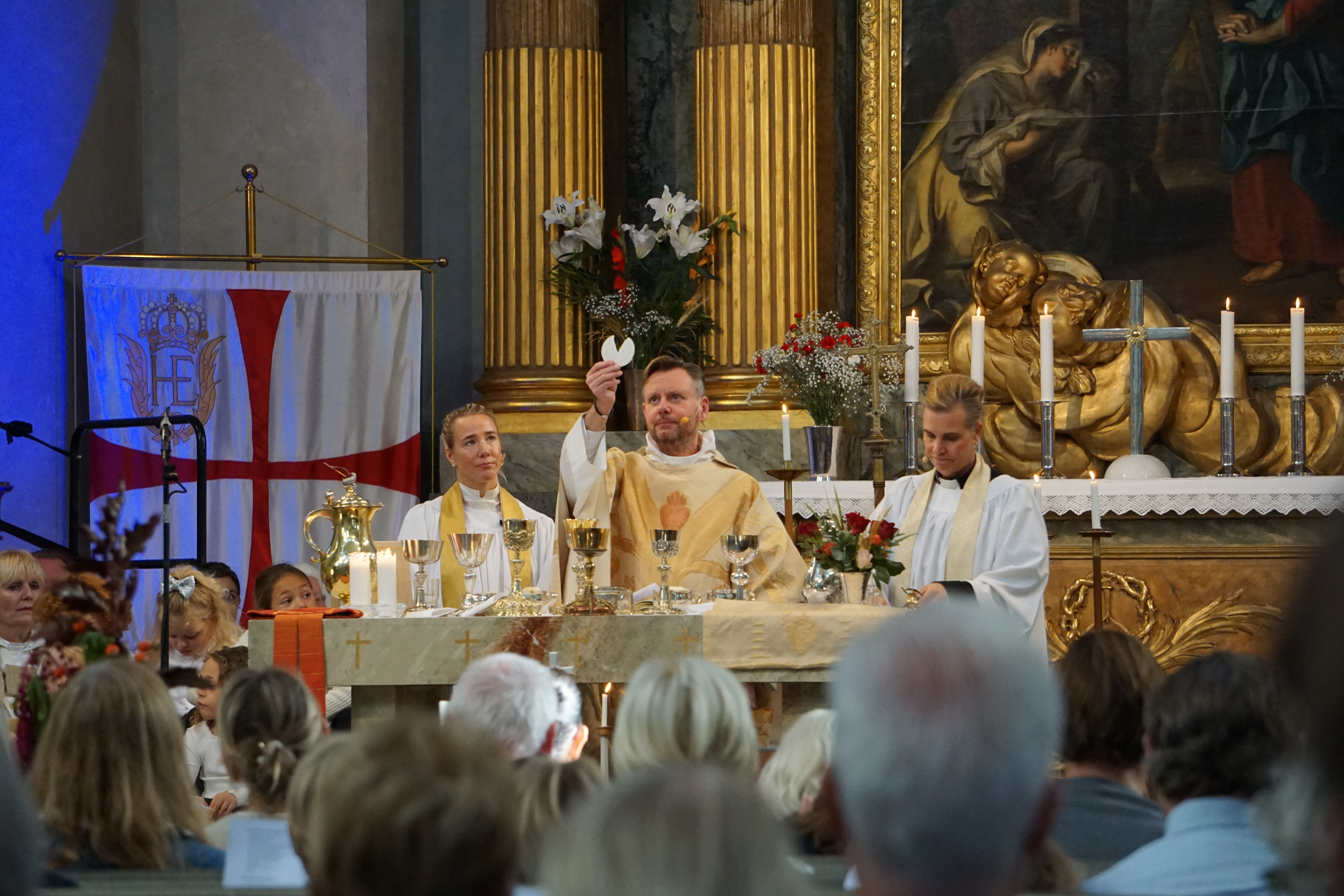
An Evangelical-Lutheran priest elevating the host during Mass at Hedvig Eleonora Church, Sweden

Elevation of the Chalice at a Lutheran Mass in the United States

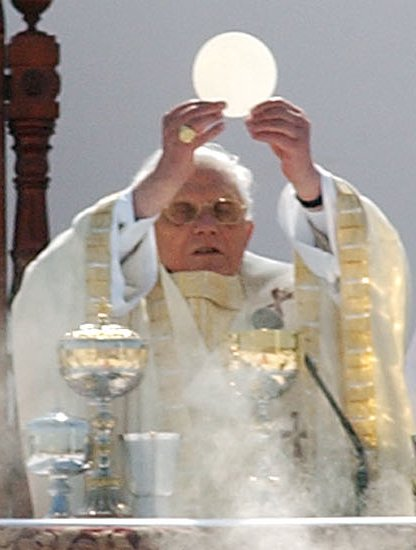
Pope Benedict XVI elevating the Host

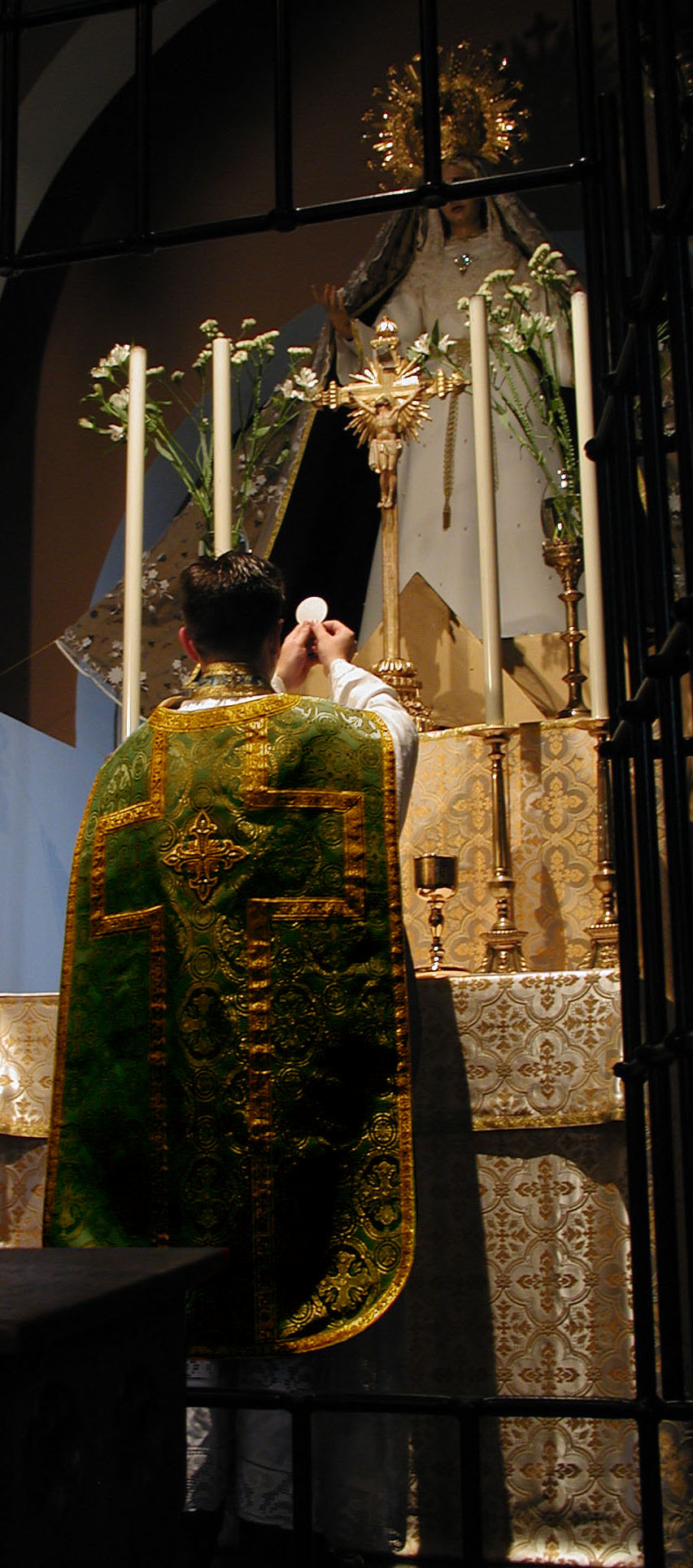
Catholic Priest elevating the Host (action incomplete)

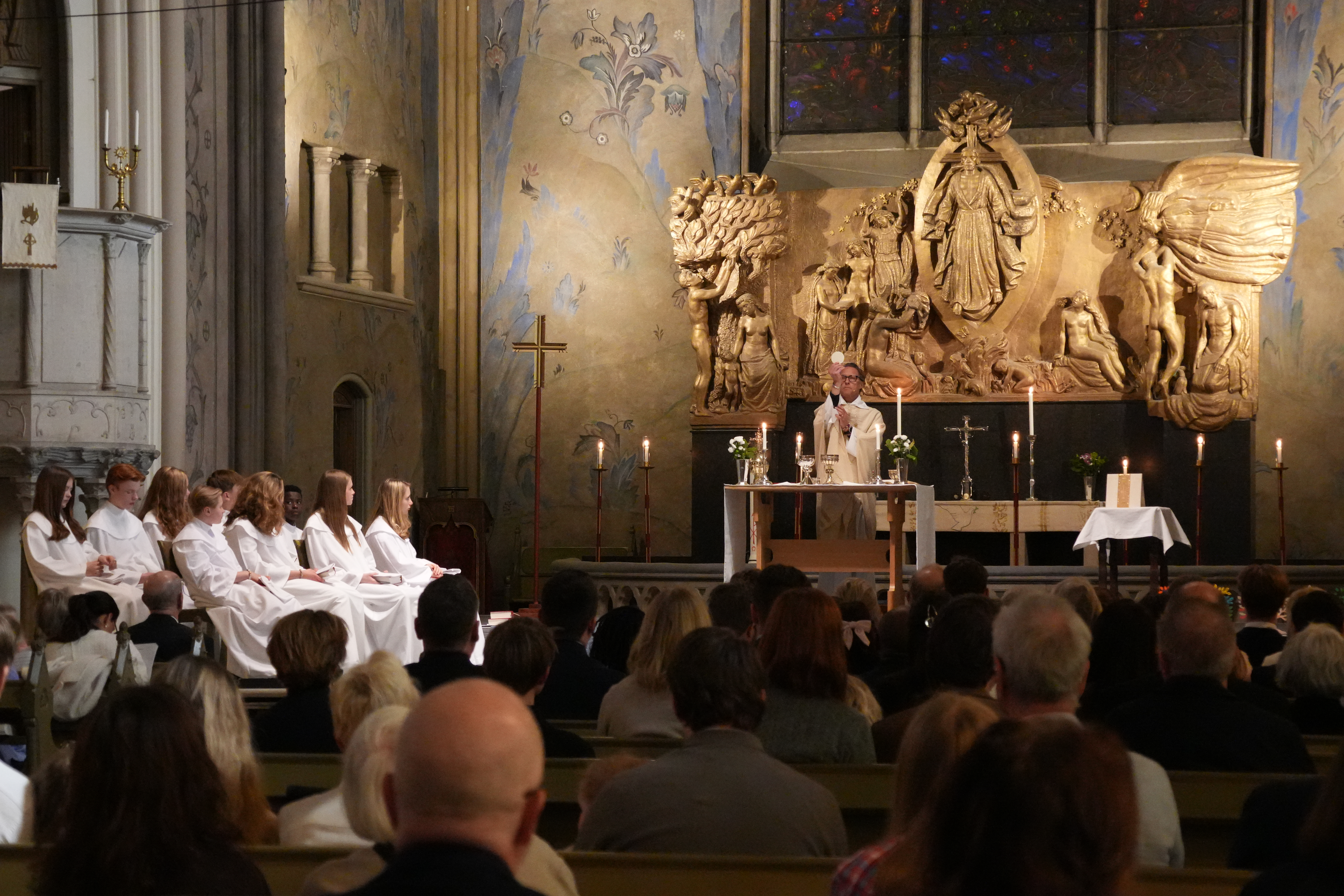
A priest of the Church of Sweden elevates the host during a Confirmation Mass at Oscar's Evangelical-Lutheran Church on the Third Sunday of Eastertide

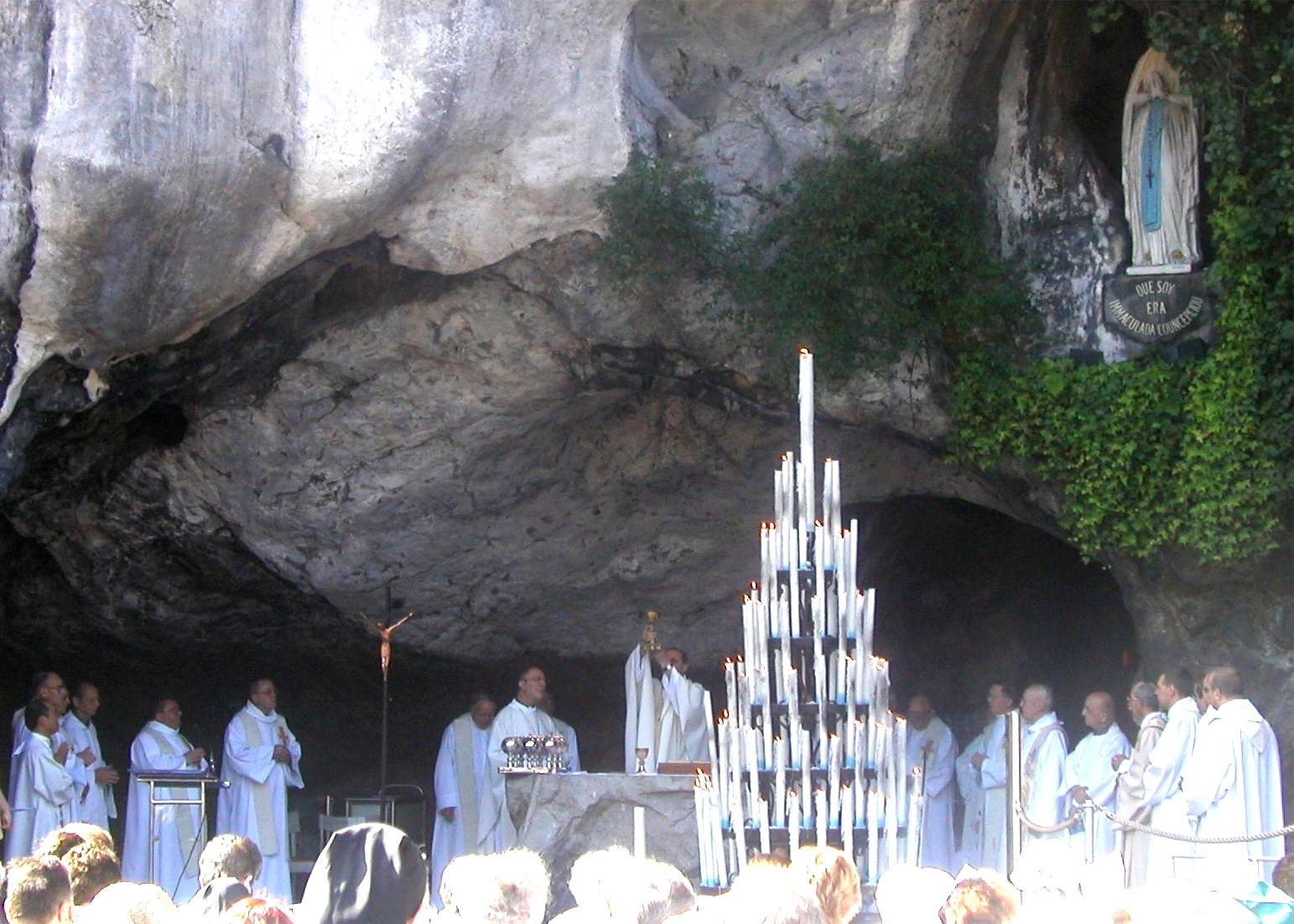
Elevation of the Chalice at a Catholic Mass in Lourdes

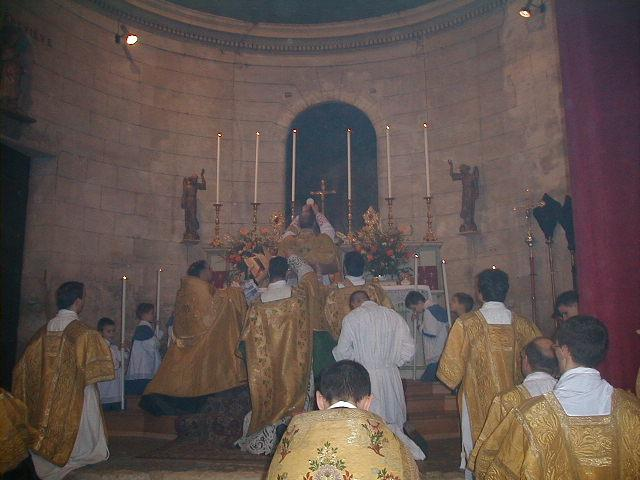
Elevation of the Host in the Catholic Rite of Versailles

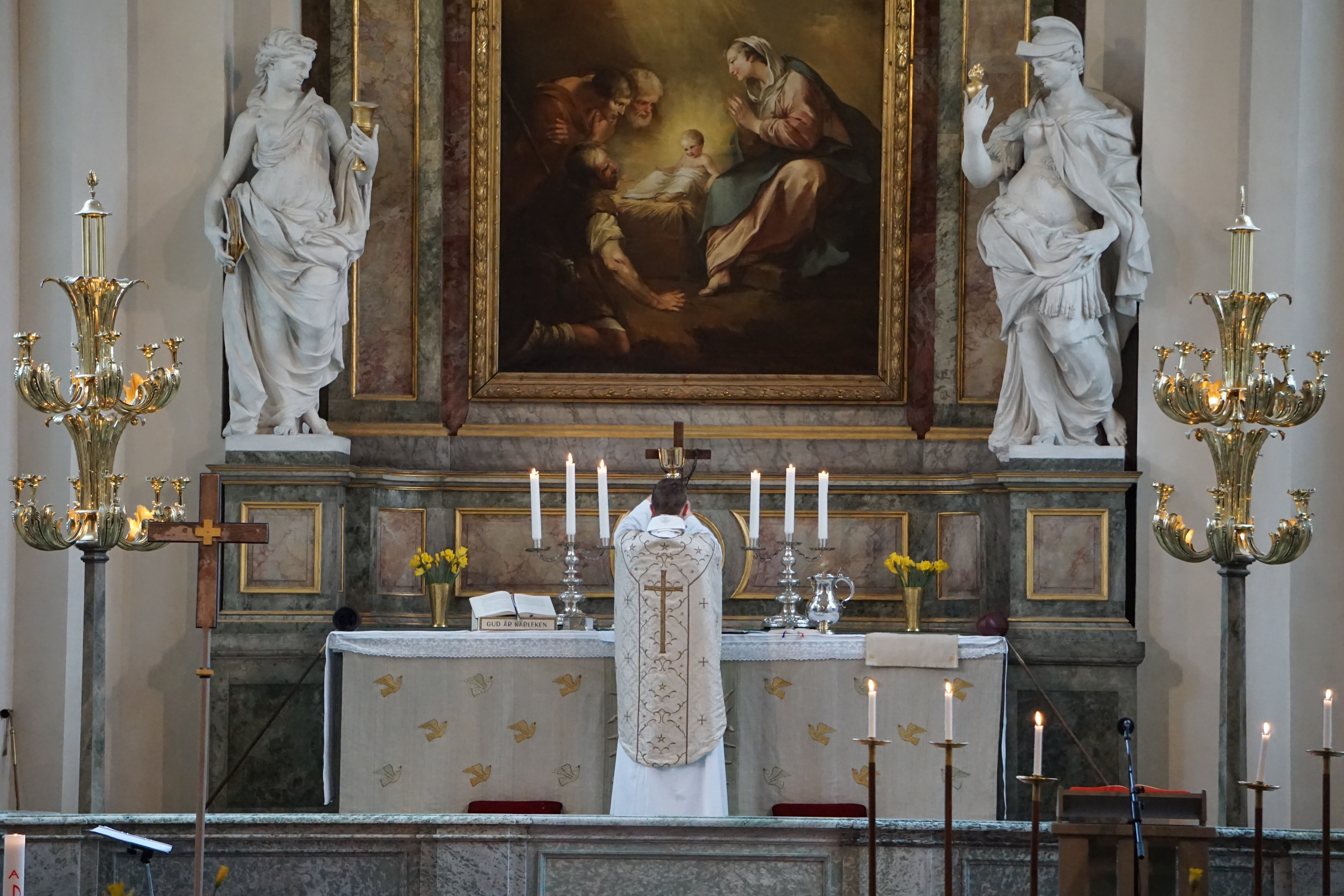
Lutheran priest elevating the chalice during the Mass at Maria Magdalena Church, Sweden

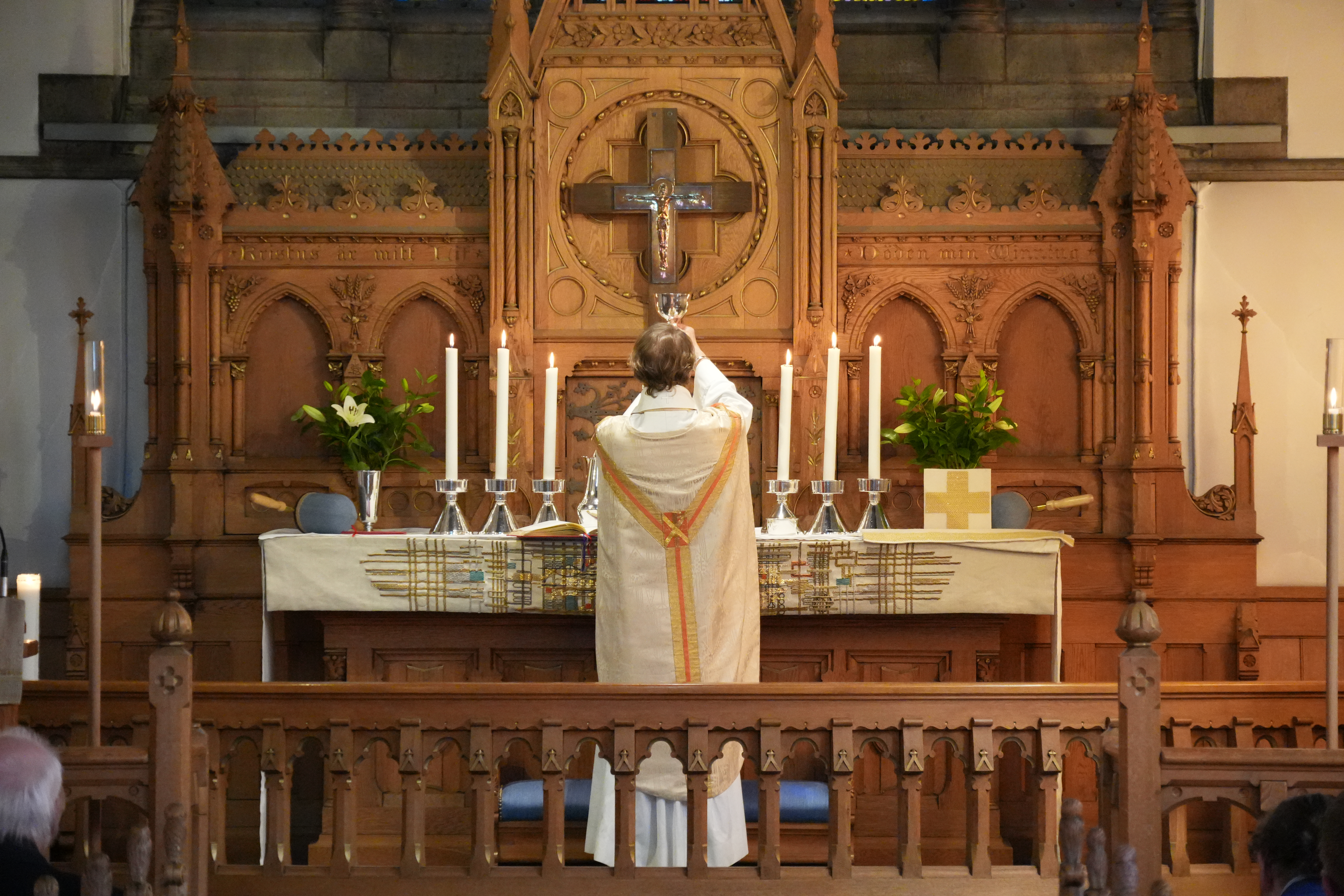
An Evangelical-Lutheran priest elevating the chalice during the Holy Mass offered at Gustaf Adolf Church in Stockholm

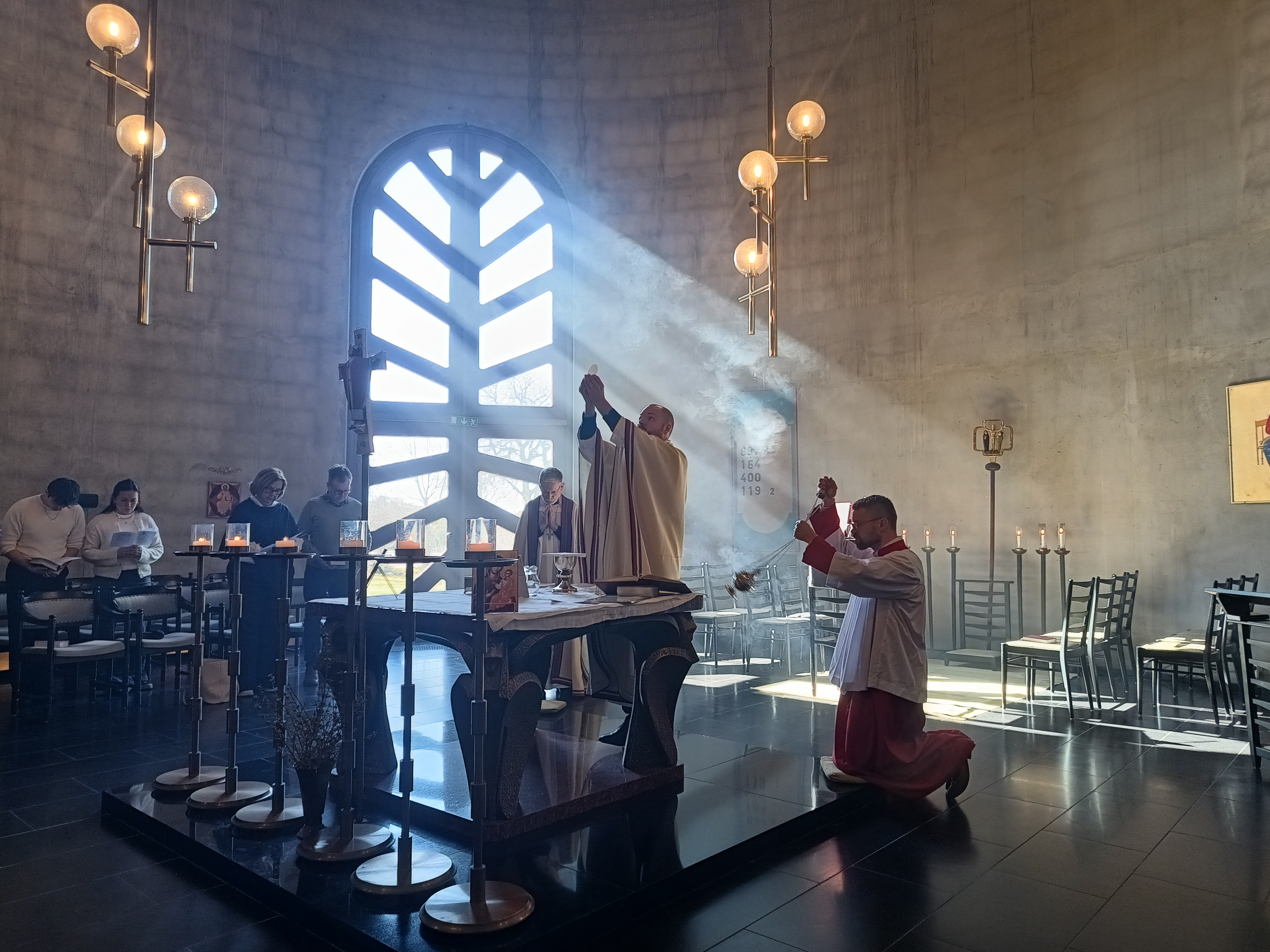
Elevation during the offering of the Holy Mass, celebrated by the Society of Saint Stephen (Evangelical-Lutheran) in the Chapel of Heavenly Joy in Kristianstad

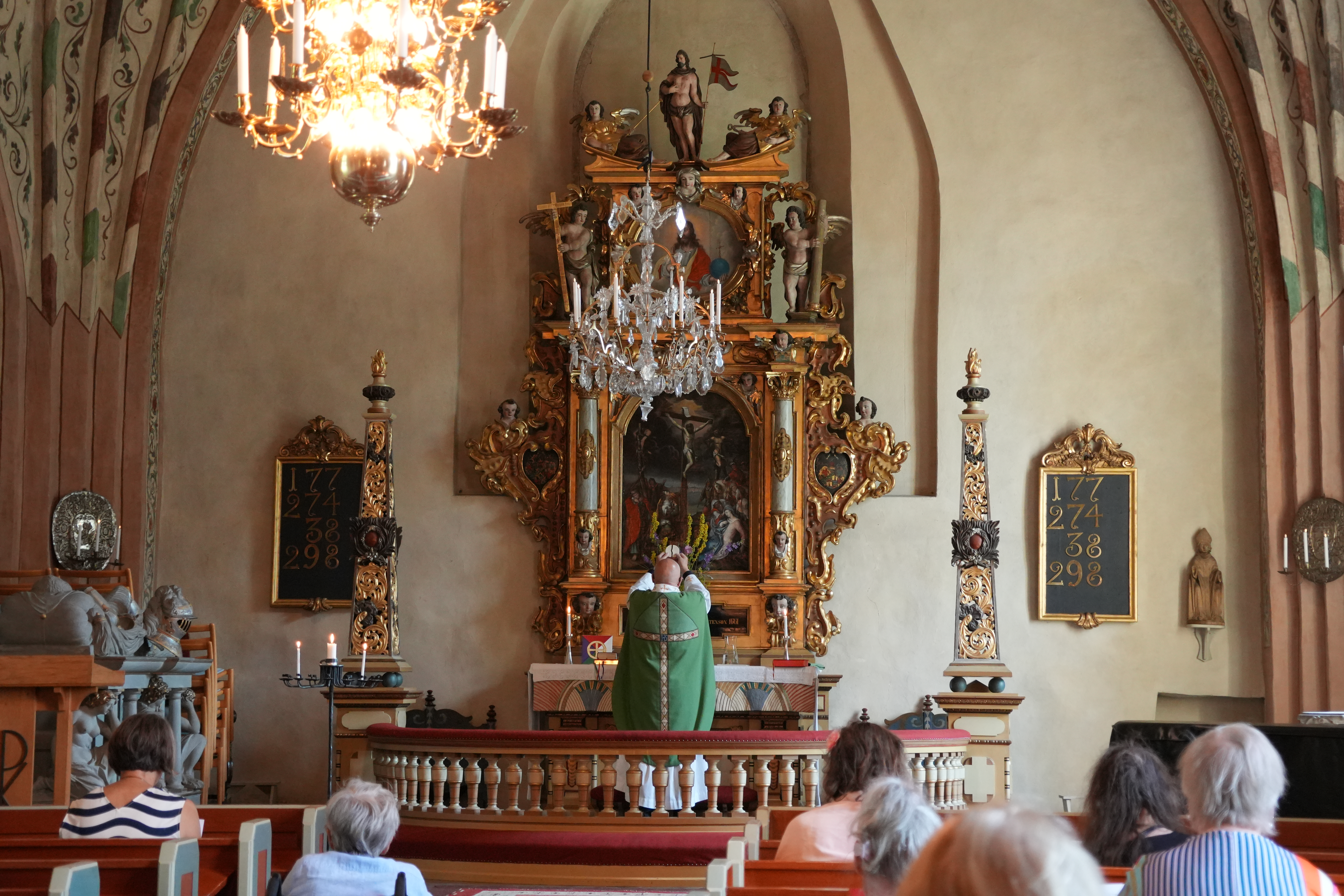
Elevation during the offering of the Holy Mass at Länna Church (Evangelical-Lutheran) in Norrtälje, Sweden

Elevation during a Thanksgiving Mass at Hedvig Eleonora Church (Evangelical-Lutheran) in Stockholm, Sweden

The elevation of the chalice during the offering of High Mass at the Church of St Stephen in Vanadislunden
