= List of ambassadors of Sweden to Benin =

Ambassador of Sweden to Benin
- Lesser coat of arms of the Kingdom of Sweden
- Incumbent; Katrin Månsson since 2025
- Ministry for Foreign Affairs
- Style: His or Her Excellency (formal); Mr. or Madam Ambassador (informal)
- Reports to: Minister for Foreign Affairs
- Seat: Stockholm, Sweden (Note: The Swedish ambassador to Benin is resident in Stockholm, Sweden.)
- Appointer: Government of Sweden
- Term length: No fixed term
- Formation: November 1961
- First holder: Love Kellberg

The Ambassador of Sweden to Benin (known formally as the Ambassador of the Kingdom of Sweden to the Republic of Benin) is the official representative of the government of Sweden to the president of Benin and government of Benin. Since Sweden does not have an embassy in Cotonou, Sweden's ambassador to Benin is based in Stockholm, Sweden.

== History ==
On the occasion of the Republic of Dahomey's declaration of independence on 1 August 1960, Sweden's Minister for Foreign Affairs, Östen Undén, stated in a congratulatory telegram to Dahomey's head of government, Hubert Maga, that the Swedish government recognized Dahomey as a sovereign and independent state and expressed the hope for friendly and cordial relations between the two countries. At the same time, King Gustaf VI Adolf also sent a congratulatory telegram.

In November 1961, Sweden's ambassador in Lagos, Nigeria, Love Kellberg, was appointed to also serve as ambassador to Porto Novo, where Sweden had not previously had diplomatic representation. In January 1962, Kellberg presented his letters of credence to President Hubert Maga, along with a gift from the King.

Sweden's ambassador to Dahomey/Benin has over the years been accredited from the neighboring countries Nigeria and Ivory Coast. Since 2015, the position has been held by a Stockholm-based ambassador-at-large, who is also ambassador to a number of other countries in West Africa.

== List of representatives ==
Name	Period	Title	Resident / Concurrent accreditation	Notes	Presented credentials	Ref
Republic of Dahomey (1958–1975)
Love Kellberg	1961–1963	Ambassador	Resident in Lagos		January 1962	
Karl Henrik Andersson	1964–1967	Ambassador	Resident in Abidjan			
Carl Swartz	1968–1969	Ambassador	Resident in Lagos			
Bertil Arvidson	1970–1972	Ambassador	Resident in Lagos			
Pierre Bothén	1973–1974	Ambassador	Resident in Lagos			
People's Republic of Benin (1975–1990)
Karl-Anders Wollter	1975 (Note: One source states 1975 and another 1976.)–1977	Ambassador	Resident in Lagos			
Vidar Hellners	1977–1981	Ambassador	Resident in Lagos			
–	1982–1982	Ambassador		Vacant		
Bengt Borglund	1983–1987	Ambassador	Resident in Abidjan			
Arne Ekfeldt	1987–1990	Ambassador	Resident in Abidjan			
Republic of Benin (1990–present)
Arne Ekfeldt	1990–1992	Ambassador	Resident in Abidjan			
Peter Bruce	1992–1995	Ambassador	Resident in Abidjan			
Bo Wilén	1996–1999	Ambassador	Resident in Abidjan			
Lars Ekström	2000 (Note: Sveriges statskalender lists Ambassador Lars Ekström in Nigeria as accredited, among others, to Benin and Togo from 1997, which is most likely a misprint. Ambassador Bo Wilén in Ivory Coast was accredited to Benin and Togo from 1996 to 1999 according to the 1999 edition of Sveriges statskalender as well as in Vem är det (2000). Ekström was most likely accredited to Benin and Togo from the year 2000, as the same source states that Ekström was accredited to Niger from that year and that Bo Wilén left the post in 1999.)–2002	Ambassador	Resident in Lagos			
Birgitta Holst Alani	2002–2005	Ambassador	Resident in Abuja			
Lars-Owe Persson	2005–2008	Ambassador	Resident in Abuja			
Per Lindgärde	2008–2012	Ambassador	Resident in Abuja			
Svante Kilander	2012–2015	Ambassador	Resident in Abuja			
Per Carlson	2015–2017	Ambassador	Resident in Stockholm		3 March 2015	
Maria Leissner	5 October 2017 – 2021	Ambassador	Resident in Stockholm	Political appointee (non-career diplomat)	3 May 2018	
Mia Rimby	2021–2025	Ambassador	Resident in Stockholm		20 January 2022	
Katrin Månsson	2025–present	Ambassador	Resident in Stockholm			
