= Vidar Hellners =

Swedish diplomat (1928–2021)

- Born: Karl Vidar Hellners; 20 July 1928; Malmö, Sweden
- Died: 26 November 2021 (aged 93); Ängelholm, Sweden
- Education: Lund University
- Occupation: Diplomat
- Years active: 1950–1993
- Spouse: Bodil Hammar (m. 1955; died 2006)
- Children: 2

Karl Vidar Hellners (20 July 1928 – 26 November 2021) was a Swedish diplomat whose career combined legal expertise with senior diplomatic service. He joined the Ministry for Foreign Affairs in 1953 after completing his law degree and judicial clerkship, and early in his career served in Warsaw and London, as well as in key roles in Stockholm. During the 1960s, he also worked extensively on international legal matters, participating in the Hague Conference on Private International Law, World Bank–related legal work in Washington, D.C., and Council of Europe initiatives.

He later held senior postings in Ankara, Jeddah, and Rome (where he was also Consul General to San Marino), and played an important role in international negotiations, including as head of delegation at the 1973 Third United Nations Conference on the Law of the Sea. In 1976, he was appointed director-general for legal affairs at the Ministry for Foreign Affairs.

From 1977 to 1981, he served as ambassador in West Africa (based in Lagos), followed by an ambassadorship in Budapest from 1981 to 1985. In 1989, he became Sweden's final ambassador to East Germany, witnessing the fall of the Berlin Wall and German reunification, and overseeing the closure of the Swedish mission in Berlin. In the early 1990s, he continued in important transitional roles, including assignments in Geneva and as Sweden's first ambassador to Riga after Baltic independence, before later serving as an adviser to a regional chamber of commerce.

== Early life ==
Hellners was born on 20 July 1928 in Malmö, Sweden, the son of director Einar Hellners and his wife, the concert singer Astrid (née Nygren). He had two younger brothers; the senior judge of appeal Trygve Hellners (1931–2021) and Ulf Hellners (1936–2025).

He received a Candidate of Law degree from Lund University in 1949.

== Career ==
Hellners completed his judicial clerkship from 1950 to 1953 and joined the Ministry for Foreign Affairs as an attaché in 1953. He served in Warsaw from 1955 to 1956, becoming embassy secretary there in 1957, before being posted to London, where he served from 1957 to 1960. He was second secretary at the Ministry for Foreign Affairs from 1960 to 1961 and first secretary from 1961 to 1963. Between 30 November 1961 and 26 November 1964, Hellners worked as an expert in the Family Law Committee (Familjerättskommittén). From 1963 to 1965, he served as a director (byrådirektör) at the Ministry for Foreign Affairs. In October 1964, he was a member of the Swedish delegation to the Tenth Hague Conference on Private International Law, and in November–December 1964 he served on the Legal Committee on the Settlement of Investment Disputes at the International Bank for Reconstruction and Development in Washington, D.C..

From 1965 to 1967, he served as first embassy secretary in Ankara. On 20 October 1965, he was appointed as an expert in an inquiry on international adoption law. In January 1966, he represented Sweden, together with Leif Brundin of the Ministry of Justice, in a Council of Europe expert committee tasked with drafting the European Convention providing a Uniform Law on Arbitration. He went on to serve as counselor and chargé d'affaires ad interim in Jeddah from 1967 to 1970. He was then counselor in Rome from 1970 to 1975 and concurrently Consul General in San Marino from 1971 to 1975. In 1973, he served as head of delegation at the Third United Nations Conference on the Law of the Sea. From 1975 to 1976, he was deputy director-general for legal affairs and deputy head of the Legal Department at the Ministry for Foreign Affairs, and in 1976 he was promoted to director-general for legal affairs.

From 1977 to 1981, he served as ambassador to Lagos, accredited also to Accra and Cotonou, as well as to Ouagadougou from 1977 to 1978 and Lomé from 1979 to 1981. During this period, he signed an Agreement on Economic, Industrial, Scientific and Technical Co-operation between Sweden and Nigeria. From 1981 to 1985, he served as ambassador to Budapest. On 20 September 1988, he was a senior adviser to the Swedish delegation at the Forty-third session of the United Nations General Assembly. From 1986 to 1989, he held a special assignment at the Ministry for Foreign Affairs.

In 1989, he was appointed ambassador to East Berlin, becoming Sweden's final ambassador to East Germany. In September 1989, he became the last foreign ambassador to present his credentials to Erich Honecker, Chairman of the State Council of East Germany. Shortly thereafter, Honecker was forced to step down on 18 October, the Berlin Wall fell on 9 November, and Germany was reunified on 3 October 1990. Hellners remained in Berlin until the end of 1990 to oversee the closure of the mission and manage transitional arrangements. In 1991, he held a special assignment in Geneva (EFTA) and also served as Sweden's first ambassador to Riga from 1991 to 1992. He returned to Geneva for another assignment from 1992 to 1993, and from 1993 onward he served as an adviser to the Chamber of Commerce and Industry of Southern Sweden.

== Personal life ==
Hellners married on 21 August 1955 at Ängelholm Church in Ängelholm to the journalist Bodil Hammar (1934–2006) of Helsingborg, who worked at Helsingborgs Dagblad. She was the daughter of district police superintendent (landsfiskal) Eric Hammar and his wife, also of Ängelholm. The couple had two daughters: Helene (born 1956) and Philippa (born 1962).

== Death ==
Hellners died on 26 November 2021 in Ängelholm, Sweden.

== Awards ==
- (Sweden) Knight of the Order of the Polar Star (3 December 1974)

== Bibliography ==
- Hellners, Vidar, ed. (1966). Internationella adoptionsärenden [International adoption cases]. Aktstycken / utgivna av Kungl. Utrikesdepartementet. Ny serie II; 17 (in Swedish) (2nd ed.). Stockholm: [Fritzes hovbokh.] [distributör]. ISSN 0562-8881. SELIBR 624095.

Diplomatic posts
Preceded by Karl-Anders Wollter	Ambassador of Sweden to Nigeria; 1977–1981	Succeeded by Bo Elfwendahl
Preceded by Karl-Anders Wollter	Ambassador of Sweden to Ghana; 1977–1981	Succeeded by Bo Elfwendahl
Preceded by Karl-Anders Wollter	Ambassador of Sweden to Benin; 1977–1981	Succeeded by Bengt Borglund
Preceded by Karl-Anders Wollter	Ambassador of Sweden to Upper Volta; 1977–1978	Succeeded by Cai Melin
Preceded by None	Ambassador of Sweden to Togo; 1979–1981	Succeeded by Bengt Borglund
Preceded by Torsten Hylander	Ambassador of Sweden to Hungary; 1981–1985	Succeeded by Ragnar Dromberg
Preceded by Henrik Liljegren	Ambassador of Sweden to East Germany; 1989–1990	Succeeded by None
Preceded by None	Ambassador of Sweden to Latvia; 1991–1992	Succeeded by Andreas Ådahl
