= Hans Fagius =

Swedish classical organist

Hans Gustav Fagius, né Andersson (born 10 April 1951), is a Swedish classical organist and pedagogue.

== Biography ==
Fagius was born in Norrköping and studied organ with Bengt Berg before entering the Royal College of Music, Stockholm, where he studied with Alf Linder. After graduating in 1974 he studied organ privately with Maurice Duruflé in Paris. He taught organ in Gothenburg and Stockholm before being appointed professor of organ at the Royal Danish Academy of Music in 1989. He became a member of the Royal Swedish Academy of Music in 1998.

== Recordings ==
Fagius has recorded many albums, including the complete organ works of J.S. Bach and the complete organ works of Maurice Duruflé. His recording of the three major organ works of Franz Liszt won the Grand Prix du Disque of the Hungarian Liszt Society in 1981.
