= Karl-Anders Wollter =

Swedish diplomat (1927–2017)

- Born: Karl-Anders Ingvar Wollter; 7 May 1927; Lund, Sweden
- Died: 3 April 2017 (aged 89); Bandhagen, Sweden
- Occupation: Diplomat
- Spouses: Margareta Hegardt (m. 1955–1960) Ulla Ekwall (m. 1961)
- Children: 5
- Relatives: Sven Wollter (brother); Stina Wollter (niece); Karl Seldahl (nephew); Christopher Wollter (grand-nephew)

Karl-Anders Ingvar Wollter (7 May 1927 – 3 April 2017) was a Swedish diplomat.

== Early life ==
Wollter was born on 7 May 1927 in Lund, Sweden, the son of Kjell Wollter, an editor, and his wife Elsa (née Ekwall). He was brother of actor Sven Wollter. He grew up on Solhöjdsgatan in Långedrag, Gothenburg. After his mandatory military service Wollter got a US scholarship and took a Bachelor of Arts degree in the United States in 1949. He was then an employee of SKF from 1949 to 1951 before he received a Candidate of Law degree from Lund University in 1955.

== Career ==
Wollter became an attaché at the Ministry for Foreign Affairs in Stockholm in 1955 and served in Helsinki in 1956, Brussels and Antwerp in 1957, Oslo in 1959, at the Foreign Ministry in 1960, in Monrovia in 1961, at the Foreign Ministry again in 1963 and Moscow in 1966. Wollter became embassy counsellor in Moscow in 1970 and served as consul general in Leningrad in 1972 and served at the Foreign Ministry in 1972. He was deputy director at the Foreign Ministry in 1972 and deputy director-general in 1973. Wollter then became Swedish ambassador in Lagos and Accra in 1974, also accredited in Porto-Novo and Niamey from 1976. He became ambassador in Buenos Aires in 1977 and there he was involved in the case of the missing Dagmar Hagelin. Wollter became ambassador in Mexico City in 1980 and was available to the Foreign Minister in 1985. Wollter became after that ambassador in Madrid in 1986 and was finally ambassador in Athens from 1989 to 1992 prior to his retirement.

He was Sweden's negotiating leader in various bilateral trade negotiations from 1972 to 1974 as well as expert at the delegation of the 40th General Assembly of the United Nations in 1985.

== Personal life ==
Wollter was married between 1955 and 1960 to the ambassador Margareta Hegardt, the daughter of the judge Carl Hegardt and Blenda (née Koch). He married for the second time in 1961 to Ulla Ekwall (born 1939), in the Swedish church in Oslo. Together they have the children Anders (born 1965 in Gothenburg), Michael (born 1962 in Monrovia), Sven (born 1963 in Monrovia), Maria (born 1966 in Stockholm) and Kristina (born in 1979 in Buenos Aires). His grandson is actor Christopher Wollter.

== Death ==
Wollter died on 3 April 2017. He was interred on 22 February 2018 at Sundbyberg Cemetery in Sundbyberg, Stockholm County.

Diplomatic posts
Preceded by Pierre Bothén	Ambassador of Sweden to Nigeria; 1974–1977	Succeeded by Vidar Hellners
Preceded by Pierre Bothén	Ambassador of Sweden to Ghana; 1974–1977	Succeeded by Vidar Hellners
Preceded by Pierre Bothén	Ambassador of Sweden to Benin; 1975–1977	Succeeded by Vidar Hellners
Preceded by Pierre Bothén	Ambassador of Sweden to Niger; 1976–1977	Succeeded by Vidar Hellners
Preceded by Pierre Bothén	Ambassador of Sweden to Upper Volta; 1976–1977	Succeeded by Vidar Hellners
Preceded by Per Bertil Kollberg	Ambassador of Sweden to Argentina; 1977–1980	Succeeded by Lars Karlström
Preceded by Carl Swartz	Ambassador of Sweden to Mexico; 1980–1985	Succeeded by David Wirmark
Preceded by Carl-George Crafoord	Ambassador of Sweden to Spain; 1986–1989	Succeeded by Ulf Hjertonsson
Preceded by Hans Colliander	Ambassador of Sweden to Greece; 1989–1993	Succeeded by Anders Thunborg
