= List of ambassadors of Sweden to East Germany =

Ambassador of Sweden to East Germany
- Lesser coat of arms of the Kingdom of Sweden
- Ministry for Foreign Affairs; Swedish Embassy, East Berlin
- Style: His or Her Excellency (formal); Mr. or Madam Ambassador (informal)
- Reports to: Minister for Foreign Affairs
- Seat: Otto-Grotewohl-Straße 3 A, East Berlin, East Germany
- Appointer: Government of Sweden
- Term length: No fixed term
- Precursor: Envoy of Sweden to the German Reich
- Formation: 26 January 1973
- First holder: Carl Johan Rappe
- Final holder: Vidar Hellners
- Abolished: 3 October 1990
- Superseded by: Ambassador of Sweden to Germany

The Ambassador of Sweden to East Germany (known formally as the Ambassador of the Kingdom of Sweden to the German Democratic Republic) was the official representative of the government of Sweden to the chairman of the State Council and government of East Germany between 1973 and the German reunification in 1990.

== History ==
On 29 November 1972, talks began in Stockholm at the senior official level on the establishment of diplomatic relations between Sweden and East Germany. The Swedish delegation was led by Count Wilhelm Wachtmeister, head of the Political Department of the Ministry for Foreign Affairs, while the East German delegation was headed by Kurt Nier. On 1 December 1972, Foreign Minister Krister Wickman announced that Sweden would recognize East Germany on 21 December 1972, the same day that the Basic Treaty was signed, in which West Germany and East Germany recognized one another as sovereign states for the first time.

The agreement on diplomatic relations was signed in East Berlin by Wachtmeister on behalf of Sweden and by Nier for East Germany. From Stockholm, Wickman sent a telegram to East Germany's foreign minister, Otto Winzer, expressing his pleasure at the conclusion of the agreement. Under the terms of the agreement—signed two hours before the Basic Treaty (also in Berlin)—Sweden and East Germany would assist each other in establishing embassies in their respective capitals and exchange ambassadors as soon as possible thereafter. On 26 January 1973, Carl Johan Rappe was appointed Sweden's first ambassador to East Germany.

Sweden's final ambassador to East Germany was Vidar Hellners, who in October 1989 became the last foreign ambassador to present his credentials to the elderly and ailing Erich Honecker, chairman of the State Council of East Germany. On 18 October, Honecker was forced to step down from the Politburo of the Socialist Unity Party of Germany, and on 9 November the fall of the Berlin Wall took place. On 3 October 1990, West Germany and East Germany were reunified, and East Germany ceased to exist. Ambassador Hellners remained in Berlin until the end of the year in order, on behalf of the Swedish Ministry for Foreign Affairs, to organize the closure of the mission and handle the transitional arrangements.

== List of representatives ==
Name	Period	Title	Presented credentials	Ref
Carl Johan Rappe	26 January 1973 – 1976	Ambassador		
Eric Virgin	1976−1982	Ambassador		
Rune Nyström	1982–1985	Ambassador		
Henrik Liljegren	1985–1989	Ambassador		
Vidar Hellners	September 1989 – 3 October 1990 (Note: On 3 October 1990, West and East Germany were reunified, and East Germany ceased to exist.)	Ambassador	27 September 1989	
