= Margareta Hegardt =

Swedish diplomat

- Born: Blenda Margareta Hegardt; 13 January 1932; Gothenburg, Sweden
- Died: 22 June 2005 (aged 73); Stockholm, Sweden
- Education: Lund University
- Occupation: Diplomat
- Years active: 1959–1997
- Spouse(s): Karl-Anders Wollter (m. 1955; div. 1960) Lars Dahlgren (m. 1962; div. 1977)
- Children: 4

Blenda Margareta Hegardt (13 January 1932 – 22 June 2005) was a Swedish diplomat. She was Swedish consul general in Los Angeles from 1983 to 1989, ambassador in Dublin from 1989 to 1993 and consul general in Hamburg from 1993 to 1997.

== Early life ==
Hegardt was born on 13 January 1932 in Gothenburg, Sweden, the daughter of the judge Carl Hegardt and his wife Blenda (née Koch). She received a Candidate of Law degree from Lund University in 1958.

== Career ==
Hegardt carried out her clerkship from 1959 to 1961. Hegardt was the secretary of the Swedish Employers Association in 1961, and director assistant there in 1966. She was director of the Education Policy Secretariat in 1971, deputy director in 1976 and became social attaché at the Swedish delegation in Brussels and at the Swedish embassies in Brussels, The Hague and Paris in 1975. Hegardt was labour counsellor there in 1977, State Secretary at the Ministry of Commerce and Industry from 1978 to 1979 and from 1981 to 1982 and was deputy state secretary for foreign affairs at the Ministry for Foreign Affairs from 1980 to 1981. Hegardt was then consul general in Los Angeles from 1983 to 1989 and ambassador in Dublin from 1989 to 1993. She was then consul general in Hamburg from 1993 to 1997.

She was a member of the board of the Labor Markets Women's Board (Arbetsmarknadens kvinnonämnd) from 1967 and in the Council for Civil Servants Training in the Industry (Rådet för tjänstemannautbildning inom industrin) from 1969. Hegardt was a member and expert in several government commissions and agencies in the field of labour market, foreign trade, social policy, education policy and the same in joint bodies and the labor market partners. She was the Swedish representative in various OECD bodies, the Industrial Development Board and in Nordic collaboration and more.

In 1989, she was awarded an honorary Doctor of Laws from California Lutheran University (CLU) for her contributions as a foreign servant in Europe and the United States. Hegardt, who served as CLU’s first Diplomat in Residence informally for two months during the spring 1998 semester, returned to California Lutheran University for the spring 1999 semester, teaching a course titled “Europe in Transition: Economic, Political and Cultural Dimensions of European Integration” and conducted a series of campus colloquia and lead discussions as a guest lecturer in graduate and undergraduate classes. Hegardt founded the Swedish Women's Forum, a multi-professional network for the exchange of experiences and support for women high in the career.

== Personal life ==
In 1955-60 Hegardt was married to the ambassador Karl-Anders Wollter (born 1927), the son of the editor Kjell Wollter and his wife Elsa (née Ekwall). She was married 1962-77 to the county prosecutor Lars Dahlgren (born 1931), the son of the chief physician Lars Dahlgren and Aina, née Svenselius.

== Death ==
Hegardt died in 2005 and was buried in Östra kyrkogården in Gothenburg.

Civic offices
Preceded by Carl-George Crafoord	Deputy State Secretary for Foreign Affairs; 1980–1981	Succeeded by Ulf Dinkelspiel
Diplomatic posts
Preceded by Olle Tunberg	Consul general of Sweden in Los Angeles; 1983–1989	Succeeded by Peter Hammarström
Preceded by Ilmar Bekeris	Ambassador of Sweden to Ireland; 1989–1993	Succeeded by Per Jödahl
Preceded by Arne Lundquist	Consul general of Sweden in Hamburg; 1993–1997	Succeeded by Leif Sjöström
