= Arwidsson =

Arwidsson is a Swedish surname. Notable people with the surname include:

- Adolf Ivar Arwidsson (1791–1858), Finnish political journalist, writer, and historian
- Greta Arwidsson (1906–1998), Swedish archaeologist

== See also ==
- Arvidsson
