= List of ambassadors of Sweden to Burkina Faso =

Ambassador of Sweden to Burkina Faso
- Lesser coat of arms of the Kingdom of Sweden
- Incumbent; Helen Holm since 7 July 2024
- Ministry for Foreign Affairs; Swedish Embassy, Ouagadougou
- Style: His or Her Excellency (formal); Mr. or Madam Ambassador (informal)
- Reports to: Minister for Foreign Affairs
- Seat: Ouagadougou, Burkina Faso
- Appointer: Government of Sweden
- Term length: No fixed term
- Inaugural holder: Karl Henrik Andersson
- Formation: 1964
- Website: Swedish Embassy, Ouagadougou

The Ambassador of Sweden to Burkina Faso (known formally as the Ambassador of the Kingdom of Sweden to Burkina Faso) is the official representative of the government of Sweden to the head of state of Burkina Faso and government of Burkina Faso.

== History ==
Until 1960 the French Upper Volta was a French possession as a part of French West Africa. In 1958 Upper Volta became an autonomous republic in the French Community, and achieved independence as the Republic of Upper Volta on 5 August 1960. Sweden's acting foreign minister, Ragnar Edenman, and King Gustaf VI Adolf sent congratulatory telegrams to President Maurice Yameogo. Sweden recognized the new nation and expressed hopes for friendly bilateral relations. On 4 August 1984 the country changed its name from Upper Volta to Burkina Faso.

Sweden's first ambassador accredited in Ouagadougou was Karl Henrik Andersson, who held a dual accreditation from the Swedish embassy in Abidjan, Ivory Coast, starting in 1964. During the 1960s and 1970s, the Swedish ambassador was accredited from the Swedish embassy in Lagos, Nigeria, and during the 1980s until the mid-2000s, the ambassador was accredited from the Swedish embassy in Abidjan. The ambassador has also been stationed in Stockholm for a few periods, from 1979 to 1982 and 2006–2010.

Sweden opened an embassy in Ouagadougou in 2010. The Swedish ambassador in Bamako held a dual accreditation to Ouagadougou and the embassy in Ouagadougou was headed by a chargé d'affaires. In 2021, Sweden's first resident ambassador in Ouagadougou was appointed.

== List of representatives ==
Name	Period	Resident / Non-resident	Title	Resident / Concurrent accreditation	Notes	Presented credentials	Ref
Republic of Upper Volta (1958–1984)
Karl Henrik Andersson	1964–1967	Non-resident	Ambassador	Resident in Abidjan			
Carl Swartz	1967–1969	Non-resident	Ambassador	Resident in Lagos			
Bertil Arvidson	1969–1972	Non-resident	Ambassador	Resident in Lagos			
Pierre Bothén	1973–1974	Non-resident	Ambassador	Resident in Lagos			
Karl-Anders Wollter	1975–1976	Non-resident	Acting Ambassador	Resident in Lagos			
Vidar Hellners	1977–1978	Non-resident	Ambassador	Resident in Lagos			
Cai Melin	1979–1982	Non-resident	Ambassador	Resident in Stockholm			
Bengt Borglund	1983–1984	Non-resident	Ambassador	Resident in Abidjan			
Burkina Faso (1984–present)
Bengt Borglund	1984–1987	Non-resident	Ambassador	Resident in Abidjan			
Arne Ekfeldt	1987–1992	Non-resident	Ambassador	Resident in Abidjan			
Peter Bruce	1992–1995	Non-resident	Ambassador	Resident in Abidjan			
Bo Wilén	1996–1999	Non-resident	Ambassador	Resident in Abidjan			
Göran Ankarberg	1999–2002	Non-resident	Ambassador	Resident in Abidjan			
Inga Björk-Klevby	2003–2005	Non-resident	Ambassador	Resident in Abidjan			
Carin Wall	2006–2010	Non-resident	Ambassador	Resident in Stockholm		22 March 2007	
Carin Wall	2010–2013	Non-resident	Ambassador	Resident in Bamako			
Owe Andersson	September 2010 – 2012	Resident	Chargé d'affaires ad interim				
Eva Emnéus	2013–2018	Non-resident	Ambassador	Resident in Bamako			
Ulrika Lindberg-Labasauskas	2012–2013	Resident	Chargé d'affaires ad interim				
Margareta Kristianson	September 2013 – October 2015	Resident	Chargé d'affaires ad interim				
Mats Hårsmar	2015–2018	Resident	Chargé d'affaires ad interim				
Jessica Svärdström	2018–2019	Non-resident	Ambassador	Resident in Bamako			
Mia Rimby	31 August 2018 – May 2021	Resident	Chargé d'affaires ad interim				
Diana Janse	2019–2021	Non-resident	Ambassador	Resident in Bamako			
Susanne Alldén	June 2021 – October 2021	Resident	Chargé d'affaires ad interim				
Maria Sargren	1 November 2021 – 2024	Resident	Ambassador				
Helen Holm	7 July 2024 – present	Resident	Chargé d'affaires ad interim				

== See also ==
- Burkina Faso–Sweden relations
