= Gustaf Adolf Church =

Coordinates: 59.3375°N 18.0983°E

- Gustaf Adolfskyrkan
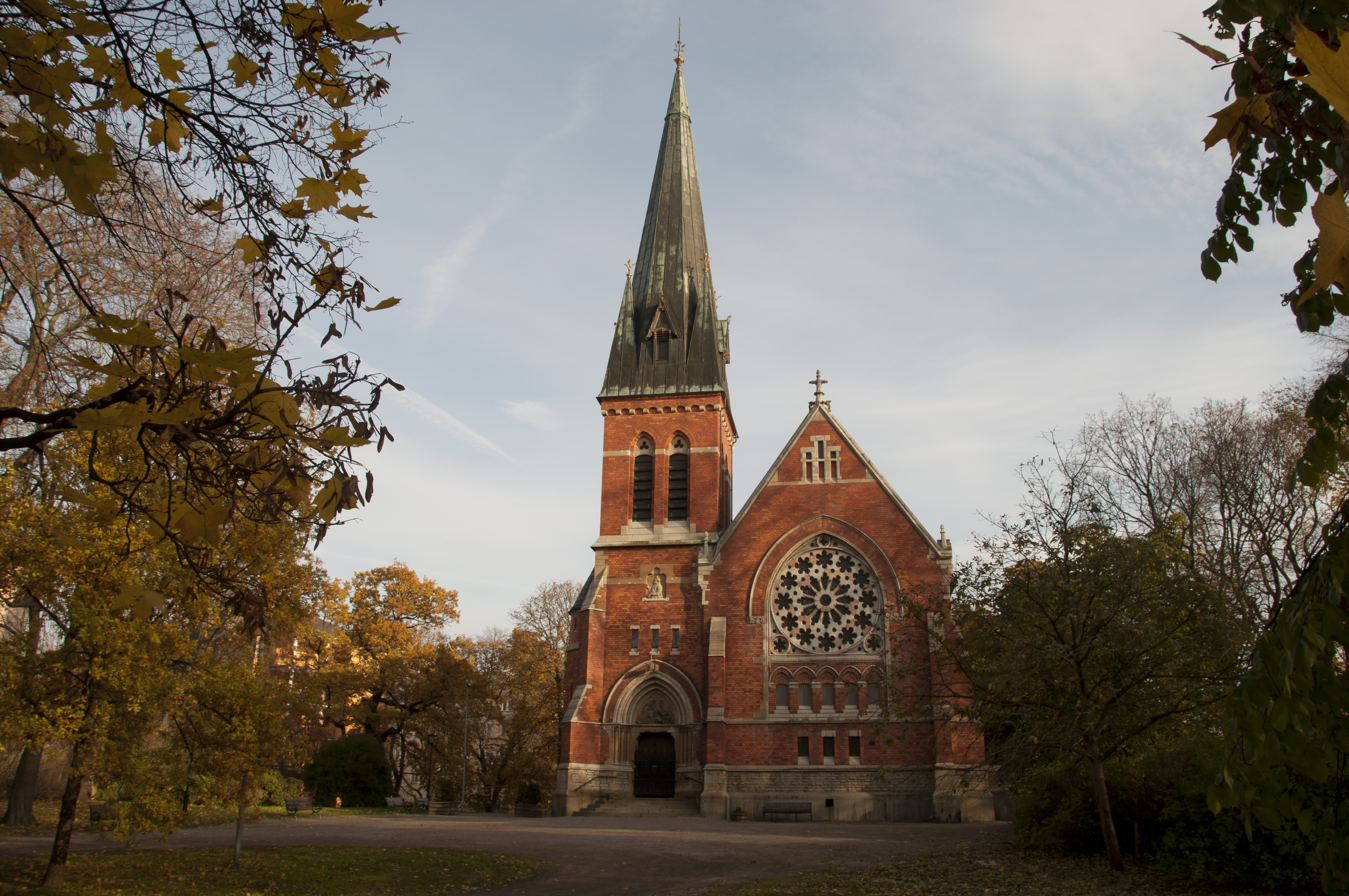
- The Gustaf Adolf Church in October 2010
- Gustaf Adolf Church
- Location: Östermalm
- Country: Sweden
- Denomination: Church of Sweden

History
- Consecrated: 16 November 1892

Administration
- Diocese: Stockholm
- Parish: Oscar

The Gustaf Adolf Church (Swedish: Gustaf Adolfskyrkan) is a church building in the Gustav Adolf Park at Östermalm in Stockholm, Sweden. Belonging to the Oscar Parish of the Church of Sweden, the church was inaugurated on 6 November 1892 by bishop Gottfrid Billing.
