= Bertil Arvidson =

Swedish diplomat (1921–2004)

- Arvidson c. 1960s
- Born: Lars Bertil Theodor Arvidson; 7 May 1921; Stockholm, Sweden
- Died: 1 February 2004 (aged 82); Stockholm, Sweden
- Resting place: Norra begravningsplatsen
- Education: Stockholm University College
- Occupation: Diplomat
- Years active: 1939–1982
- Spouse(s): Mai Kaups (m. 1947; died 1961) Barbro Berg (m. 1963)
- Children: 1
- Relatives: Theodor Arvidson (father); Karl Kaups (father-in-law)

Lars Bertil Theodor Arvidson (7 May 1921 – 1 February 2004) was a Swedish diplomat who held several senior positions in the Ministry for Foreign Affairs and served at diplomatic missions across Europe, South America and Oceania. His postings included Paris, Rio de Janeiro, Canberra and Oslo, where he served as counsellor from 1963 to 1969. In 1969, he was appointed ambassador to Lagos, with concurrent accreditation to several West African countries.

From 1972 to 1978, he served in the Ministry's negotiating group, participating in trade negotiations with countries including China and the Soviet Union. He also played an important role in Sweden's participation in the Conference on Security and Co-operation in Europe (CSCE), serving as Sweden's chief negotiator at the 1977 Belgrade follow-up meeting. He subsequently served as ambassador to Belgrade (1978–1982) and as Sweden's Permanent Representative to the Council of Europe in Strasbourg (1982–1987). After retiring, he continued to undertake assignments related to the CSCE process in the Baltic states and Central Asia.

== Early life and education ==
Arvidson was born on 7 May 1921 in Stockholm, Sweden, the son of Bishop Theodor Arvidson (1883–1964) and his wife, Ida (née Kilander). He received a Candidate of Law degree from Stockholm University College in 1951.

== Career ==
Arvidson served as a junior official (amanuens) at the National Swedish Office for Aliens (Statens utlänningskommission) from 1945 to 1946 and at the Royal Swedish Naval Materiel Administration in 1948. He subsequently worked as an editor at the Ministry for Foreign Affairs' Press Bureau from 1948 to 1950. He was posted to Paris in 1950 and appointed an attaché at the Ministry for Foreign Affairs that same year. From 1952 to 1954, he served in Rio de Janeiro, followed by a posting to Canberra from 1954 to 1956. He was appointed secretary at the Ministry for Foreign Affairs in 1956, promoted to first secretary in 1959, and became senior administrative officer (byrådirektör) in 1963.

In April 1963, Arvidson participated as an alternate member of the Swedish delegation to the Vienna Conference on Consular Relations in Vienna, Austria. From 1963 to 1969, he served as counsellor at the Swedish Embassy in Oslo. He was then appointed ambassador to Lagos, serving from 1969 to 1972, with concurrent accreditation to Accra from 1970, as well as Niamey, Ouagadougou and Porto-Novo.

From 1972 to 1978, he served as director-general (utrikesråd) in the Ministry for Foreign Affairs' negotiating group. During this period, Arvidson participated in trade negotiations and agreements with state-trading countries, including China, the Soviet Union, Poland and Czechoslovakia. He was also a member of the Swedish delegation to the Conference on Security and Co-operation in Europe (CSCE) in Helsinki from 30 July to 1 August 1975, where the Helsinki Accords were signed. From 5 to 9 April 1976, he accompanied the Swedish delegation during Prime Minister Olof Palme's visit to the Soviet Union. The following year, he served as Sweden's chief negotiator at the CSCE follow-up meeting in Belgrade in 1977.

Arvidson subsequently remained in Belgrade, where he was appointed ambassador in 1978, with concurrent accreditation to Tirana. From 1982 to 1987, he served as Sweden's Permanent Representative to the Council of Europe in Strasbourg. Following his retirement in 1987, Arvidson continued to contribute his expertise to various government inquiries and assignments in the Baltic states and Central Asia, within the framework of the ongoing CSCE process.

== Personal life ==
On 9 August 1947, Arvidson married physician Mai Kaups (1921–1961) at St. Peter's Church in Stockholm. Kaups was a laboratory physician at the National Bacteriological Laboratory (Statens bakteriologiska laboratorium). She was born on Hiiumaa, Estonia, and was the daughter of clergyman and politician Karl Kaups and Hilda (née Eller).

On 1 November 1963, he married for a second time, to Barbro Berg (1921–2015), in Copenhagen, Denmark. She was the daughter of operations manager Emil Berg and Signe (née Eriksson).

Arvidson had a daughter, Nina. From 1980 onwards, the Arvidson family had a summer residence in Båstad. From 1991, Arvidson and his wife lived on Bondegatan in the Södermalm district of Stockholm.

== Death ==
Arvidson died on 1 February 2004 in Stockholm, Sweden. He was buried in the Arvidson family grave on 6 April 2004 at Norra begravningsplatsen in Solna, near Stockholm.

== Awards and decorations ==
- (Sweden) Commander of the Order of the Polar Star (3 December 1974)
- (Sweden) Knight of the Order of the Polar Star (1967)

== Bibliography ==
- Arvidson, Bertil (1989). "Europarådet 40 år" [The Council of Europe – 40 Years]. UD informerar (in Swedish) (3). Stockholm: Utrikesdepartementet. ISSN 0347-5298. SELIBR 823890.

Diplomatic posts
Preceded by Carl Swartz	Ambassador of Sweden to Nigeria; 1969–1972	Succeeded by Pierre Bothén
Preceded by Carl Swartz	Ambassador of Sweden to Niger; 1969–1972	Succeeded by Pierre Bothén
Preceded by Carl Swartz	Ambassador of Sweden to Upper Volta; 1969–1972	Succeeded by Pierre Bothén
Preceded by Carl Swartz	Ambassador of Sweden to Ghana; 1970–1972	Succeeded by Pierre Bothén
Preceded by Carl Swartz	Ambassador of Sweden to Dahomey; 1970–1972	Succeeded by Pierre Bothén
Preceded by Axel Lewenhaupt	Ambassador of Sweden to Yugoslavia; 1978–1982	Succeeded by Lennart Myrsten
Preceded by Axel Lewenhaupt	Ambassador of Sweden to Albania; 1978–1982	Succeeded by Lennart Myrsten
Preceded by Lennart Westerberg	Permanent Representative of Sweden to the Council of Europe; 1982–1987	Succeeded by Lennart Myrsten
