= Theodor Arvidson =

- Born: August Theodor Arvidson; 13 October 1883; Järpås, Sweden
- Died: 12 March 1964 (aged 80); Stockholm, Sweden
- Occupation: Bishop
- Spouse: Ida Elisabet Kilander (m. 1917)
- Children: Bertil Arvidson

August Theodor Arvidson (13 October 1883 – 12 March 1964) was a bishop of the Methodist Church in Sweden.

Arvidson was born in Järpås, Sweden, to Lutheran parents. He was converted to Methodism in his youth and joined the Methodist Church in Gothenburg in 1901. He joined Sveriges Arskonferens (Swedish Conference) in full connection in 1909.

Prior to his election to the episcopacy in 1946, he served as a pastor, district superintendent, book editor and manager. As bishop he served the Central Conference of Northern Europe of the Methodist Church. He also served for a time as the president of the National Free Church Council and as a member of the Ecumenical Council of Sweden and the Nordic Inst., Sigtuna.

== Selected writings ==
- Det Avgörande Beviset för Kristendomen (The Final Evidence for Christianity), 1917.
- Helgelsen - Grundval och Upplevelse (Sanctification - Foundation and Experience), 1931.
- Andens Fullhet och Andens Gåvor (The fulness of the Spirit and the Gifts of the Spirit), 2nd ed., 1935.
- Av Mitt Skall han Taga (He Will Take of Mine), 1937.
- Från Advent till Pingst (From Advent to Pentecost), 1937.
- Methodistkyrkan, Vad hon är, Vad hon lär, Vad hon vill (The Methodist Church, What She Is, What She Teaches, What She Will), 4th enl. ed., 1940.
- Translations of several English books including work of Bishop Nuelsen.

== See also ==
- List of bishops of the United Methodist Church
