= Hedvig Eleonora and Oscar Parish =

Hedvig Eleonora and Oscar Parish Hedvig Eleonora och Oscars församling
- Parish
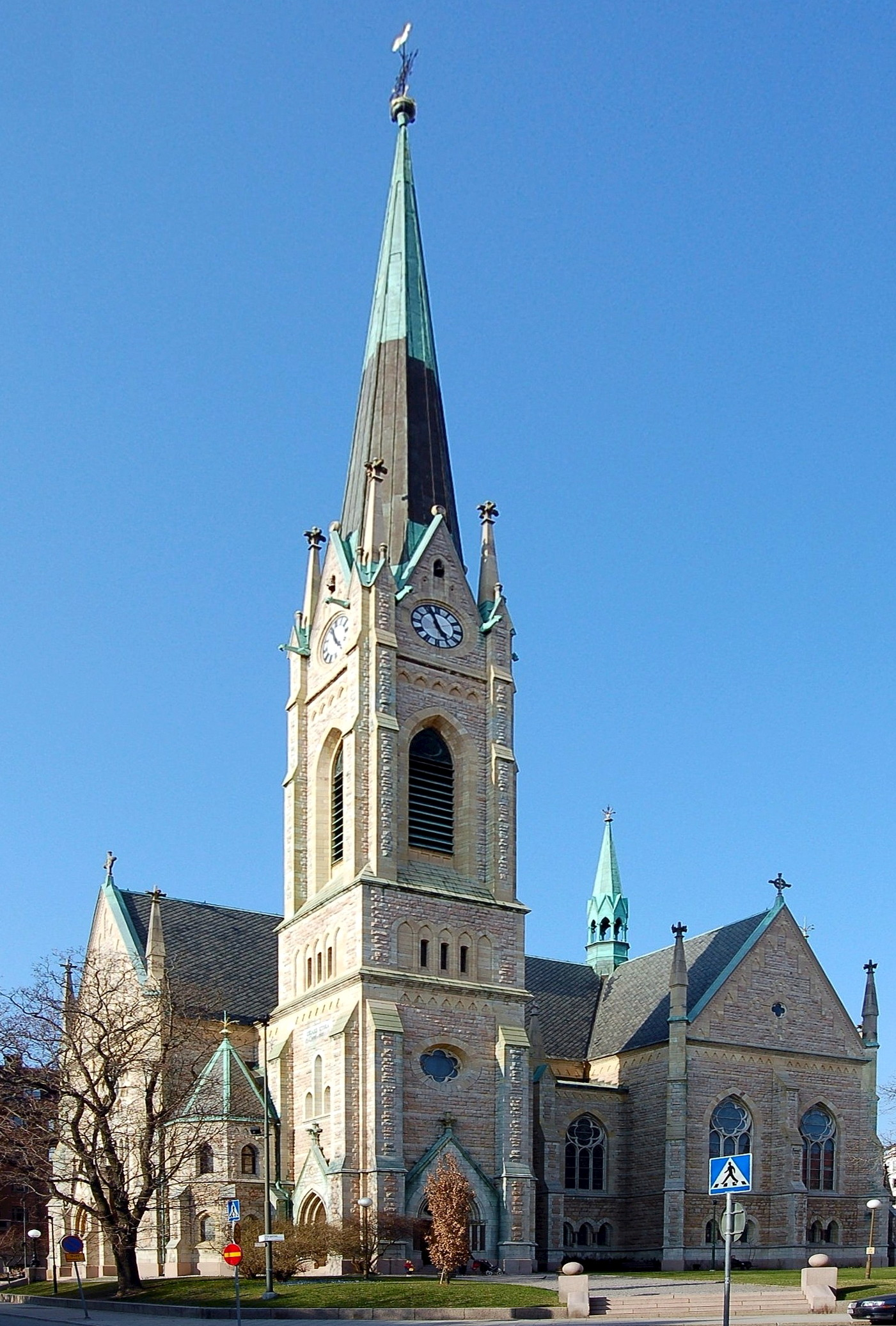
- Oscar's Church

- Location within Stockholm Location within Sweden
- Coordinates: 59°20′01″N 18°05′39″E
- Country: Sweden
- Municipality: Stockholm Municipality
- Religious congregation: Church of Sweden
- Diocese: Archdiocese of Uppsala (–1942); Diocese of Stockholm (1942–)
- Founded: 1 May 1906

Population (31 December 2018)
  - Total: 39,045
- Parish code: 018012 (1952-01-01–1966-12-31) and 018011 (1967-01-01–)
- Pastorship code: 130203
- Website: www.svenskakyrkan.se/oscarsforsamling

Hedvig Eleonora and Oscar Parish (Swedish: Hedvig Eleonora och Oscars församling) (before 2026 Oscar Parish; Swedish: Oscars församling) is a parish in Östermalm's church district (kontrakt) in the Diocese of Stockholm, Sweden. The parish is located in Stockholm Municipality in Stockholm County. The parish forms its own pastorship.

== History ==
Oscar Parish was formed on 1 May 1906 by a break from Hedvig Eleonora Parish and has since formed its own pastorship. The name was Oskar until 1962 when it was changed to Oscar. There are five churches in Oscar Parish: Oscar's Church, Gustaf Adolf Church, Djurgårdskyrkan, Olaus Petri Church and Oscars Lillkyrka. Since 2002, the Oscar Parish has had a well-developed exchange of friends with Martin Luther Kirchengemeinde in Zeuthen, Berlin, Germany.

== Location ==
Oscar Parish includes parts of Östermalm, Gärdet, Frihamnen and southern Djurgården.
