= Oscar's Church =

Lutheran church in Stockholm, Sweden

- Oscarskyrkan
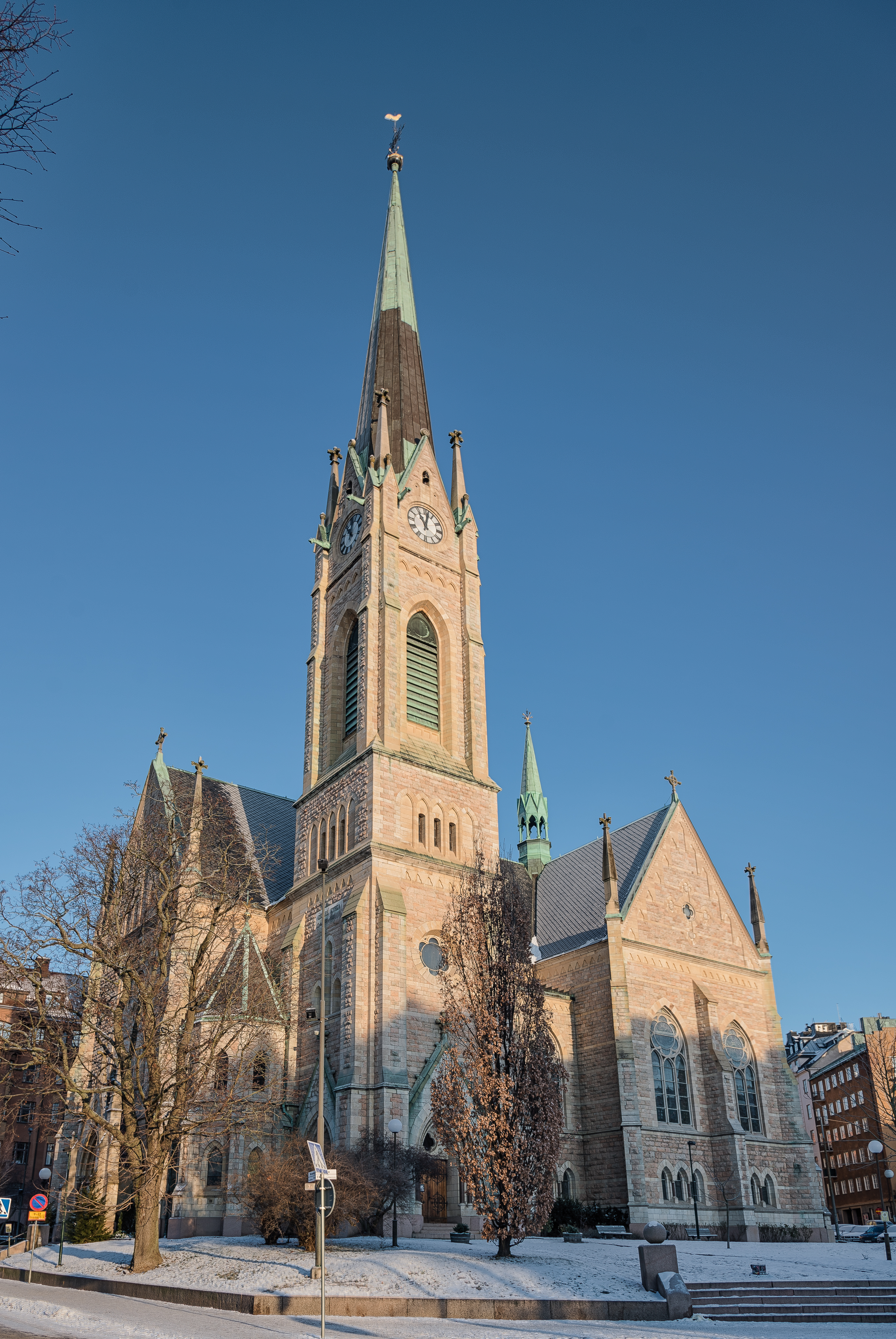
- The Oscar's Church in January 2016
- Oscar's Church
- 59°20′00″N 18°05′36″E
- Location: Östermalm, Stockholm
- Country: Sweden
- Denomination: Church of Sweden
- Website: oscarsforsamling.se

Architecture
- Architect: Gustaf Hermansson
- Style: Gothic Revival
- Years built: 1897–1903
- Completed: September 1903

Administration
- Diocese: Diocese of Stockholm
- Parish: Oscar's Parish

Oscar's Church (Swedish: Oscarskyrkan) is a Church of Sweden church in Stockholm. The three-aisled hall church, which holds 1,200 people, has an 80-metre-high (260 ft) tower in the south-western part of the building. Oscar's Church is located in the south-eastern part of Östermalm, where Storgatan and Narvavägen meet, near the Swedish History Museum. Narvavägen is together with the nearby Strandvägen—from which the church is also visible—one of the city's main boulevards, lined with several residential palaces.

== History ==
The church was inaugurated in September 1903 as the result of a design competition nine years earlier. The competition was won by Gustaf Hermansson, who also designed the Sofia Church. It was King Oscar II himself, after whom the church is named, who laid the foundation stone in 1897. Criticised from the start for its Gothic Revival style, it was originally meant to be partly clad in brick; this changed to a uniformly white façade, clad in limestone and marble. The construction work was delayed several times because of problems with the foundation, non-deliveries and labour strikes, which is why the church was not consecrated until 1903.

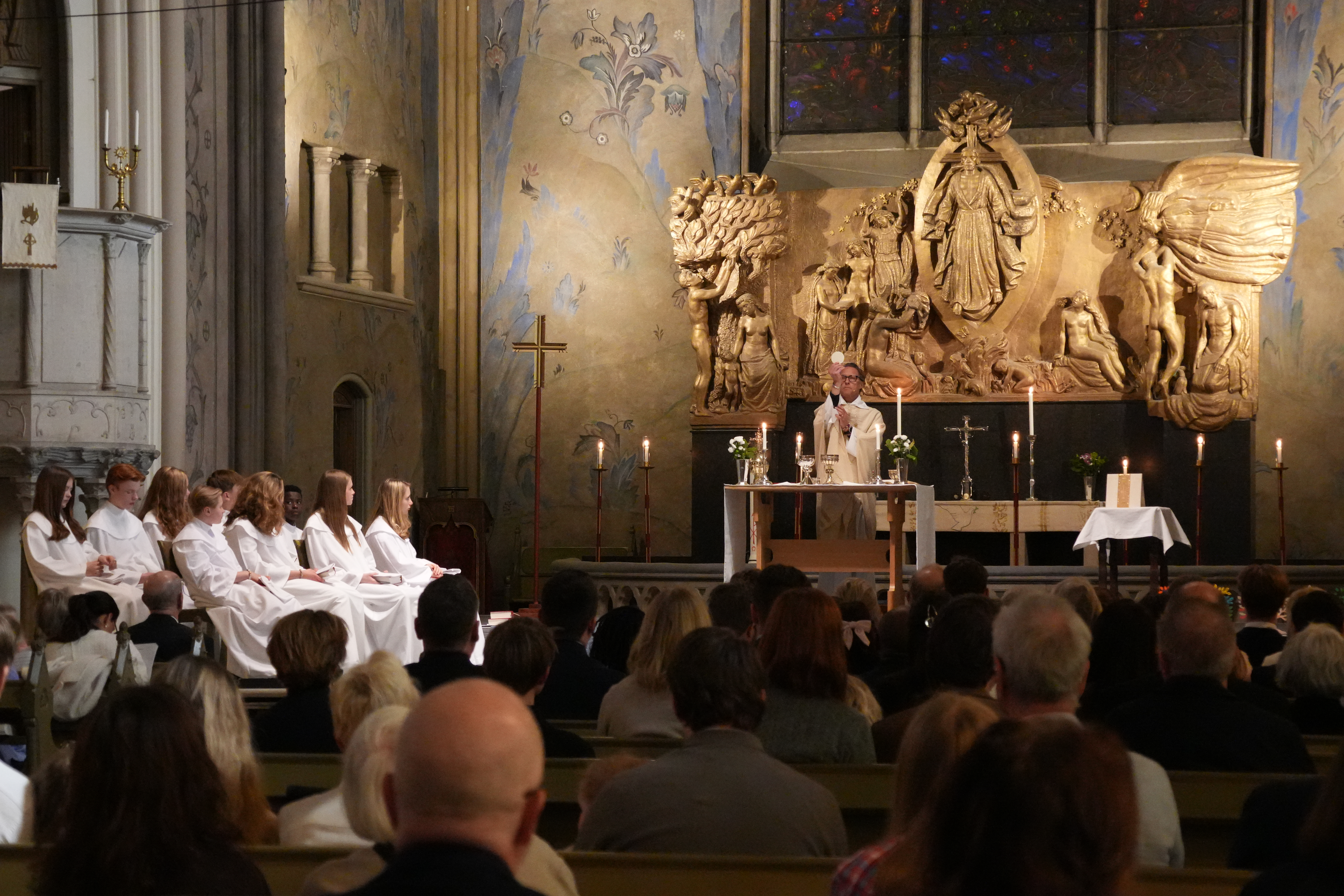
An priest elevates the host before the congregation during a Confirmation Mass at Oscar's Church.

== Interior ==
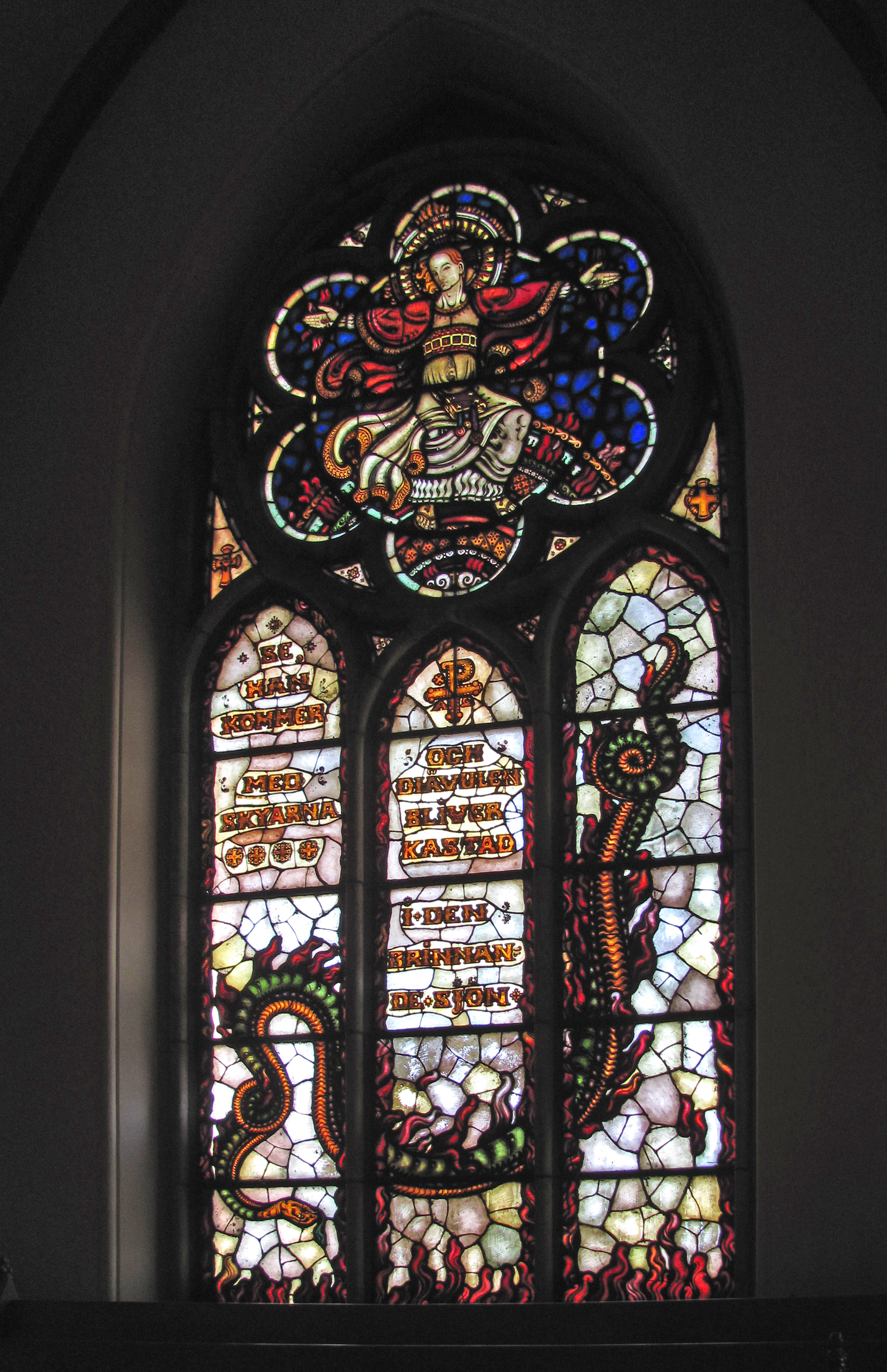
Stained glass windows

The church underwent several renovations during the 1900s. In 1921–1923 major changes were made to the interior, including new stained glass windows designed by Emanuel Vigeland, all under the direction of architect Lars Israel Wahlman, previously known for having designed the Engelbrekt Church. In 1954–1956 further alterations were made to the interior, leading to changes in the altarpiece and the removal of some ornamental ceiling decorations.

=== Organ ===
The main church organ, considered to be one of the country's most notable, has received attention abroad. It was built in 1949 by the Danish firm Marcussen & Søn, to the wishes of Alf Linder, who was the church organist from 1943 until his death in 1983. The organ has four manuals and a pedal, with a total of 78 voices and more than 5,200 pipes — making it one of the largest in Sweden.

== See also ==
- List of churches in Stockholm
- List of tallest church buildings in the world
