= Lina Arvidsson =

Swedish author (born 1981)

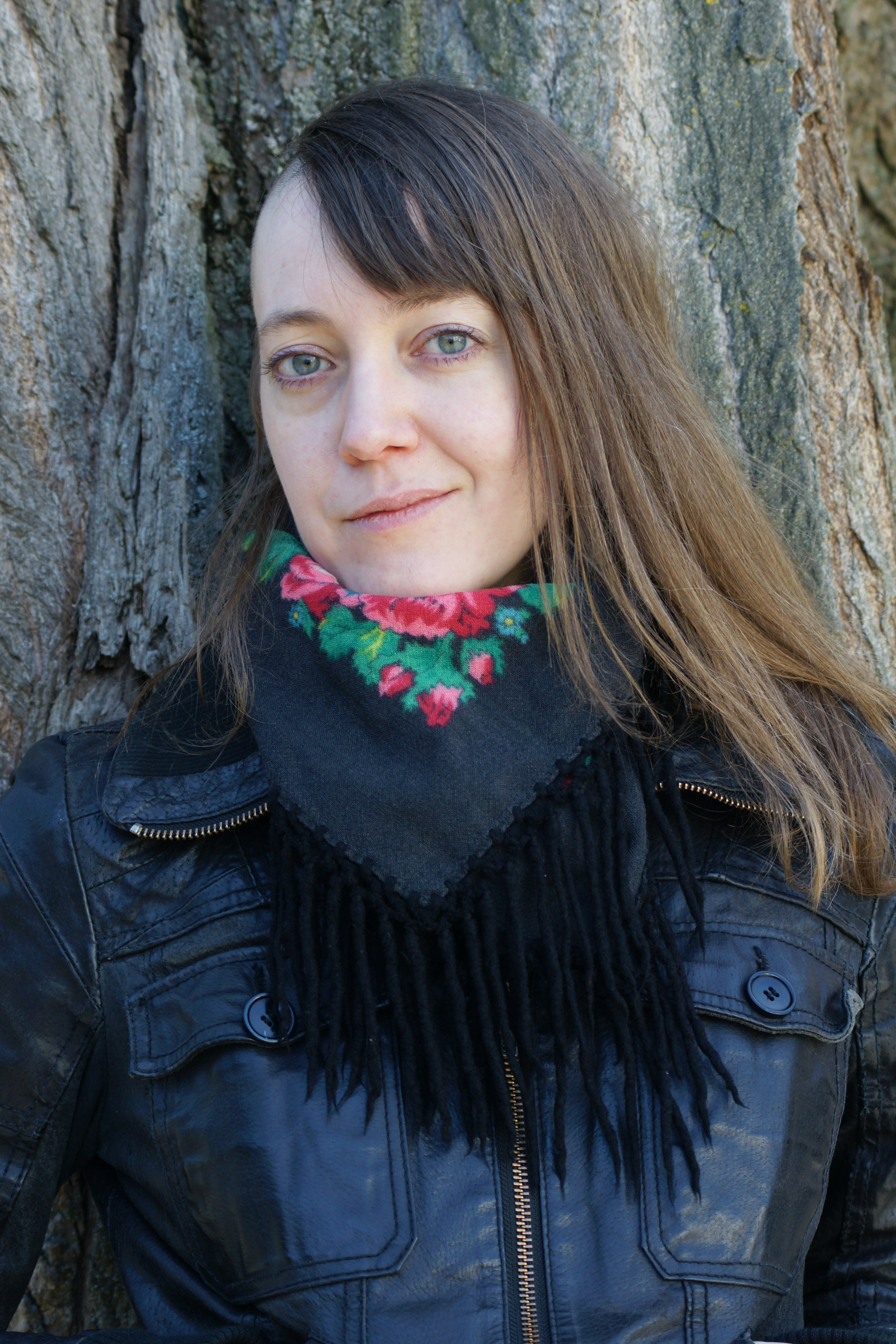
- Arvidisson in 2017
- Born: 1981 (age 44–45)
- Occupation: Author

Lina Arvidsson (born 1981) is a Swedish author, writing coach, and poet.

== Biography ==
She was born in 1981 and grew up in Västra Karup as the oldest of four siblings. Arvidsson made her debut in 2012 with the young adult's novel Det borde finnas regler (There should be rules). In 2014 she followed this up with the book Säg inte det här till någon (Do not say this to anyone) which was published under the pseudonym "Ariel Held". In 2020 this was followed by the book Aldrig ensam (Never Alone), a collection of horror-genre short stories. Aldrig ensam was positively review by the reviewer Lena Nöjd writing for dagensbok.com, who said that "Narrative pace and psychological insight go hand in hand. The alternation between everydayness and fear is imperceptible, never artificial in a sought-after way". In 2021 her book of poetry, Vänligen bygg inga berg (do not build mountains) was published, which focused on the people who serve in shops and aspects of working in stores, and which was based on her experiences when she worked as cashier for 13 years for the Swedish food retail group ICA. Donia Saleh, reviewing Vänligen bygg inga berg for the Swedish newspaper Aftonbladet, praised Arvidsson's "poetic sharpness" but also criticised her "haughty morality, which occasionally tires me out".
