= Alf Linder =

Swedish organist (1907–1983)

- Linder in 1941
- Born: 28 July 1907; Hammarö, Värmland County, Sweden
- Died: 21 December 1983 (aged 76); Stockholm, Sweden
- Education: Royal College of Music, Stockholm
- Occupations: Organist; music professor
- Years active: 1940–1983
- Employers: Stockholm Concert Hall; Oscar's Church; Royal College of Music, Stockholm
- Musical career
- Genres: Classical

Alf Linder (28 July 1907 – 21 December 1983) was a Swedish organist, renowned for his frequent radio broadcasts and his teaching at the Stockholm Conservatory.

== Life ==
Linder was born in Hammarö, near Karlstad, on 28 July 1907. He studied the organ with Claes Rendahl and Otto Nordlund (organists of Karlstad Cathedral) and is reported to have learned the complete organ works of Bach by the age of ten. In 1924, he auditioned, unsuccessfully, to study organ at the Stockholm Conservatory (Royal College of Music, Stockholm) with Gustaf Hägg. He was accepted into the conservatory the following year and became the first organ student of the newly-appointed organ professor Otto Olsson. His repertoire during his studies at the conservatory included Bach's "Pièce d'Orgue", Olsson's Prelude and Fugue in C♯ minor and Widor's "Symphonie Romane". He passed the organist's exam in 1927 and the church music exam in 1933.

In 1938–1940, Linder traveled several times to Leipzig to study organ with Günther Ramin – studies that influenced him greatly. He later described the experience in the program notes of a 1977 recording:

When I made my debut recital, in the Gustaf Vasa Church in Stockholm in 1933, I had included this work [The Bach Prelude and Fugue in D-major (BWV 532)] in my program, and I performed it in the way in which Bach was performed at the time. When I came to Günther Ramin in Leipzig, I played the D-major Fugue for him, almost as I had played it at my debut recital in Stockholm (five years earlier). After that, Ramin played the same piece his way, in a light and airy manner with only 8', 4' and 1' registers. It was a completely new experience for me, bot in terms of sound and technique.

Linder made his first recordings for Swedish Radio in January and March 1940, and he was appointed organist of the Stockholm Concert Hall the same year, a position he held until 1954. He became the organist of Oscar's Church, Stockholm, in 1943 and held that position until his death in 1983. There, he arranged 45-minute organ recitals on Saturday nights and played the complete works of Bach within this recital series, 1944–1945. He taught organ at the Stockholm Conservatory starting in 1938 and became professor in 1958. In 1954 he became a member of the Royal Swedish Academy of Music.

Linder died on 21 December 1983 in Stockholm.

== Selected recordings ==
- 1980: Organ works by Hilding Rosenberg
- 1975: Organ works by Max Reger
- 1959: The complete organ works of Dieterich Buxtehude

== Biography ==
- Åstrand, Hans. "Linder, Alf". Grove Music Online. Oxford University Press.
- Marshall, Kimberly (2002). "The Taciturn Charisma of Alf Linder". In Snyder, Kerala (ed.). The Organ as a Mirror of its Time. New York, NY: Oxford University Press. pp. 287–302. ISBN 0-19-514415-5.
