= Confirmation =

Christian religious practice

A stained glass representation of a Lutheran confirmation. An elder lays hands on the confirmand.

In Christian denominations that practice infant baptism, confirmation is seen as the sealing of the covenant created in baptism. Those being confirmed are known as confirmands. The ceremony typically involves laying on of hands.

Catholicism views confirmation as a sacrament. The sacrament is called chrismation in Eastern Christianity. In the East it takes place immediately after baptism; in the West, when a child reaches the age of reason or early adolescence, or in the case of adult baptism immediately afterwards in the same ceremony. Among those Christians who practise confirmation during their teenage years, the practice may be perceived, secondarily, as a coming of age rite.

In many Protestant denominations, such as the Lutheran, Reformed, Anglican and Methodist traditions, confirmation is a rite that often includes a profession of faith by an already baptized person. Confirmation is required by Lutherans, Anglicans and other traditional Protestant denominations for full membership in the respective church; the covenant theology of Reformed churches considers baptized infants members of the church, while confirmation or "profession of faith" is required for admittance to the Lord's Table. In Catholic theology, it is the sacrament of baptism that confers membership, while "reception of the sacrament of Confirmation is necessary for the completion of baptismal grace". The Catholic and Methodist denominations teach that in confirmation, the Holy Spirit strengthens a baptized individual for their faith journey.

Confirmation is not practiced in Baptist, Anabaptist and other groups that teach believer's baptism. Thus, the sacrament or rite of confirmation is administered to those being received from those aforementioned groups, in addition to those converts from non-Christian religions.

The Church of Jesus Christ of Latter-day Saints (LDS Church) does not practice infant baptism, but individuals can be baptized after they reach eight years old (the age of accountability). Confirmation in the LDS Church occurs shortly following baptism, which is not considered complete or fully efficacious until confirmation is received.

Various secular organizations also offer secular coming-of-age ceremonies as an alternative to Christian confirmation, while Unitarian Universalists have a similar coming-of-age ceremony.

== Scriptural foundation ==
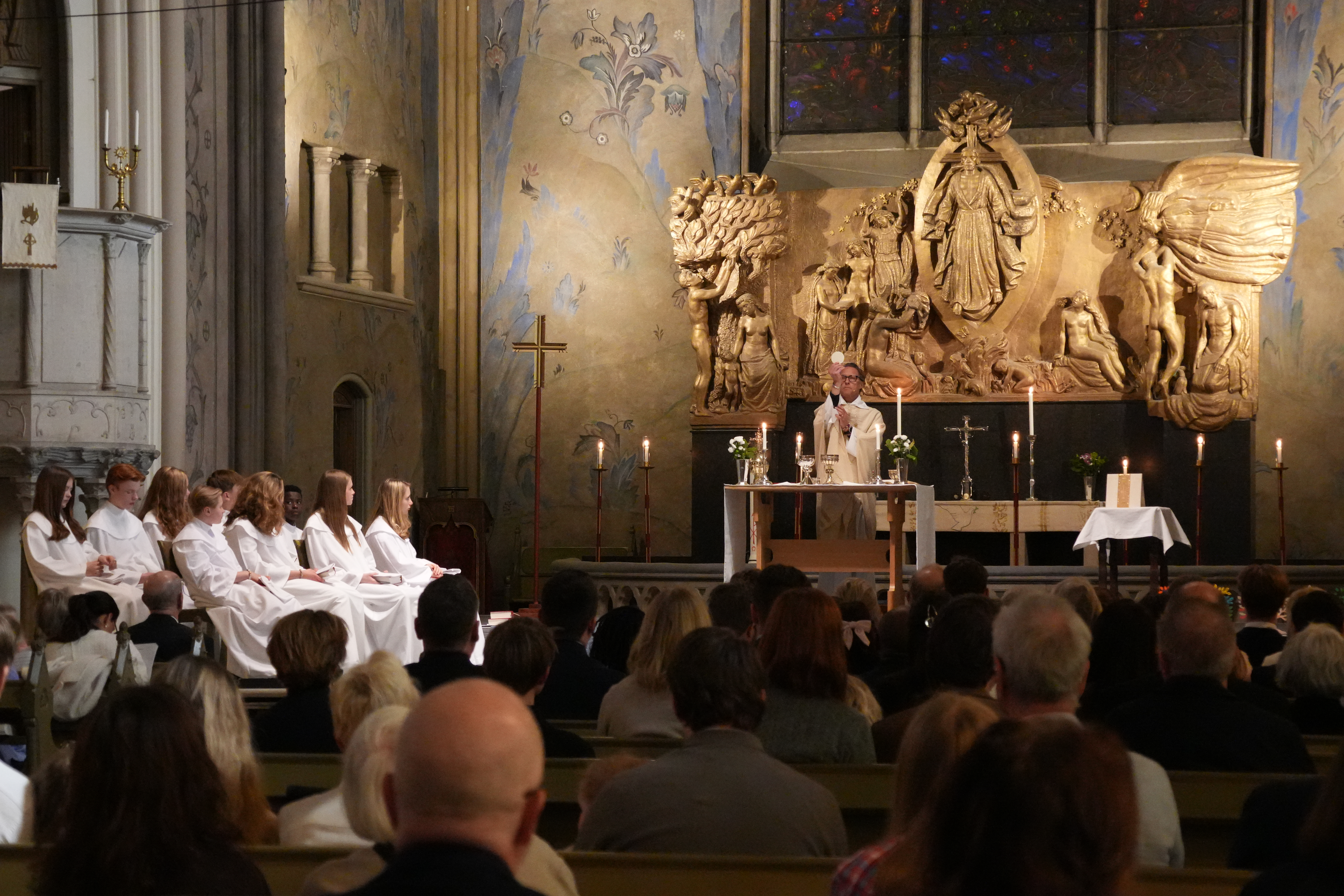
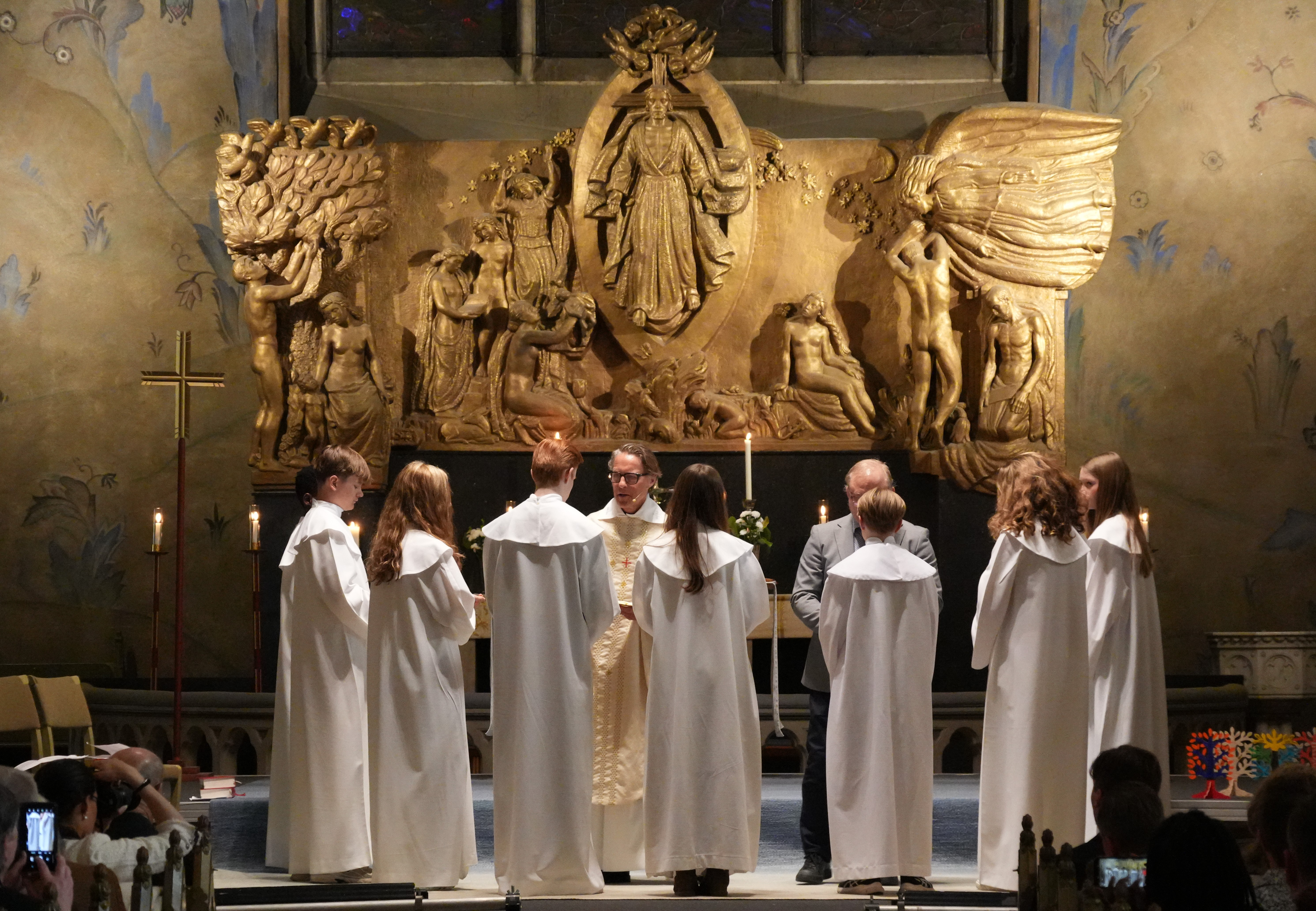
A priest of the Church of Sweden elevates the host before the congregation during a Confirmation Mass at Oscar's Evangelical-Lutheran Church on the Third Sunday of Eastertide (top image). The confirmands receive the Holy Eucharist (bottom image).

The roots of confirmation are found in the Church of the New Testament. In the Gospel of John chapter 14, Christ speaks of the coming of the Holy Spirit on the Apostles (John 14:15–26). Later, after his Resurrection, Jesus breathed upon them and they received the Holy Spirit (John 20:22), a process completed on the day of Pentecost (Acts 2:1–4). In Christianity, this Pentecostal outpouring of the Spirit was held as the sign of the messianic age foretold by the prophets (cf. Ezekiel 36:25–27; Joel 3:1–2). Its arrival was proclaimed by the Apostle Peter. Filled with the Holy Spirit, the apostles began to proclaim "the mighty works of God" (Acts 2:11; Cf. 2:17–18). After this point, the New Testament records the apostles bestowing the Holy Spirit upon others through the laying on of hands.

Three texts make it certain that a laying on of hands for the imparting of the Spirit – performed after the water-bath and as a complement to this bath – existed already in the earliest apostolic times. These texts are Acts 8:4–20 and 19:1–7, and Hebrews 6:1–6.

In the Acts of the Apostles 8:14–17, different ministers are named for the two actions. It is not deacon Philip, the baptiser, but only the apostles who were able to impart the pneuma through the laying on of hands:

Now when the apostles in Jerusalem heard that Samaria had accepted the word of God, they sent them Peter and John, who went down and prayed for them, that they might receive the holy Spirit, for it had not yet fallen upon any of them; they had only been baptized in the name of the Lord Jesus. Then they laid hands on them and they received the holy Spirit.

— Acts 8:14–17

Further on in the text, connection between the gift of the Holy Spirit and the gesture of laying on of hands appears even more clearly. Acts 8:18–19 introduces the request of Simon the Magician in the following way: "When Simon saw that the Spirit was given through the laying on of the apostles' hands". In Acts 19, baptism of the disciples is mentioned in quite general terms, without the minister being identified. Referring to 1 Corinthians 1:17, it can be presumed that Paul left the action of baptising to others. However, Acts 19:6 then expressly states that it was Apostle Paul who laid his hands upon the newly baptised. (Note: Though the author of Acts was likely an admirer of Paul, scholarly consensus is that the author "does not share Paul's own view of himself as an apostle; his own theology is considerably different from Paul's on key points and does not represent Paul's own views accurately"; it is also posited that the author of Acts did not have access to any of Paul's authentic letters, such as 1 Corinthians, which is widely considered to have been written by Paul himself, thus explaining the discrepancy between views.) Hebrews 6:1–6 distinguishes "the teaching about baptisms" from the teaching about "the laying on of hands". The difference may be understood in the light of the two passages in Acts 8 and 19.

== Christian denominational views ==
=== Catholic Church ===
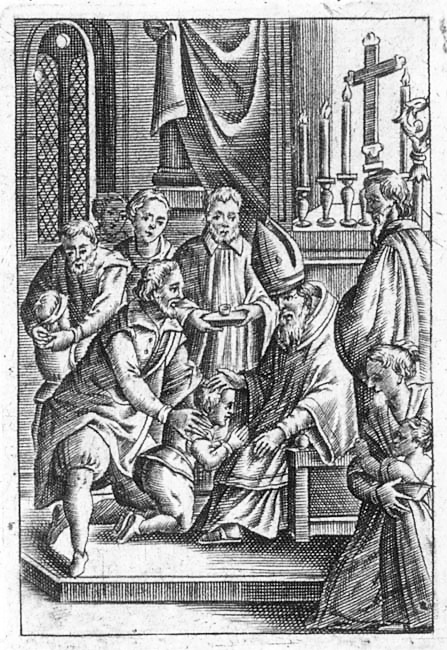
German woodcut depicting confirmation service (1679)

In the teaching of the Catholic Church, confirmation, known also as chrismation, is one of the seven sacraments instituted by Christ for the conferral of sanctifying grace and the strengthening of the union between the individual and God.

The Catechism of the Catholic Church in paragraphs 1302–1303, states:

It is evident from its celebration that the effect of the sacrament of Confirmation is the special outpouring of the Holy Spirit as once granted to the apostles on the day of Pentecost.

From this fact, Confirmation brings an increase and deepening of baptismal grace:

- it roots us more deeply in the divine filiation which makes us cry, "Abba! Father!" (Romans 8:15);
- it unites us more firmly to Christ;
- it increases the gifts of the Holy Spirit in us;
- it renders our bond with the Church more perfect;
- it gives us a special strength of the Holy Spirit to spread and defend the faith by word and action as true witnesses of Christ, to confess the name of Christ boldly, and never to be ashamed of the Cross:

Recall then that you have received the spiritual seal, the spirit of wisdom and understanding, the spirit of right judgment and courage, the spirit of knowledge and reverence, the spirit of holy fear in God's presence. Guard what you have received. God the Father has marked you with his sign; Christ the Lord has confirmed you and has placed his pledge, the Spirit, in your hearts.

— Catechism of the Catholic Church, paragraphs 1302–1303

In the Catholic Church, the sacrament is customarily conferred only on persons old enough to understand it, and the ordinary minister of confirmation is a bishop. "If necessity so requires", the diocesan bishop may grant specified priests the faculty to administer the sacrament, although normally he is to administer it himself or ensure that it is conferred by another bishop. In addition, the law itself confers the same faculty on the following:

[W]ithin the confines of their jurisdiction, those who in law are equivalent to a diocesan Bishop (for example, a vicar apostolic);

in respect of the person to be confirmed, the priest who by virtue of his office or by mandate of the diocesan Bishop baptises an adult or admits a baptised adult into full communion with the Catholic Church;

in respect of those in danger of death, the parish priest or indeed any priest.

"According to the ancient practice maintained in the Roman liturgy, an adult is not to be baptized unless he receives Confirmation immediately afterward, provided no serious obstacles exist." Administration of the two sacraments, one immediately after the other, to adults is normally done by the bishop of the diocese (generally at the Easter Vigil) since "the baptism of adults, at least of those who have completed their fourteenth year, is to be referred to the Bishop, so that he himself may confer it if he judges this appropriate" However, if the bishop does not confer the baptism, then it devolves on the priest whose office it then is to confer both sacraments, since, "in addition to the bishop, the law gives the faculty to confirm to the following, ... priests who, in virtue of an office which they lawfully hold, baptize an adult or a child old enough for catechesis or receive a validly baptized adult into full communion with the Church."

In Eastern Catholic Churches, the usual minister of this sacrament is the parish priest, using olive oil consecrated by a bishop (i.e. chrism) and administering the sacrament immediately after baptism. This corresponds exactly to the practice of the early Church, when at first those receiving baptism were mainly adults, and of the non-Latin Catholic Eastern Churches.

The practice of the Eastern Churches gives greater emphasis to the unity of Christian initiation. That of the Latin Church more clearly expresses the communion of the new Christian with the bishop as guarantor and servant of the unity, catholicity and apostolicity of his Church, and hence the connection with the apostolic origins of Christ's Church.

==== Rite of confirmation in the West ====
The main reason why the West separated the sacrament of confirmation from that of baptism was to re-establish direct contact between the person being initiated with the bishops. In the Early Church, the bishop administered all three sacraments of initiation (baptism, confirmation and Eucharist), assisted by the priests and deacons and, where they existed, by deaconesses for women's baptism. The post-baptismal chrismation in particular was reserved to the bishop. When adults no longer formed the majority of those being baptized, this chrismation was delayed until the bishop could confer it. Until the 12th century, priests often continued to confer confirmation before giving Communion to very young children.

After the Fourth Lateran Council, Communion, which continued to be given only after confirmation, was to be administered only on reaching the age of reason. Some time after the 13th century, the age of confirmation and Communion began to be delayed further, from seven, to twelve and to fifteen. In the 18th century, in France the sequence of sacraments of initiation was changed. Bishops started to impart confirmation only after the first Eucharistic communion. The reason was no longer the busy calendar of the bishop, but the bishop's will to give adequate instruction to the youth. The practice lasted until Pope Leo XIII in 1897 asked to restore the primary order and to celebrate confirmation back at the age of reason, a change that lasted less than two decades. In 1910, his successor, Pope Pius X, showing concern for the easy access to the Eucharist for children, in his Letter Quam Singulari lowered the age of first communion to seven. That was the origin of the widespread custom in parishes to organise the First Communion for children at 2nd grade and confirmation in middle or high school.

The 1917 Code of Canon Law, while recommending that confirmation be delayed until about seven years of age, allowed it be given at an earlier age. Only on 30 June 1932 was official permission given to change the traditional order of the three sacraments of Christian initiation: the Sacred Congregation for the Sacraments then allowed, where necessary, that confirmation be administered after first Holy Communion. This novelty, originally seen as exceptional, became more and more the accepted practice. Thus, in the mid-20th century, confirmation began to be seen as an occasion for professing personal commitment to the faith on the part of someone approaching adulthood.

However, the Catechism of the Catholic Church (1308) warns: "Although Confirmation is sometimes called the 'sacrament of Christian maturity,' we must not confuse adult faith with the adult age of natural growth, nor forget that the baptismal grace is a grace of free, unmerited election and does not need 'ratification' to become effective."

On the canonical age for confirmation in the Latin Church Catholic Church, the present 1983 Code of Canon Law, which maintains unaltered the rule in the 1917 Code, lays down that the sacrament is to be conferred on the faithful at about the age of discretion (generally taken to be about 7), unless the episcopal conference has decided on a different age, or there is a danger of death or, in the judgement of the minister, a grave reason suggests otherwise (canon 891 of the Code of Canon Law). The Code prescribes the age of discretion also for the sacraments of Reconciliation and first Holy Communion.

In some places the setting of a later age, e.g. mid-teens in the United States, 11 or 12 in Ireland and early teens in Britain, has been abandoned in recent decades in favor of restoring the traditional order of the three sacraments of Christian initiation. Even where a later age has been set, a bishop may not refuse to confer the sacrament on younger children who request it, provided they are baptized, have the use of reason, are suitably instructed and are properly disposed and able to renew the baptismal promises.

==== Effects of confirmation ====
The Catholic Church teaches that, like baptism, confirmation marks the recipient permanently, making it impossible to receive the sacrament twice. It accepts as valid a confirmation conferred within churches, such as the Eastern Orthodox Church, whose Holy Orders it sees as valid through the apostolic succession of their bishops. But it considers it necessary to administer the sacrament of confirmation, in its view for the only time, to Protestants who are admitted to full communion with the Catholic Church.

One of the effects of the sacrament is that "it gives us a special strength of the Holy Spirit to spread and defend the faith by word and action as true witnesses of Christ, to confess the name of Christ boldly, and never to be ashamed of the Cross". This effect was described by the Council of Trent as making the confirmed person "a soldier of Christ".

The same passage of the Catechism of the Catholic Church also mentions, as an effect of confirmation, that "it renders our bond with the Church more perfect". This mention stresses the importance of participation in the Christian community.

The "soldier of Christ" imagery was used, as far back as 350, by St Cyril of Jerusalem. In this connection, the touch on the cheek that the bishop gave while saying "Pax tecum" ('Peace be with you') to the person he had just confirmed was interpreted in the Roman Pontifical as a slap, a reminder to be brave in spreading and defending the faith: "Deinde leviter eum in maxilla caedit, dicens: Pax tecum" ('Then he strikes him lightly on the cheek, saying: Peace be with you'). When, in application of the Second Vatican Council's Constitution on the Sacred Liturgy, the confirmation rite was revised in 1971, mention of this gesture was omitted. However, the French and Italian translations, indicating that the bishop should accompany the words "Peace be with you" with "a friendly gesture" (French text) or "the sign of peace" (Italian text), explicitly allow a gesture such as the touch on the cheek, to which they restore its original meaning. This is in accord with the Introduction to the rite of confirmation, 17, which indicates that the episcopal conference may decide "to introduce a different manner for the minister to give the sign of peace after the anointing, either to each individual or to all the newly confirmed together".

==== Confirmation saint ====
In some regions it is customary for the person being confirmed to choose the name of a saint, which they adopt as their confirmation name. The saint whose name is taken is henceforth considered to be a patron saint.

=== Eastern Churches ===
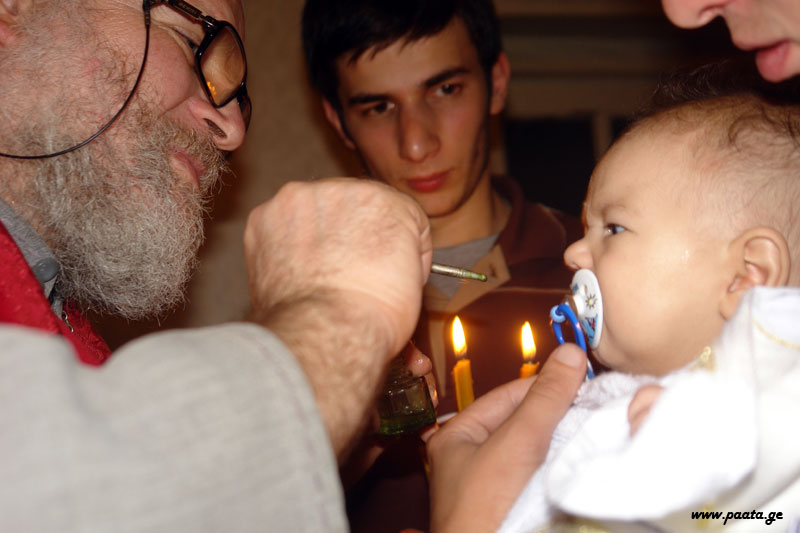
Chrismation of a newly baptized infant at a Georgian Orthodox church

The Eastern Orthodox, Oriental Orthodox and Eastern Catholic churches refer to this sacrament (or, more properly, Sacred Mystery) as chrismation, a term which western rite Catholics also use; for instance, in Italian the term is cresima. Eastern Christians link chrismation closely with the sacred mystery of baptism, conferring it immediately after baptism, which is normally on infants.

The sacred tradition of the Orthodox Church teaches that the Apostles themselves established the practice of anointing with chrism (consecrated oil) in place of the laying on of hands when bestowing the sacrament. As the numbers of converts grew, it became physically impossible for the apostles to lay hands upon each of the newly baptized. So the Apostles laid hands upon a vessel of oil, bestowing the Holy Spirit upon it, which was then distributed to all of the presbyters (priests) for their use when they baptized. The same chrism is in use to this day, never being completely depleted but newly consecrated chrism only being added to it as needed (this consecration traditionally is performed only by the primates of certain autocephalous churches on Great Thursday) and it is believed that chrism in use today contains some small amount of the original chrism made by the apostles.

When Catholics and traditional Protestants, such as Lutherans and Anglicans, convert to Orthodoxy, they are often admitted by chrismation, without baptism; but, since this is a matter of local episcopal discretion, a bishop may require all converts to be admitted by baptism if he deems it necessary. Depending upon the form of the original baptism, some Protestants must be baptized upon conversion to Orthodoxy. A common practice is that those persons who have been previously baptized by triple immersion in the name of the Trinity do not need to be baptized. However, requirements will differ from jurisdiction to jurisdiction and some traditional Orthodox jurisdictions prefer to baptize all converts. When a person is received into the church, whether by baptism or chrismation, they will often take the name of a saint, who will become their patron saint. Thenceforward, the feast day of that saint will be celebrated as the convert's name day, which in traditional Orthodox cultures is celebrated in lieu of one's birthday.

The Orthodox rite of chrismation takes place immediately after baptism and clothing the "newly illumined" (i.e., newly baptized) in their baptismal robe. The priest makes the sign of the cross with the chrism (also referred to as myrrh) on the brow, eyes, nostrils, lips, both ears, breast, hands and feet of the newly illumined, saying with each anointing: "The seal of the gift of the Holy Spirit. Amen." Then the priest will place his epitrachelion (stole) over the newly illumined and leads them and their sponsors in a procession, circling three times around the Gospel Book, while the choir chants each time: "As many as have been baptized into Christ have put on Christ. Alleluia" (Galatians 3:27).

The reason the Eastern Churches perform chrismation immediately after baptism is so that the newly baptized may receive Holy Communion, which is commonly given to infants as well as adults.

An individual may be baptized in extremis (in a life-threatening emergency) by any baptized member of the church; however, only a priest or bishop may perform the mystery of chrismation. If someone who has been baptized in extremis survives, the priest then performs the chrismation.

The Catholic Church does not confirm converts to Catholicism who have been chrismated in a non-Catholic Eastern church, considering that the sacrament has been validly conferred and may not be repeated.

In the Eastern Orthodox Church the sacrament may be conferred more than once and it is customary to receive returning or repentant apostates by repeating chrismation.

=== Lutheran Churches ===
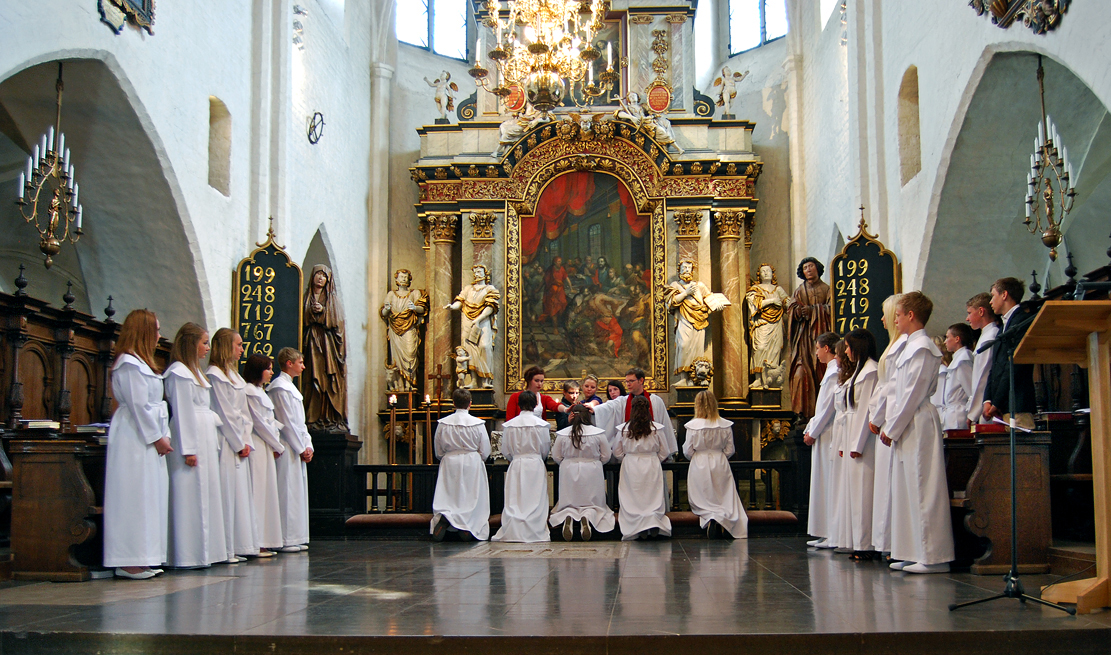
Confirmation in St. Mary's Church, Ystad, Sweden, 2011

Lutheran confirmation is a public profession of faith prepared for by long and careful catechetical instruction. In English, it is called "affirmation of baptism", and is a mature and public profession of the faith which "marks the completion of the congregation's program of confirmation ministry". The German language uses a different word for Lutheran confirmation (Konfirmation) from the word used for the sacramental rite of the Catholic Church (Firmung).

The Rite of Confirmation of the Lutheran Churches includes:

The confirmands are addressed.
The Creed.
Confirmation vows.
Blessing of each confirmand.

The Lord's Prayer.

The Lutheran rite of confirmation enjoins the laying on of hands upon each of the candidates, with certain Missals such as Evangelical Lutheran Worship including an invocation of the Holy Spirit to stir up in the confirmands the Gifts of the Holy Spirit received in the sacrament of Holy Baptism: "Stir up in them the gift of your Holy Spirit: the spirit of wisdom and understanding, the spirit of counsel and might, the spirit of knowledge and the fear of the Lord, the spirit of joy in your presence, both now and forever."

Lutheran Churches treat confirmation as a rite, not as a dominical sacrament of the Gospel, considering that only Baptism, Eucharist and Confession and Absolution can be regarded as sacraments. Some popular Sundays for this to occur are Palm Sunday, Pentecost and Reformation Sunday (last Sunday in October).

=== Anglican Communion ===
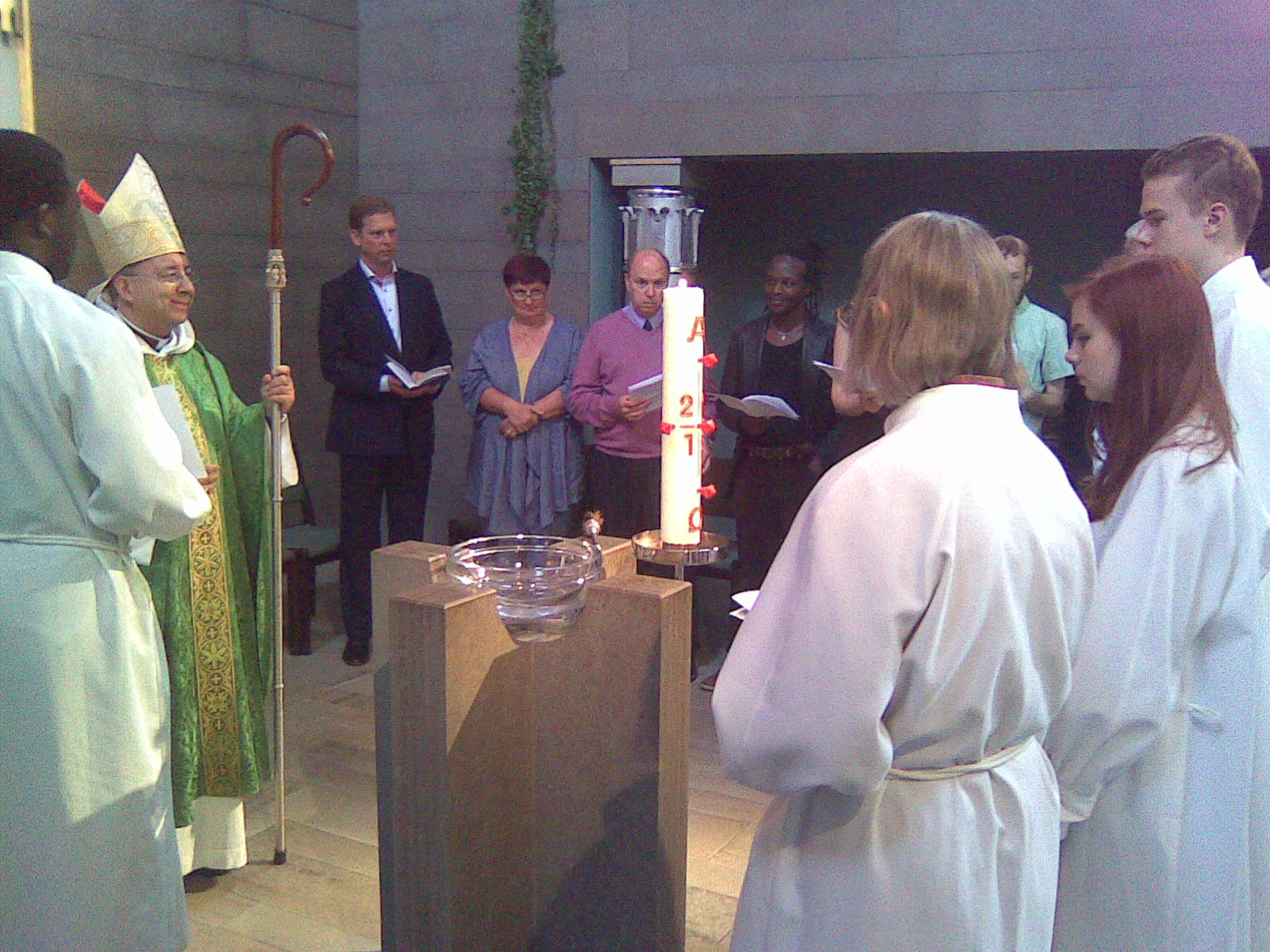
David Hamid, suffragan bishop in Europe, administering an Anglican Confirmation at the Mikael Agricola Church in Helsinki

Article 25 of the 16th-century Thirty-nine Articles lists confirmation among those rites "commonly called Sacraments" which are "not to be counted for Sacraments of the Gospel" (a term referring to the dominical sacraments, i.e. baptism and the Holy Eucharist), because they were not directly instituted by Christ with a specific matter and form, and they are not generally necessary to salvation.

In Anglicanism, confirmation is the culmination of catechetical instruction provided to the candidate, an emphasis made prominent under the guiding reformer of the Protestant Reformation in England, Thomas Cranmer. Under the influence of Martin Bucer, the 1548 Catechism emphasized confirmation "as an examination of those who have been instructed in the articles and commandments of the faith and are ready to make a profession of the promises made on their behalf at Baptism."

"[T]he renewal of the baptismal vows, which is part of the Anglican Confirmation service, is in no way necessary to Confirmation and can be done more than once. ... When Confirmation is given early, candidates may be asked to make a fresh renewal of vows when they approach adult life at about eighteen." The 1662 Book of Common Prayer of the Church of England employs the phrase "ratify and confirm" with respect to these vows which has led to the common conception of confirmation as the renewal of baptismal vows. As with Lutheran theology, the Anglican prayer book makes it "clear that Baptism involves full initiation into the church, including the gift of the Holy Spirit" and "Confirmation involves prayer for the 'daily increase' of a gift already given."

Though confirmation is seen as a rite by many Anglicans (especially those of an Evangelical Reformed churchmanship), Anglicans of Anglo-Catholic churchmanship count the confirmation as one of the sacraments. While most provinces of the Anglican Communion do not make provision for ministers other than bishops to administer confirmation, presbyters can be authorized to do so in certain South Asian provinces, which are united churches. Similarly, the American Episcopal Church recognizes that "those who have previously made a mature public commitment in another Church may be received by the laying on of hands by a Bishop of this Church, rather than confirmed." Furthermore, at its General Convention in 2015 a resolution advancing presbyteral confirmation was referred to committee for further review.

=== Methodist Churches ===
In the Methodist Church confirmation is defined by the Articles of Religion as one those "Commonly called Sacraments but not to be counted for Sacraments of the Gospel", also known as the "five lesser sacraments". The Methodist Worship Book declares that:

In Confirmation, those who have been baptized declare their faith in Christ and are Strengthened by the Holy Spirit for continuing discipleship. Confirmation reminds us that we are baptized and that God continues to be at work in our lives: we respond by affirming that we belong to Christ and to the whole People of God. At a Service of Confirmation, baptized Christians are also received into membership of the Methodist Church and take their place as such in a local congregation.

— Baptism and Confirmation, The Methodist Church in Britain

By Water and Spirit, an official United Methodist publication, states that "it should be emphasized that Confirmation is what the Holy Spirit does. Confirmation is a divine action, the work of the Spirit empowering a person 'born through water and the Spirit' to 'live as a faithful disciple of Jesus Christ'." The Methodist theologian John William Fletcher saw confirmation as a means of grace. Furthermore, confirmation is the individual's first public affirmation of the grace of God in baptism and the acknowledgment of the acceptance of that grace by faith. For those baptized as infants, it often occurs when youth enter their 6th through 8th grade years, but it may occur earlier or later. For youth and adults who are joining the Church, "those who are baptized are also confirmed, remembering that our ritual reflects the ancient unity of baptism, confirmation (laying on of hands with prayer), and Eucharist." Candidates to be confirmed, known as confirmands, take a class which covers Christian doctrine, theology, Methodist Church history, stewardship, basic Bible study and other topics.

While the Holy Spirit strengthens the believer in confirmation, in Methodist theology, it is through entire sanctification that a believer is baptized (filled) with the Holy Spirit, thus being made perfect in love and wholly devoted to God, cleansed of original sin (the carnal nature), and empowered to accomplish all to which they are called. John Fletcher saw the attainment of entire sanctification as being the goal of the vows made at the ordinance of confirmation. John Wesley laid emphasis "upon a personal, non-ceremonial experience of sanctifying grace" and this second work of grace—entire sanctification—distinguishes Methodism.

=== Presbyterian, Congregationalist and Continental Reformed Churches ===
The Presbyterian Church in America process of confirmation is not necessarily public, and depends on the congregation as to the nature of confirmation. In practice, many churches require and offer classes for Confirmation.

The Presbyterian Church (U.S.A.) confirmation process is a profession of faith that "seeks to provide youth with a foundational understanding of our faith, tradition and Presbyterian practices".

=== Irvingian Churches ===
In the New Apostolic Church, the largest of the Irvingian denominations, Confirmation is a rite that "strengthens the confirmands in their endeavour to keep their vow to profess Jesus Christ in word and deed". Confirmation is celebrated within the Divine Service and in it, confirmands take the following vow:

I renounce Satan and all his work and ways, and surrender myself to You, O triune God, Father, Son, and Holy Spirit, in belief, obedience, and the earnest resolution to remain faithful to You until my end. Amen.

Following the recitation of the vow, "young Christians receive the confirmation blessing, which is dispensed upon them through laying on of hands".

=== United Protestant Churches ===
In United Protestant Churches, such as the United Church of Canada, Church of North India, Church of Pakistan, Church of South India, Uniting Church in Australia and United Church of Christ in Japan, confirmation is a rite that is "understood as a Christian person assuming the responsibilities of the promises made at baptism."

=== The Church of Jesus Christ of Latter-day Saints ===
When discussing confirmation, The Church of Jesus Christ of Latter-day Saints (LDS Church) uses the term ordinance owing to their origins in a Protestant environment, but the actual doctrine describing their ordinances and their effects is sacramental. Church ordinances are understood as administering grace and must be conducted by properly ordained clergy members through apostolic succession reaching back through Peter to Christ, although the line of authority differs from Catholics and Eastern Orthodox. Baptism by water is understood as representing the death of the old person and their resurrection from that death into a new life in Christ. Through baptism by water, sin and guilt are washed away as the old sinner dies and the new child of Christ emerges. Confirmation is understood as being the baptism by fire wherein the Holy Spirit enters into the individual, purges them of the effects of the sin from their previous life (the guilt and culpability of which were already washed away), and introduces them into the church as a new person in Christ. Through confirmation, the individual receives the Gift of the Holy Ghost, granting the individual the permanent companionship of the Holy Ghost as long as the person does not wilfully drive him away through sin.

The ceremony is significantly simpler than in Catholic or Eastern Orthodox churches and is performed by an ordained clergyman as follows:

1. Lays his hands upon the individual's head and states the person's full name.
2. States that the ordinance is performed by the authority of the Melchizedek Priesthood.
3. Confirms the person a member of the LDS Church.
4. Bestows the gift of the Holy Ghost by saying, "Receive the Holy Ghost."
5. Gives a priesthood blessing as the Spirit directs.
6. Closes in the name of Jesus Christ.

Other actions typically associated with confirmation in Catholicism or Eastern Orthodoxy, such as the reception of a Christian name, anointing of body parts with chrism, and the clothing of the confirmant in a white garment or chiton are conducted separately as part of a ceremony called the Initiatory.

== Confirmation name ==
In many countries, it is customary for a person being confirmed in some dioceses of the Catholic Church and in parts of Lutheranism and Anglicanism to adopt a new name, generally the name of a biblical character or saint, thus securing an additional patron saint as protector and guide. The practice in the Roman Catholic tradition is not mentioned in the official liturgical book of the rite of confirmation and is not in use in Spanish and French-speaking lands, nor in Italy, Belgium, the Netherlands or the Philippines. Although some insist on the custom, it is discouraged by others and in any case is only a secondary aspect of confirmation.

As indicated by the different senses of the word christening, baptism and the giving of a personal name have traditionally been linked. At confirmation, in which the intervention of a godparent strengthens a resemblance with baptism, it became customary to take a new name, as was also the custom on other occasions, in particular that of religious profession. King Henry III of France (1551–1589) was christened Edouard Alexandre in 1551, but at confirmation received the name Henri, by which he afterwards reigned. Today usually no great use is made of the confirmation name, although some treat it as an additional middle name. For example, A Song of Ice and Fire author George R. R. Martin was born George Raymond Martin, but added his confirmation name (Richard) as a second middle name. However, even after the English Reformation, the legal system of that country admitted the lawfulness of using one's confirmation name in, for instance, purchasing land.

== Repetition of the sacrament or rite ==
The Catholic Church sees confirmation as one of the three sacraments that no one can receive more than once (see sacramental character). It recognizes as already confirmed those who enter the Catholic Church after receiving the sacrament, even as babies, in the churches of Eastern Christianity, but it confers the sacrament (in its view, for the first and only time) on those who enter the Catholic Church after being confirmed in Protestant churches, seeing these churches as lacking properly ordained ministers.

In the Lutheran Churches, those individuals who received the sacrament of baptism according to the Trinitarian formula in a non-Lutheran church are confirmed as Lutherans, ordinarily during the Easter Vigil—the first liturgy of Eastertide. The rite of confirmation is preceded by a period of catechetical instruction.

In the Anglican Communion, a person who was previously confirmed in another denomination by a bishop or priest recognized as validly ordained is "received" rather than confirmed again. Some dioceses of the Protestant Episcopal Church in the United States of America recognize non-episcopal Confirmations as well and these individuals are received into the Anglican Communion rather than re-confirmed. In other dioceses, confirmations of those Christian denominations are recognized if they have a valid apostolic succession in the eyes of the Anglican Communion (e.g. Evangelical Lutheran Church in America, Catholic Church, etc.).

Eastern Orthodox churches occasionally practise "Chrismation", whereby they usually chrismate/confirm – and sometimes rebaptize – a convert who was previously a non-Orthodox Christian (Catholic or Protestant), even if one was previously confirmed/baptized in other churches. The justification is that the new Chrismation (or baptism) is the only valid one, the earlier one being administered outside of the Church and hence being little more than a symbol. The Eastern Orthodox will also chrismate an apostate from the Orthodox Church who repents and re-enters communion. According to some interpretations, the Eastern churches therefore view confirmation/Chrismation as a repeatable sacrament. According to others, the rite is understood as "part of a process of reconciliation, rather than as a reiteration of post-baptismal chrismation".

== Analogous ceremonies in non-Christian practice ==
=== Judaism ===
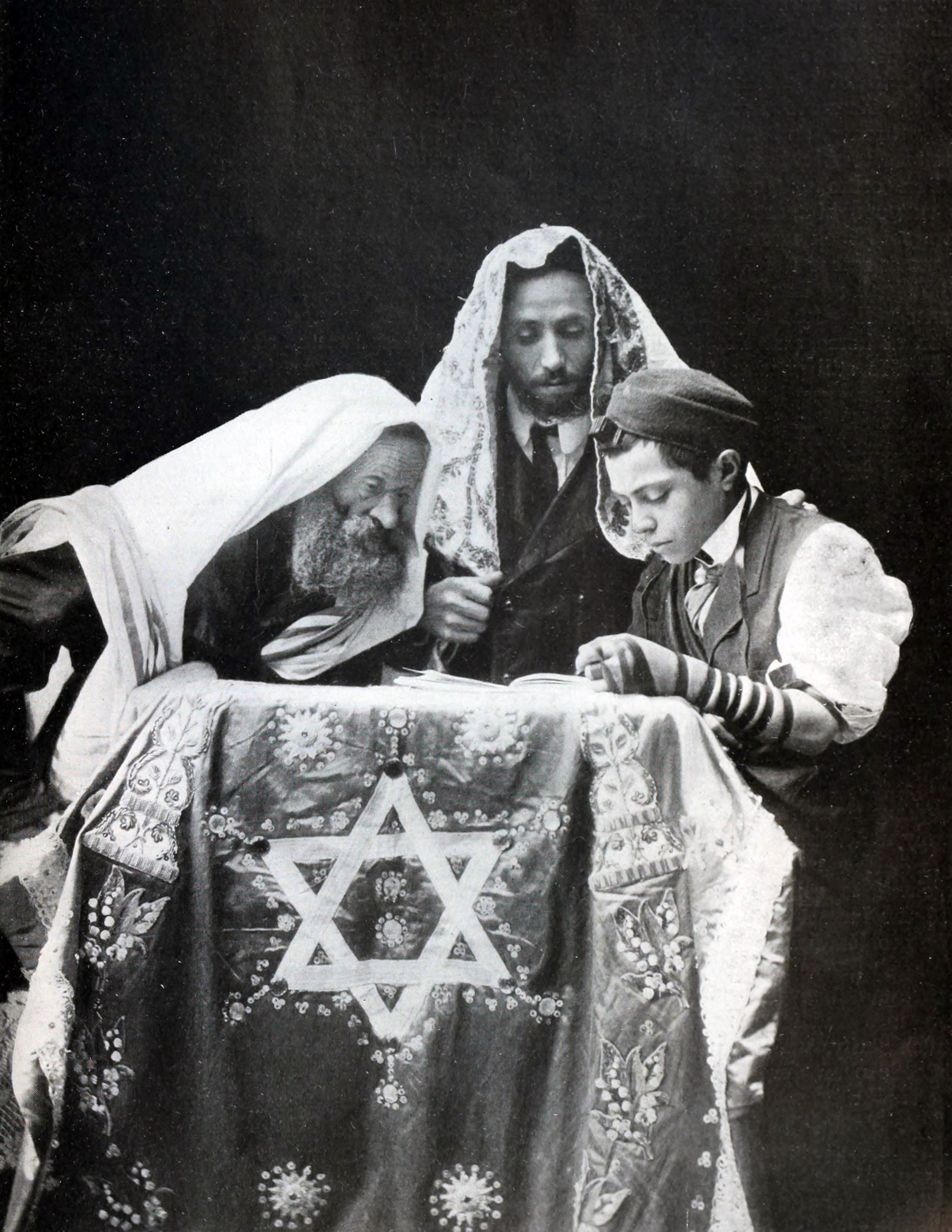
Jewish confirmation c. 1900

In the 1800s Reform Judaism developed a separate ceremony, called confirmation, loosely modeled on Christian confirmation ceremonies. This occurred because, at the time, Reform Jews believed that it was inappropriate for bar/bat mitzvah-age children to be considered mature enough to understand what it means to be religious. It was held that children of this age were not responsible enough to understand what it means to observe religious practices. Israel Jacobson developed the confirmation ceremony to replace bar/bat mitzvah. Originally this ceremony was for 13-year-old boys. In later decades, the Reform movement modified this view, and now much of Reform Judaism in the United States encourages children to celebrate becoming bar/bat mitzvah at the traditional age, and then has the confirmation at the later age as a sign of a more advanced completion of their Jewish studies.

Today, many Reform Jewish congregations hold confirmation ceremonies as a way of marking the biblical festival of Shavuot and the decision of young adults to embrace Jewish study in their lives and reaffirm their commitment to the Covenant. The confirmands represent "the first fruits of each year's harvest. They represent the hope and promise of tomorrow." Confirmation is typically held in tenth grade after a year of study, but some synagogues celebrate it in other years of high school.

Confirmation, in the context of Reform Judaism, was mentioned officially for the first time in an ordinance issued by the Jewish consistory of the kingdom of Westphalia at Cassel in 1810. There it was made the duty of the rabbi "to prepare the young for confirmation, and personally to conduct the ceremony." At first only boys were confirmed, on the Sabbath ("Shabbat") that they celebrated becoming Bar Mitzvah; the ceremony was performed at the home or in the schoolroom. In Berlin, Jewish girls were confirmed for the first time in 1817, in Hamburg in 1818.

Confirmation was at first excluded from the synagogue, because, like every innovation, it met with stern opposition from more traditional rabbis. Gradually, however, it found more favor; Hebrew school classes were confirmed together, and confirmation gradually became a solemn celebration at the synagogue. In 1822 the first class of boys and girls was confirmed at the Hamburg Temple, and in 1831 Rabbi Samuel Egers, a prominent traditional rabbi of his time, began to confirm boys and girls at the synagogue of Brunswick. While in the beginning some Shabbat, frequently during Chanukah or Passover, was selected for confirmation, it became increasingly customary, following the example of Egers, to perform the ceremony during the biblical festival of Shavuot ("Feast of Weeks"). It was felt that Shavuot was well suited for the rite, as it celebrated the occasion when the Israelites on Mount Sinai declared their intention to accept the yoke of God's Law, so those of every new generation should follow the ancient example and declare their willingness to be faithful to the Sinaitic covenant transmitted by their ancestors.

Confirmation was introduced in Denmark as early as 1817, in Hamburg in 1818, and in Hessen and Saxony in 1835. The Prussian government, which showed itself hostile to the Reform movement, prohibited it as late as 1836, as did Bavaria as late as 1838. It soon made its way, however, into all progressive congregations of Germany. In 1841 it was introduced in France, first in Bordeaux and Marseilles, then in Strasburg and Paris, under the name initiation religieuse. The first Israelitish synod in 1869 at Leipsic adopted a report on religious education, the 13th section of which contains an elaborate opinion on confirmation, recommending the same to all Jewish congregations. In America, the annual confirmation of boys and girls was first resolved upon by the congregation of Temple Emanu-El of New York in 1847. The ceremony soon gained so firm a foothold in America that soon there was no progressive Jewish congregation in which it did not occur during Shavuot.

=== Secular confirmations ===
Several secular, mainly Humanist, organizations direct civil confirmations for older children, as a statement of their life stance that is an alternative to traditional religious ceremonies for children of that age.

Some atheist regimes have as a matter of policy fostered the replacement of Christian rituals such as confirmation with non-religious ones. In the historically Protestant German Democratic Republic (East Germany), for example, "the Jugendweihe (youth dedication) gradually supplanted the Christian practice of Confirmation." A concept that first appeared in 1852, the Jugendweihe is described as "a solemn initiation marking the transition from youth to adulthood that was developed in opposition to Protestant and Catholic Churches' Confirmation."

== See also ==
- Rite of passage
