= Confirmation dress =

Dress designed to be worn by girls at Confirmation

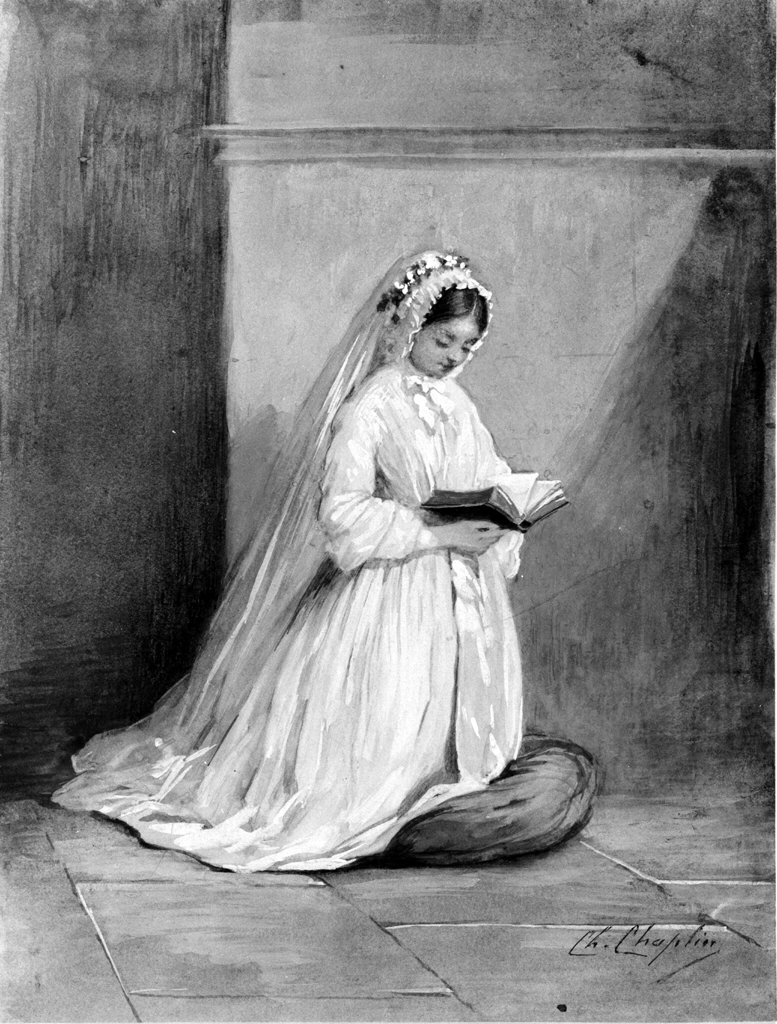
Girl in Confirmation Dress at Prayer (1860) C. Chaplin

The Confirmation dress is a traditional style of dress that was designed to be worn by girls partaking in the Catholic or Lutheran ritual of Confirmation.

Confirmation is the public declaration, made by children or young adults who have already been baptized in their infancy, to follow the Christian faith in their adult life. The traditions of this ritual vary between the different branches of the Christian religion, however, the dress has remained similar across some of the denominations.

The traditional design of the dress mimics the design of a bride's wedding dress relating to the historic view of young women in the church. Today, however, wearing the traditional Confirmation dress is not always enforced or expected. Rather, simple white garments, robes, or white dresses that vary from the traditional design are often worn.

== Traditional design ==
The main feature of the traditional Confirmation dress was to be 'perfectly plain' and 'simple'. In 1868, Harper's Bazaar described the ideal style as: "Swiss muslin dress with high neck and long sleeves. The bottom of the skirt is trimmed with a flounce a quarter of a yard wide. Bias folds simulate a Pompadour waist. White silk buttons close the corsage... A white veil completes the costume."

Other common traditional designs included a visible lack of shaping in the bodice to de-emphasize the female figure, with waist definition provided by a belt and gathered skirts. In April 1874, Harper's Bazaar stated that white dresses of white silk, tarlatan and tulle were being made in abundance in New York for Confirmations and First Communions. These designs featured 'puffs' in the skirt and sleeves, and ruffle trims.

A black dress was worn in the 19th century by many in the Netherlands as a somber recognition of the 'gravity' of Confirmation on the participants' lives. In 1868, Harper's Bazaar also described a common fashion of Confirmation dresses as black with a high neck and "close sleeves", worn with a black shawl, which was embroidered and trimmed with either a black satin ribbon or a fringe.

== Symbolic significance ==
In the Christian religion, white garments are significant because the color symbolizes being pure and clean. In Confirmation, Christians are transformed by God and now share in His Holy Spirit, which makes them clean, thus, the white garment signifies that the wearer has been transformed. The white dress theologically aligns with a Bible passage in Revelation 7:9, that describes a great multitude of people coming before the Lamb of God, wearing white garments.

The color white is also symbolic of virginity. Traditionally, the white dress and veil, are symbolic of the wearer's chastity, purity and obedience to God. Because Confirmation is a ritual that symbolizes the child's 'coming-of-age' and their dedication to Christ in their adult life, the bride-like design of the traditional Confirmation dress was symbolic of women's purity before marriage - as well as the theological concept that, while commitment to marriage is good, virginity is better.

As the traditional design of the girls' Confirmation dress was styled after a bride, the same significance is true in wearing of the veil. Because Christian virgin women were seen as a bride of Christ and often wear veils, that accessory was also considered appropriate for Confirmation. The amount that the child's parents spend on Confirmation garments is indicative of their socio-economic status. Especially in the Catholic group performance of Confirmation, the more conspicuous styles and higher quality fabrics and accessories will make those children stand out from other confirmands.

Confirmation is a rite of passage from childhood to adulthood is also symbolized in the Confirmation dress. Often girls still in their childhood wear clothing such as knee-length skirt which allows them to run and play. However, in Confirmation, young girls wear floor-length skirts or dresses symbolizing a transition from their old childhood garments to the attire of grown women.

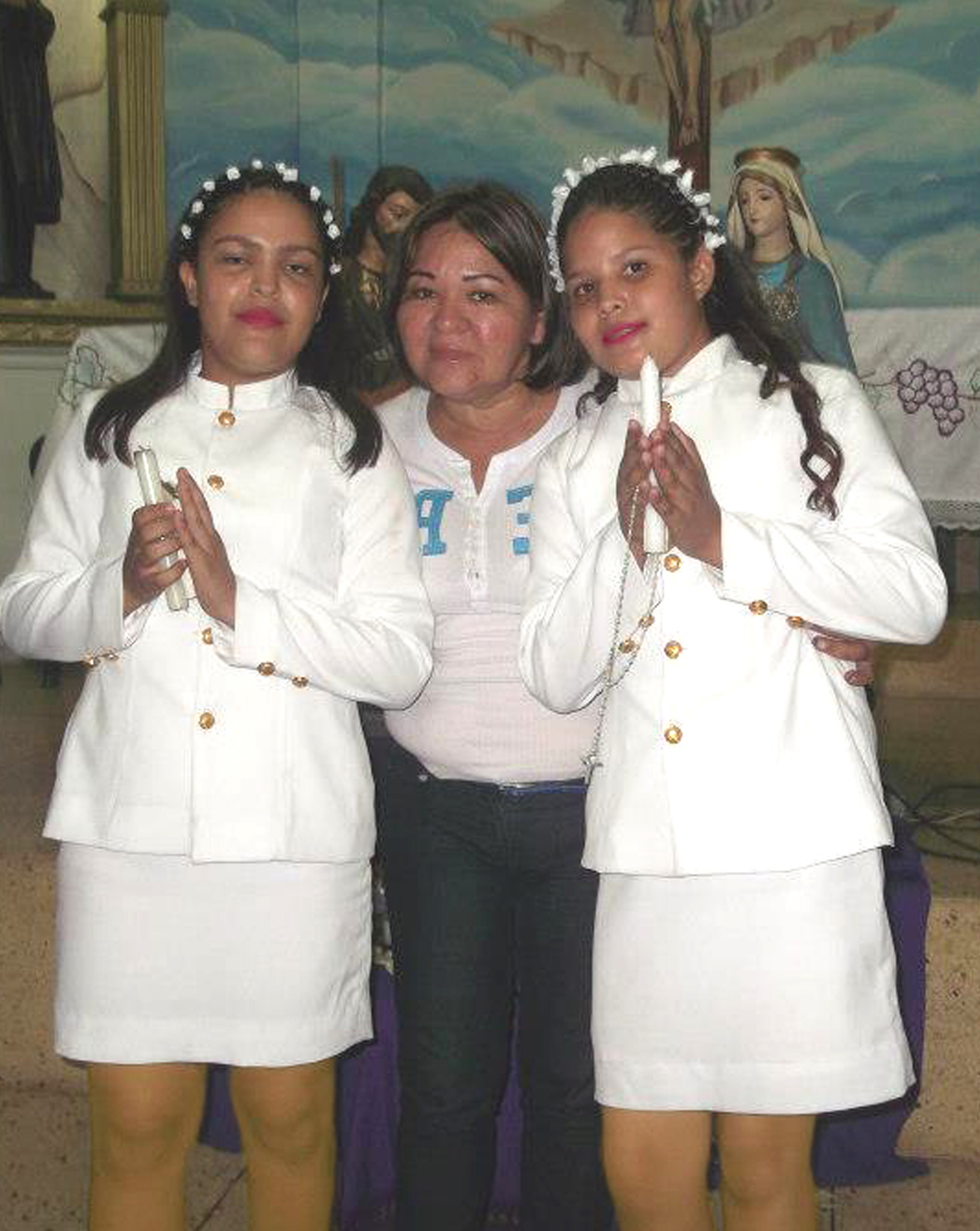
Modern Confirmation attire

== Modern dress codes ==
Today, some parishes suggest Confirmation participants wear identical, gender-neutral clothing. This is often the case for white gowns which are to be worn over, and covering, discreet outfits, especially in the Roman Catholic churches

The traditional white dress, however, is still commonly used in the ritual today with the same symbolic intent as previously.

Often participants wear simple and elegant white garments that include the symbols of traditional design but follow modern but modest fashion styles. Many churches introduced a 'Confirmation dress code' for both males and females that effectively involves wearing their 'Sunday best' or 'Christmas/Easter best'. Dress codes are often regulated by the individual churches or dioceses, with restrictions as follows:

- No sleeveless dresses or blouses.
- No "backless" dresses or blouses.
- No jeans, shorts or tight-fitting pants.
- Dresses or skirts should be knee-length, or not more than 1-2 inches above the knee.
- Dresses or blouses which leave the shoulders bare should be worn with a matching jacket.
- Dresses or blouses should not have a low neckline.
- Dresses or blouses should not be tight-fitting.
- Dresses or blouses should not be made from a transparent fabric.

== Representations ==
=== Literature ===
In fictitious representations of the Confirmation, or First Communion, the dress is a traditional symbol. In these representations, the dressing of the girl before Confirmation symbolizes the parents grooming the girl into the traditions of the belief system.

In the literary work of Olive Senior (in her collection of short stories: Summer Lightning & Other Stories) the traditional Confirmation dress is likened to the Biblical parable of the Ten Virgins. In Senior's writing, the similarity between the wisdom or foolishness of the women in the parable is compared to the innocence or maturity of the main character as she is prepared for First Communion.

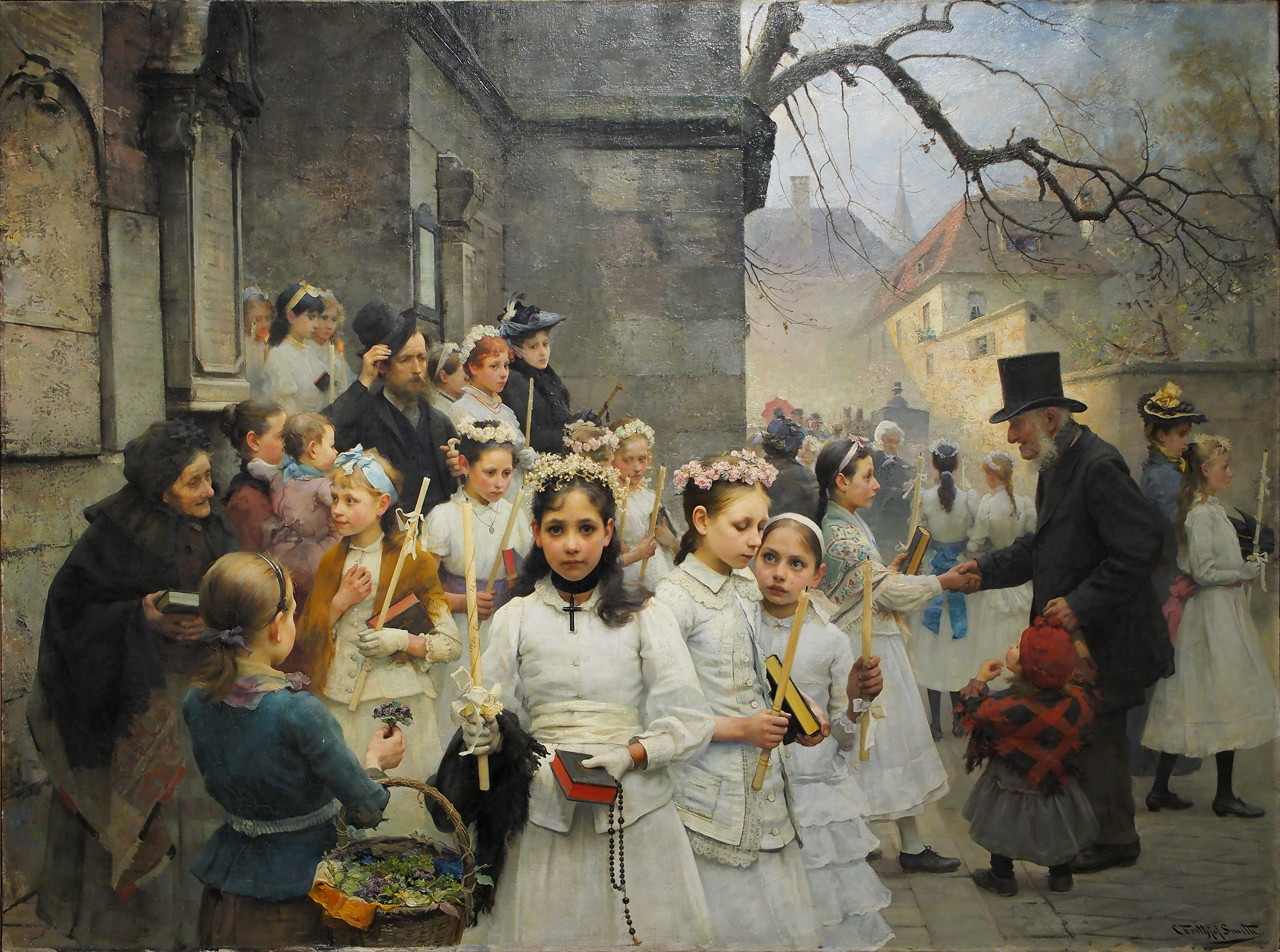
'After First Communion' (1892) Carl Frithjof Smith

The Confirmation dress is featured several times in M. NourbeSe Phillip's 1989 poetry anthology She Tries Her Tongue, Her Silence Softly Breaks, especially the poem Over Every Land and Sea. In this poem, the whiteness of the Confirmation dress is contrasted against the wearer's dark legs and the 'stiff' crinoline. Described as being worn by a girl in the negative of a photograph, the white dress is represented as dark-shaded. The dress is later described as yellowing, just as the picture itself has yellowed from its previous white state.

=== Art ===
The Confirmation dress is also represented in art. For example, C. Chaplin's Girl at Confirmation Dress at Prayer (see image at top of page), where the dress is iconically white and round, giving a cherub-like effect Another painting that features the Confirmation dress is Carl Frithjof Smith's 1892 After First Communion. These images often include other symbols of Confirmation such as prayer books, candles, and prayer beads.

== Feminist response ==
For feminist religious scholars, the traditional adornment of young girls as brides when participating in the Roman Catholic First Communion ritual is perceived as an initiation into patriarchal disempowerment. The ritual is seen to be a 'push' for young girls to take up the role of bride and mother in what the scholar Jennifer Stith calls the "blind subjugation" of the patriarchal construct of Catholic ritual and doctrine. This view condemns the traditional style of Confirmation dress, claiming that it has a negative impact on the young girls partaking in First Communion and Confirmation and teaches a woman's position in the Catholic church is to marry and have children.

Another feminist perception is that the confirmation attire is a symbol used to 'cover over' the young girls that infers a removal of their status as human beings.
