= Succession in the Presidency (LDS Church) =

Procedure in the LDS Church

Succession in the Presidency in the Church of Jesus Christ of Latter-day Saints (LDS Church) is the procedure that is followed between the death of one church president and the appointment of another.

== Summary ==
=== Established protocol ===
At the head of the LDS Church are fifteen men: three of them, the church president and his two counselors, form the church's highest council, the First Presidency. In addition, a council serving the church in a role secondary to that of the First Presidency is the Quorum of the Twelve Apostles.

- At the death of a church president, the First Presidency is automatically dissolved. The counselors to the deceased church president resume their former positions in the Quorum of the Twelve Apostles, if they had been drawn from that Quorum, and the church enters an apostolic interregnum wherein the Quorum of the Twelve serves as the presiding body of the church, under the direction of the quorum president (who thus serves essentially as the de facto Acting President of the Church).
- The quorum president – invariably the quorum member with longest tenure – possesses the authority to receive revelation to reorganize the First Presidency. If and when he does so, he counsels together with the Twelve on this matter. According to the pattern established when Spencer W. Kimball became the church president in the early 1970s, the Twelve meet to discuss the issue of reorganization on the Sunday following the funeral services held for the previous church president. If the Quorum is unanimous, they proceed to set apart, by the laying on of hands by all the apostles, the new president, as well as the two counselors he has chosen, in order to form the new First Presidency. These counselors may be chosen from any holder of the Melchizedek priesthood. In most cases they are chosen from among the members of the Quorum of Twelve Apostles.
- To fill the vacancy arising in the Quorum of the Twelve when its president becomes the church president, or from quorum members leaving the quorum to serve as counselors in the First Presidency, the newly formed First Presidency meet and counsel together in order to recommend Melchizedek Priesthood holders to be called to fill the vacancy, or vacancies. Members of the Quorum of the Twelve can also make recommendations for consideration. The final decision rests with the church president. It is formally voted on, or sustained, by the Twelve and the counselors in the First Presidency.

This, and other church policy decisions, are made unanimously, with consultation among the First Presidency, the Quorum of the Twelve, and where appropriate, the Seventy, each of which has its own responsibility. Efforts are made to ensure the organizations are united in purpose and policy.

The man chosen is generally ordained an apostle by the President of the Church, a counselor in the First Presidency, or the President of the Twelve.

- At the next semi-annual general conference, the membership of the church has the opportunity of sustaining their new leader by common consent, at a special conference session referred to as a "solemn assembly."

=== Life tenure ===
Each of the 15 men serving as apostles have life tenure, which may lead to an older or infirm church president, but also provides considerable training of apostles to take over the office of president.

=== Apostolic interregnums ===
Following the death of Joseph Smith, Brigham Young presided over the church for three years as the President of the Twelve before the First Presidency was reconstituted. The tradition of waiting for two to three years before selecting a new president continued until the 1898 death of the fourth church president, Wilford Woodruff. Since then, the surviving apostles have typically met in the Salt Lake Temple on the Sunday following the late president's funeral, to select and set apart the next church president.

=== Ideal of unanimity ===
Russell M. Nelson: "In our meetings, the majority never rules! We listen prayerfully to one another and talk with each other until we are united. Then when we have reached complete accord, the unifying influence of the Holy Ghost is spine-tingling! We experience what the Prophet Joseph Smith knew when he taught, 'By union of feeling we obtain power with God.'"

== Theological background; succession crisis of 1844 ==
According to LDS restorationist beliefs, a period of universal apostasy had followed the death of the Christ's original Twelve Apostles. Without such apostolic prophets left on the earth with possession of legitimate priesthood authority, many of the true teachings and practices of Christianity were lost. Eventually these were restored to Joseph Smith and others in a series of divine conferrals and ordinations by angels who held this authority during their lifetimes (see this partial list of restoration events). Joseph Smith and Oliver Cowdery said that the apostles Peter, James, and John appeared to them in 1829 and conferred upon them the Melchizedek priesthood and with it "the keys of the kingdom, and of the dispensation of the fullness of times."

At the death of Joseph Smith, the president of the Quorum of the Twelve was Brigham Young. Young stated that Smith had taught that the Quorum of the Twelve would become the governing body of the church after Smith's death.

After an apostolic interregnum, the First Presidency was reorganized in 1847, with Young as president. The Twelve again took on a supporting role within a chain of command under the First Presidency. It then became established that, with some similarities to papal conclaves by the College of Cardinals of the Roman Catholic Church, the LDS Church's Quorum of the Twelve would appoint successors upon each death of a church president.

== LDS historical precedents ==
Prior to 1889, whether succession was to proceed by apostolic seniority had not become a universal expectation. The History of apostolic succession within the LDS Church follows.

- From 1835 to 1843, seniority within the Quorum of the Twelve (then often called Council of the Twelve) was by age, that is, according to dates of birth. By 1843, Joseph Smith changed the criterion for seniority with regard to additions to the quorum to be determined by dates of calling to the quorum. In 1875, Brigham Young refined considerations of seniority through subtracting the duration of any interruptions in active service as an apostle. This adjustment by Young changed the seniority of apostles Orson Hyde and Orson Pratt, due to brief interruptions in their respective service with the quorum.
- The apostolic interregnum between Joseph Smith and Brigham Young was 3 years and 5 months. According to a personal journal comment early in this interregnum by Wilford Woodruff, no revelation to reorganize the First Presidency had been received at that time. The second interregnum, between Young and John Taylor, was 3 years and 1 month. The third interregnum, between Taylor and Woodruff, was 1 year and 8 months.

During this third interregnum, apostle Heber J. Grant proposed that fellow apostle Joseph F. Smith be set apart as church president (Smith was a son of Joseph Smith's brother, Hyrum Smith, and had junior tenure within the quorum at the time); however, the proposal did not gain sufficient support from the quorum for it to proceed. When the Quorum of the Twelve has failed to achieve unanimity with regard to any matters brought before it, a decision is made to wait prior to taking action. Notwithstanding consideration of other scenarios on occasion, in every succession to date, church leadership has passed to the individual considered to have the most senior tenure.

- In 1889, the next church president, Woodruff, advised the next senior-most apostle, Lorenzo Snow, to shorten the next interregnum going forward, to a matter of days. Describing the process of succession within the LDS Church's overall leadership in 1906 during the Smoot hearings, then-church president Joseph F. Smith described the then quite recently defined criteria of succession proceeding according by longest apostolic tenure as "a custom. There is no law in relation to it. It does not of necessity follow that the senior apostle would be or should be chosen[...]." Be that as it may, in practice, from 1889 until the present, the custom has become a universal expectation.
- Usually two counselors are called to serve along with the church president in the First Presidency but there could be more called. Furthermore, although the counselors are generally called from the Twelve, they don't have to be.
- John Willard Young and Brigham Young, Jr. were ordained as apostles in 1864. John started service as a counselor in the First Presidency under Brigham Young (1873–1877), while Brigham Jr. served in the Twelve starting in 1868. In 1900, Lorenzo Snow, George Q. Cannon, and Joseph F. Smith changed the definition of seniority so that seniority was based on time in the quorum of the twelve apostles, rather than the time they were ordained apostles, as was previously done with the Youngs. The Youngs were moved down in seniority, making Joseph F. Smith next in line for the presidency instead of Brigham Young Jr.
- In the early period of the LDS Church, sustaining votes by the church's general membership was not pro forma. Owing Mormons' instilled values of faithful obedience toward their duly anointed leaders, from after the succession of Brigham Young to the present, at LDS Church general conferences or other assemblies, prospective church leaderships presented to the church-membership receive nearly unanimously sustaining votes. Some critics contend that what gains as are achieved through such harmony may on occasion be offset by certain losses in dynamism.

== Galleries and timelines ==
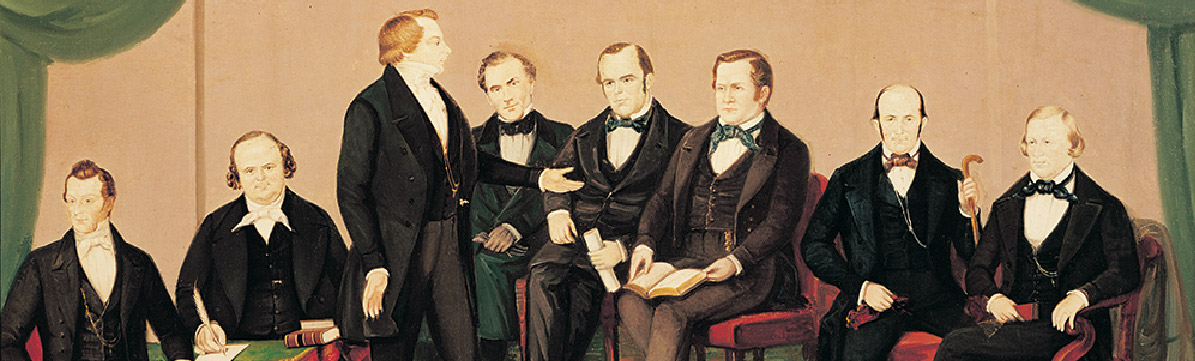
From left: Assistant President of the Church Hyrum Smith, apostle Willard Richards, church president Joseph Smith, apostles Orson Pratt, Parley Parker Pratt, Orson Hyde, Heber Chase Kimball, Brigham Young (1845 oil painting)
President of the Church of Jesus Christ of Latter Day Saints at the deaths of Joseph and Hyrum Smith

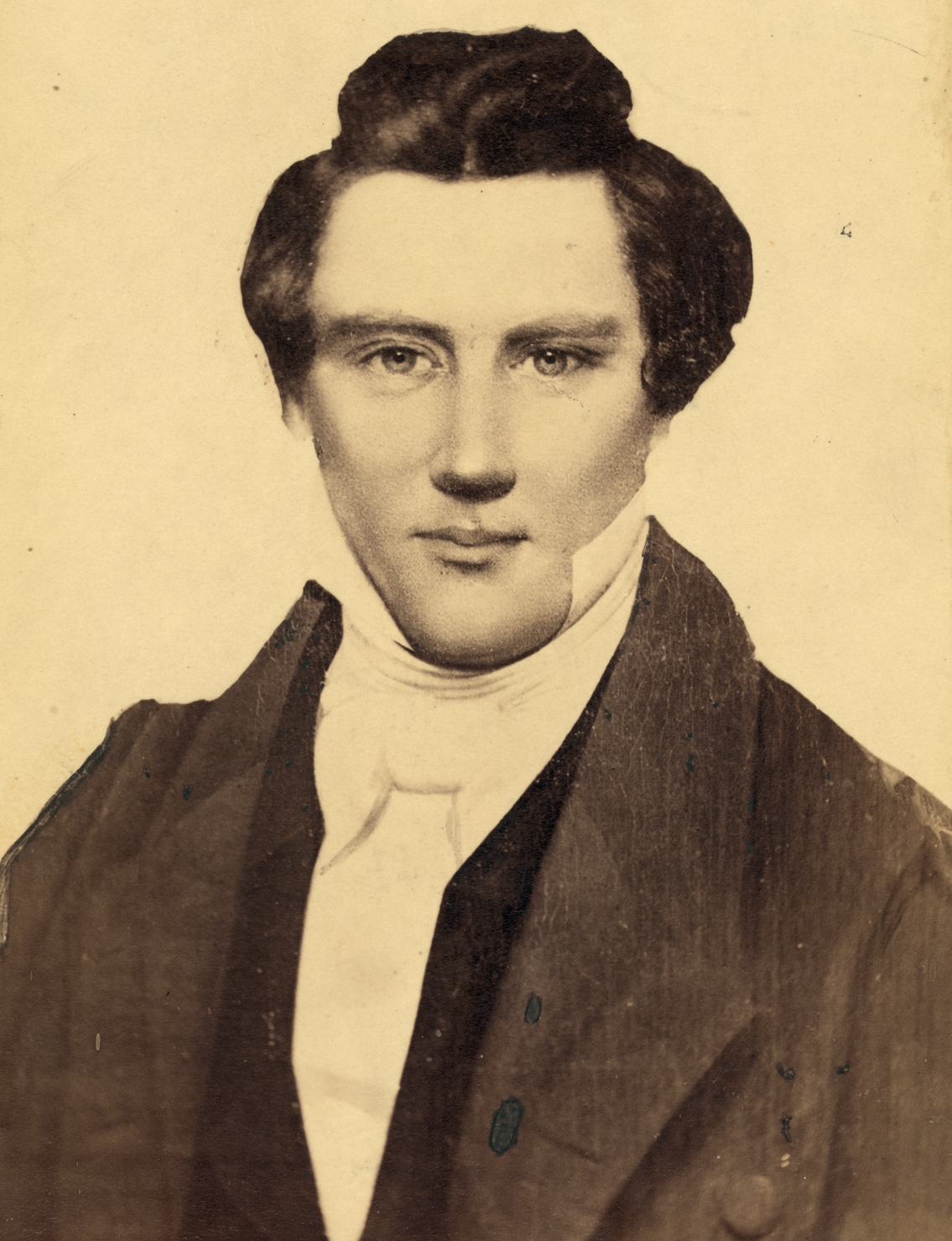
Joseph Smith
(age 38)
Church president: April 6, 1830 – June 27, 1844

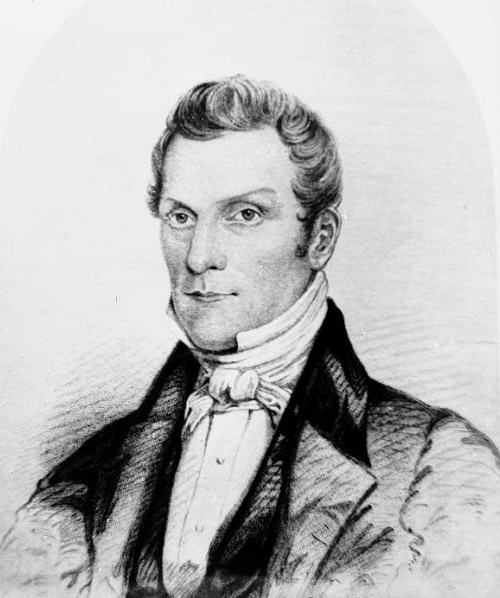
Hyrum Smith
(age 44)
Assistant President of the Church: January 24, 1841 – June 27, 1844
Quorum of the Twelve at the inaugural apostolic interregnum 1844–

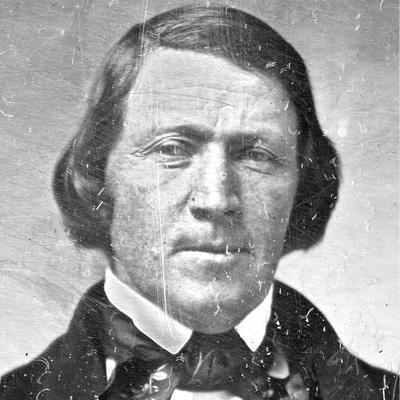
Brigham Young
(age 43)
February 14, 1835 – [December 27, 1847]

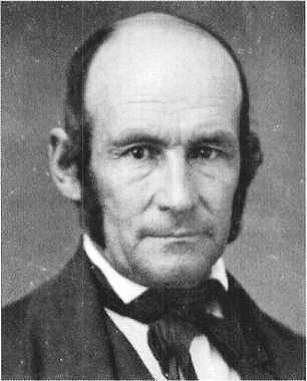
Heber C. Kimball
(age 43)
February 14, 1835 – [December 27, 1847]

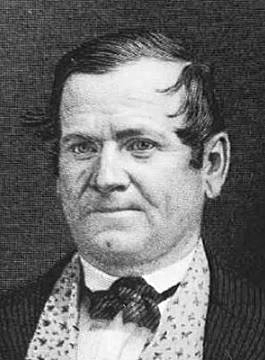
Orson Hyde
(age 39)
February 15, 1835 – May 4, 1839
June 27, 1839 – [November 28, 1878]

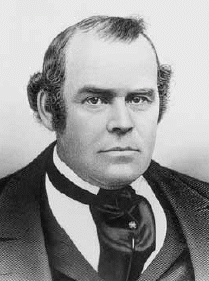
Parley Pratt
(age 37)
February 21, 1835 – [May 13, 1857]

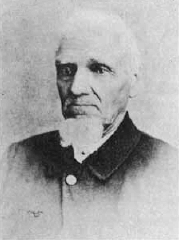
William Smith
(age 33
[note: photo circa 1862])
February 15, 1835 – May 4, 1839
May 25, 1839 – October 6, 1845

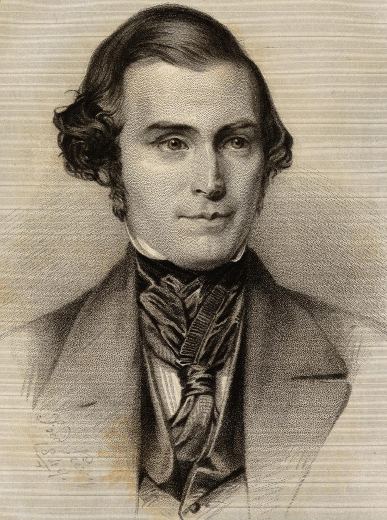
Orson Pratt
(age 32)
April 26, 1835 – August 20, 1842
January 20, 1843 – [October 3, 1881]

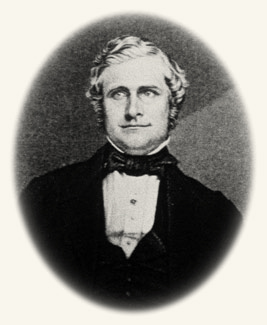
John Taylor
(age 35)
December 19, 1838 – [October 10, 1880]

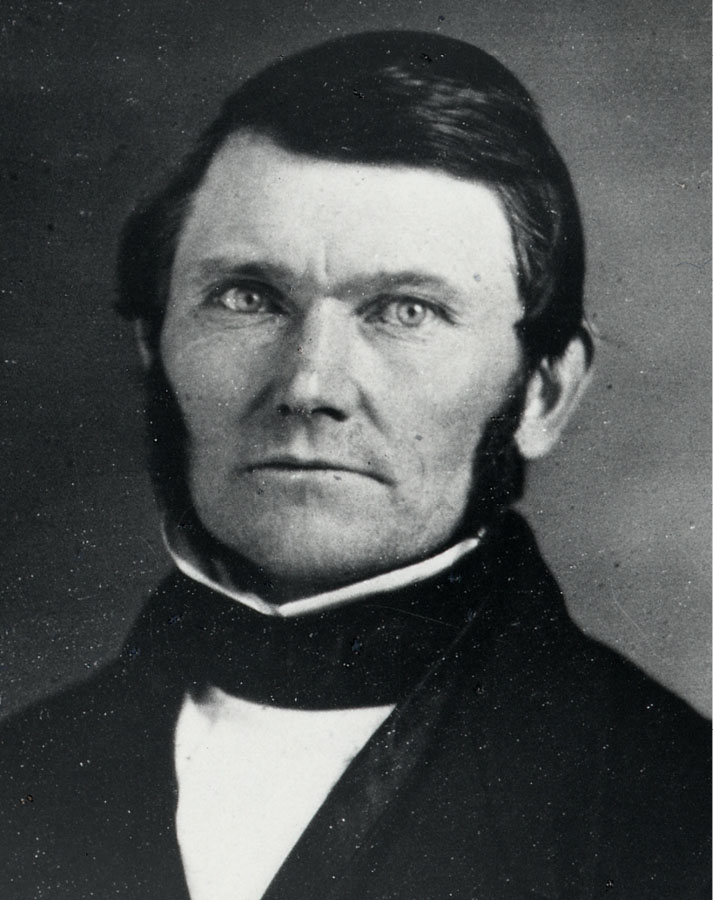
Wilford Woodruff
(age 37)
April 26, 1839 – [April 7, 1889]

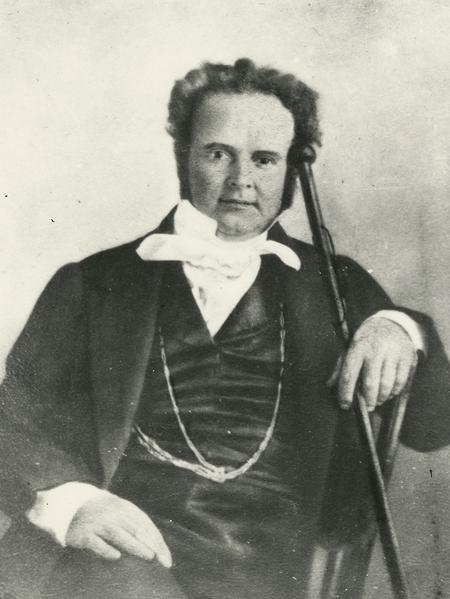
Willard Richards
(age 40)
April 14, 1840 – [December 27, 1847]

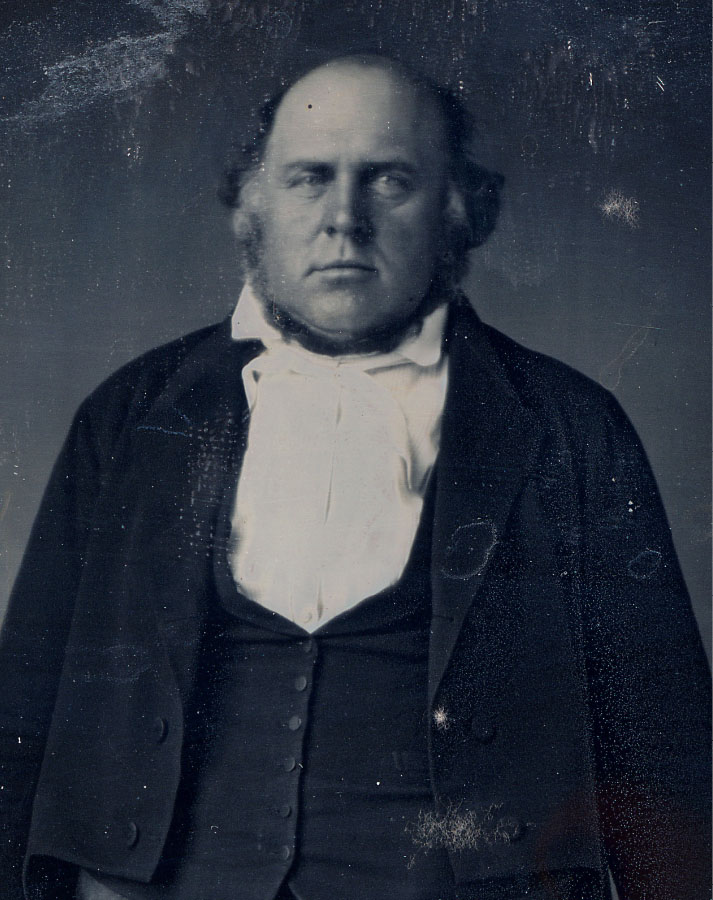
George A. Smith
(age 27)
April 26, 1839 – [October 7, 1868]

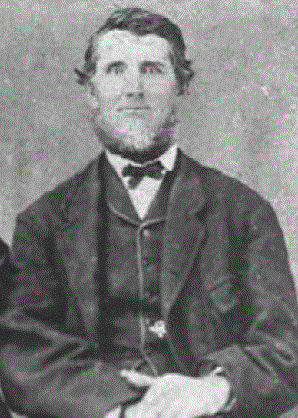
Lyman Wight
(age 48)
April 8, 1841 – [December 3, 1848]

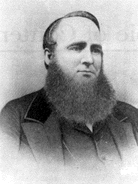
Amasa M. Lyman
(age 31)
August 20, 1842 – January 20, 1843
[October 6, 1845 – October 6, 1867]
Presidents of the Church of Jesus Christ of Latter-day Saints after Joseph Smith

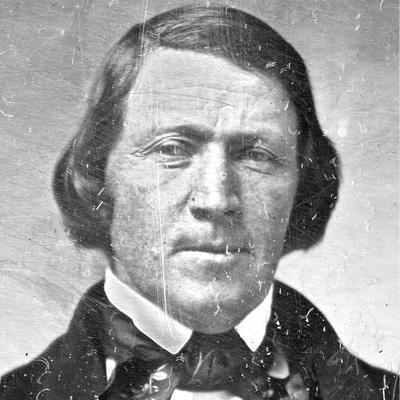
Brigham Young
December 27, 1847 – August 29, 1877

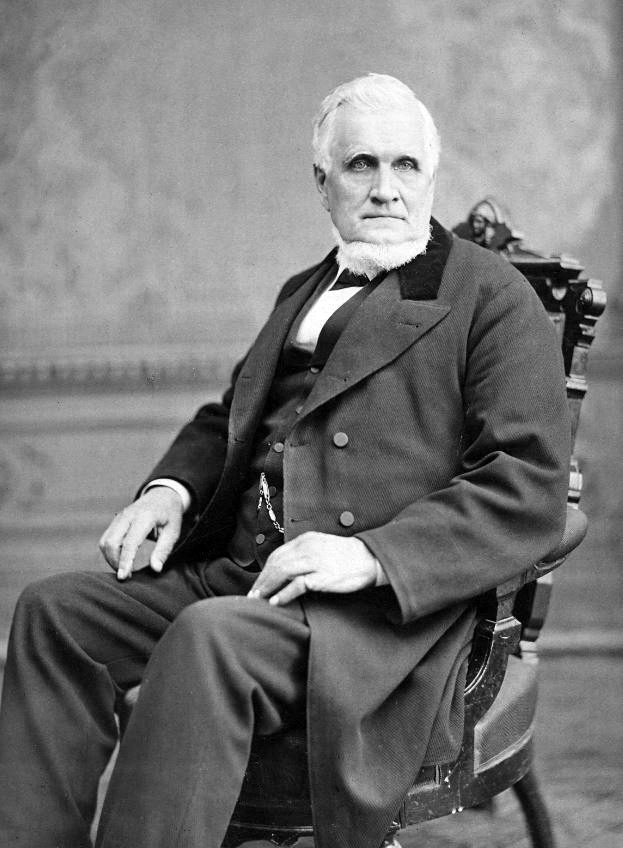
John Taylor
October 10, 1880 – July 25, 1887

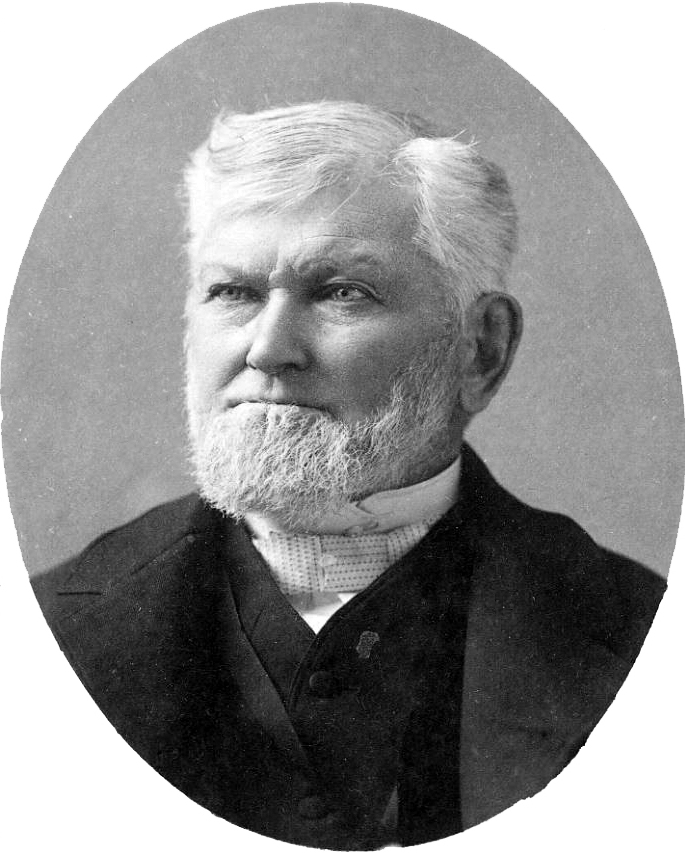
Wilford Woodruff
April 7, 1889 – September 2, 1898

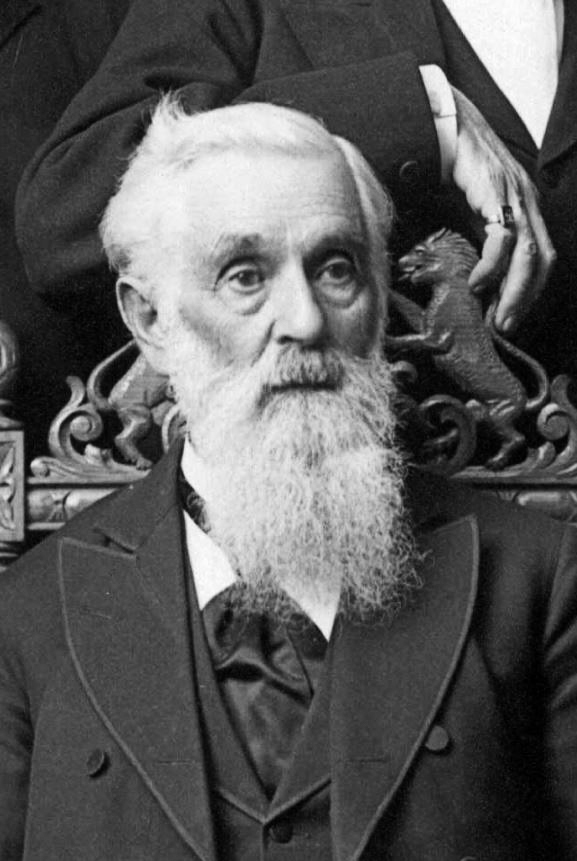
Lorenzo Snow
September 13, 1898 – October 10, 1901

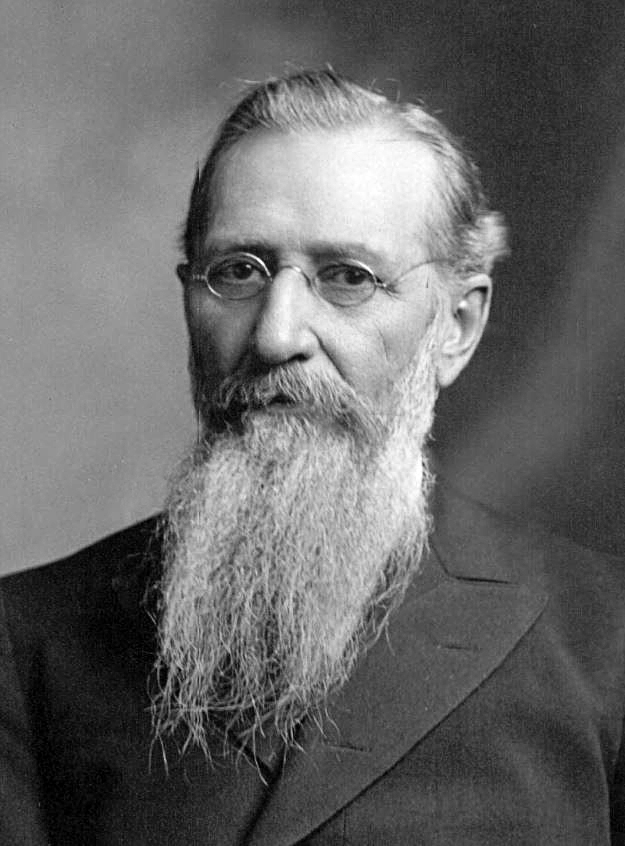
Joseph F. Smith
October 17, 1901 – November 19, 1918

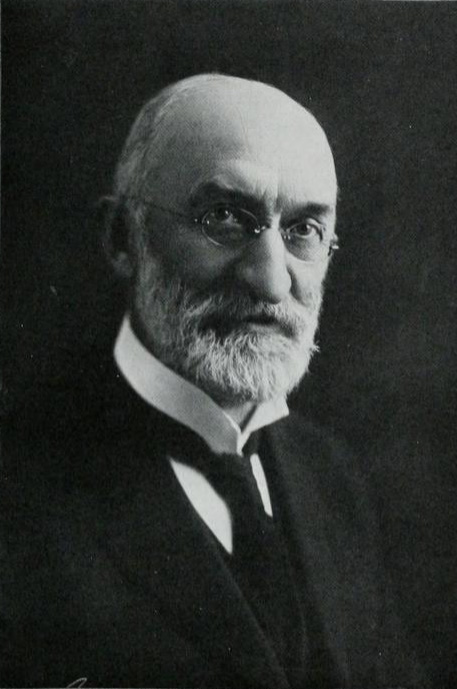
Heber J. Grant
November 23, 1918 – May 14, 1945

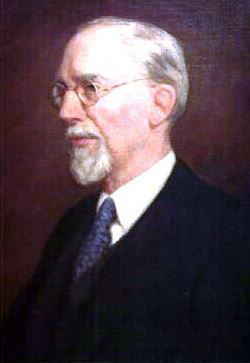
George Albert Smith
May 21, 1945 – April 4, 1951

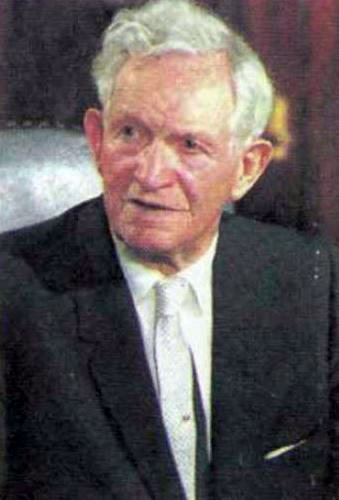
David O. McKay
April 9, 1951 – January 18, 1970

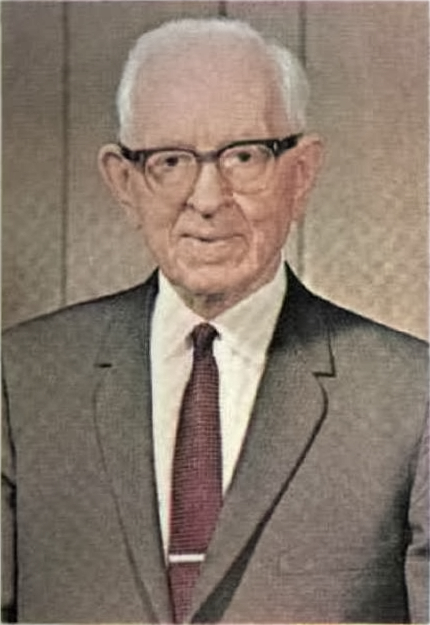
Joseph Fielding Smith
January 23, 1970 – July 2, 1972

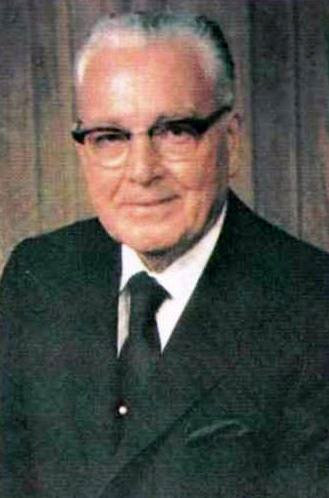
Harold B. Lee
July 7, 1972 – December 26, 1973

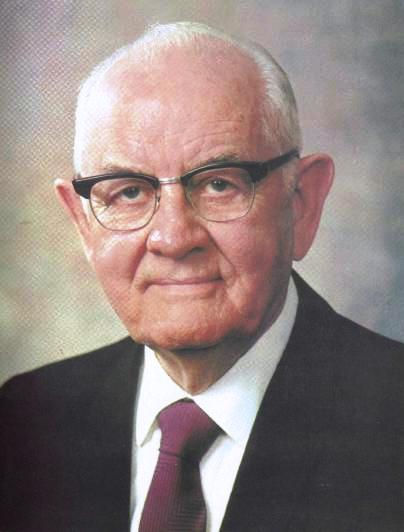
Spencer W. Kimball
December 30, 1973 – November 5, 1985

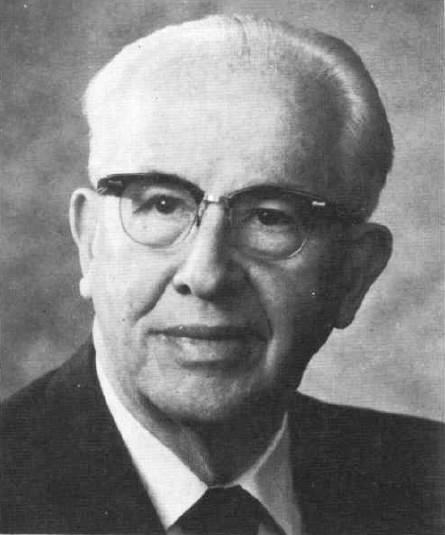
Ezra Taft Benson
November 10, 1985 – May 30, 1994

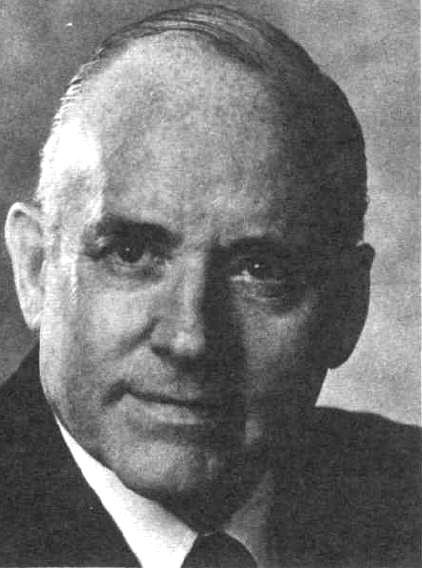
Howard W. Hunter
June 5, 1994 – March 3, 1995

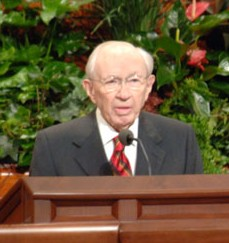
Gordon B. Hinckley
March 12, 1995 – January 27, 2008

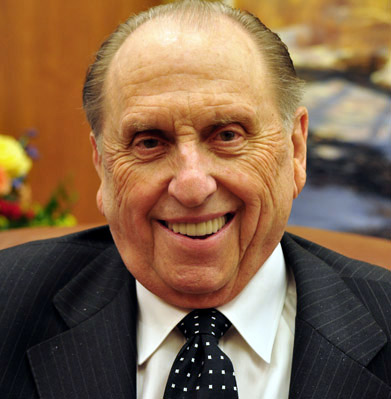
Thomas S. Monson
February 3, 2008 – January 2, 2018

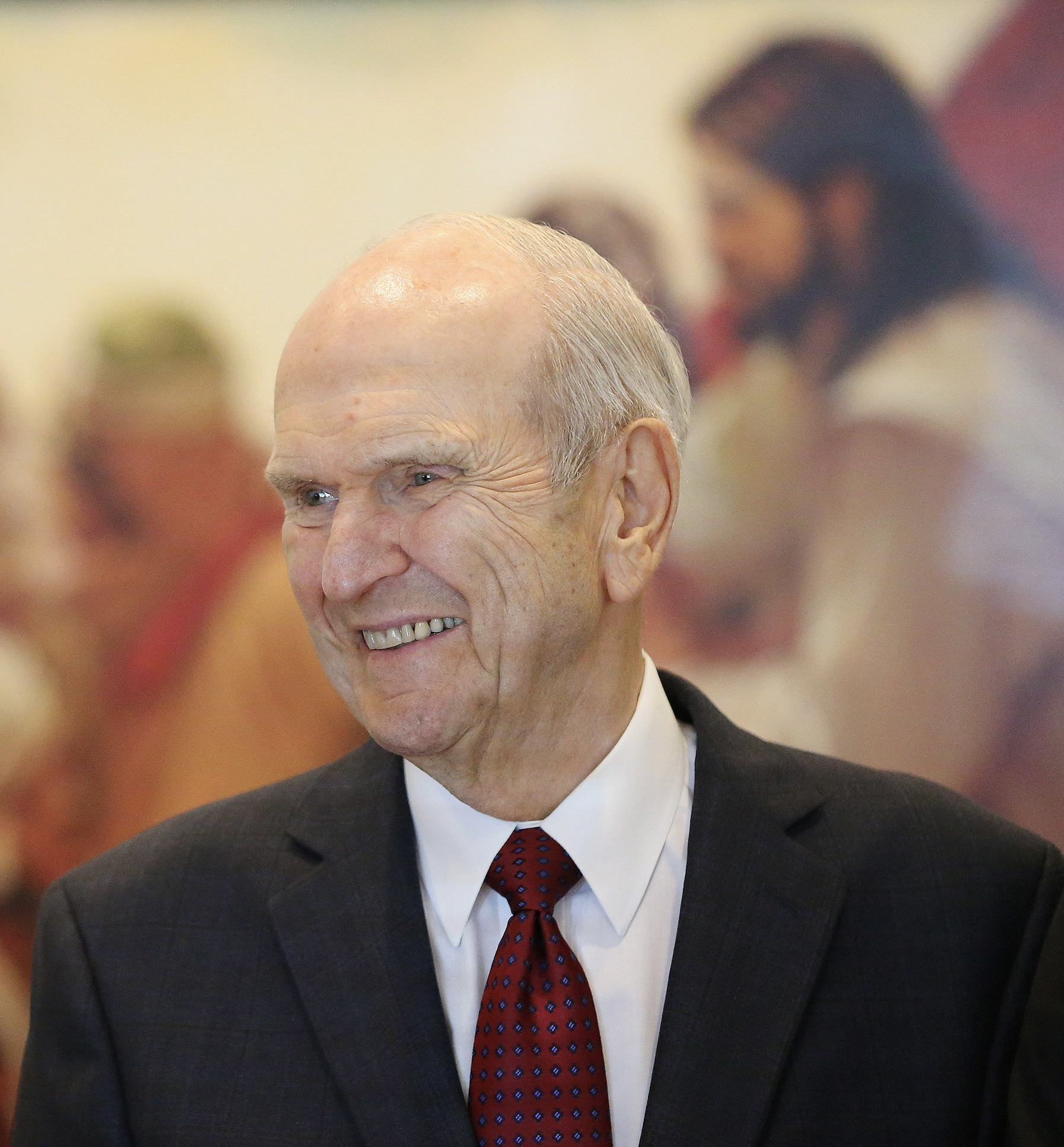
Russell M. Nelson
January 14, 2018 – September 27, 2025

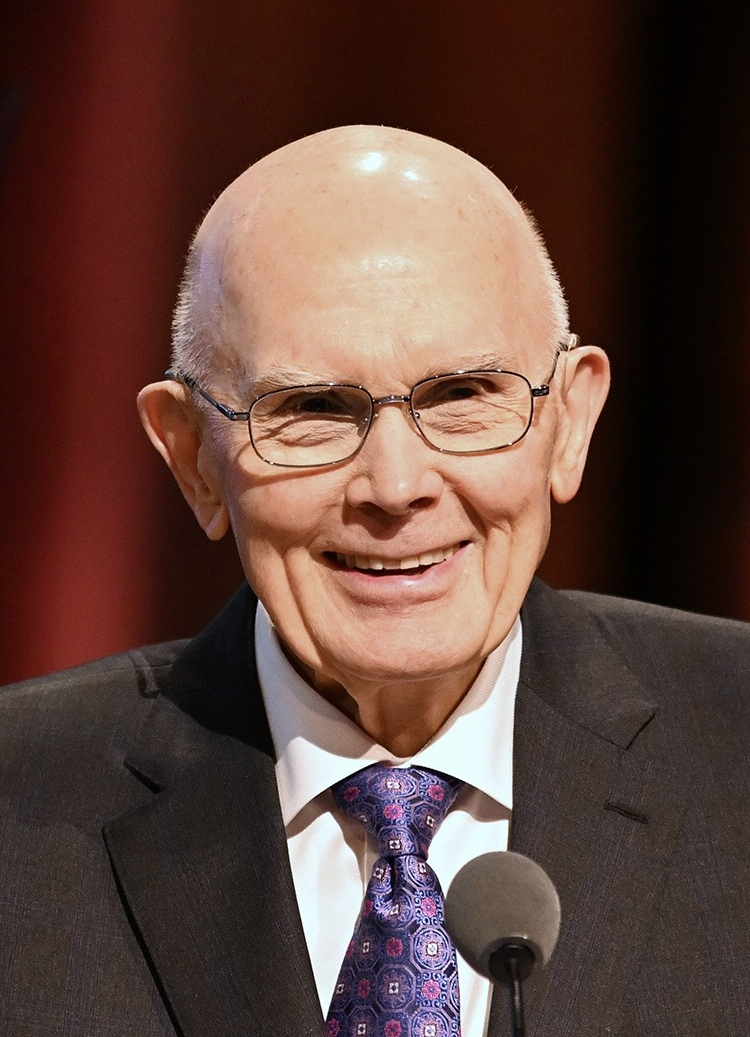
Dallin H. Oaks
October 14, 2025 – present

== See also ==
- Chronology of the First Presidency (LDS Church)
