= List of ambassadors of Sweden to Ghana =

Ambassador of Sweden to Ghana
- Lesser coat of arms of the Kingdom of Sweden
- Incumbent; Anna Westerholm since 2025
- Ministry for Foreign Affairs
- Style: His or Her Excellency (formal); Mr. or Madam Ambassador (informal)
- Reports to: Minister for Foreign Affairs; Swedish Embassy, Abuja
- Seat: Abuja, Nigeria (Note: The Swedish ambassador in Abuja, Nigeria is also accredited in Accra.)
- Appointer: Government of Sweden
- Term length: No fixed term
- Inaugural holder: Torsten Brandel
- Formation: 16 August 1961

The Ambassador of Sweden to Ghana (known formally as the Ambassador of the Kingdom of Sweden to the Republic of Ghana) is the official representative of the government of Sweden to the president of Ghana and the government of Ghana. As Sweden does not have an embassy in Accra, its ambassador in Abuja, Nigeria, is also accredited to Ghana.

== History ==
The British colony of the Gold Coast proclaimed its independence during festivities in Accra on 3–10 March 1957, and at the same time adopted the name Ghana. The Swedish government had received an invitation to be represented and appointed envoy Nils Ståhle to represent Sweden at the ceremonies in the capacity of ambassadeur en mission spéciale.

In May 1960, a Swedish delegation undertook a trip to West Africa in which nine countries were visited, including Ghana. The purpose of the journey was, among other things, to provide Swedish authorities with the supplementary information that was needed in order to comprehensively assess the appropriate extent of Swedish representation in this part of Africa. In January 1961, Sweden planned to establish three new diplomatic missions in Africa, including an independent mission in Monrovia, Liberia.

The proposed mission in Monrovia was intended to serve not only Liberia but also Ghana, Guinea, and Sierra Leone. A delegation recommended setting up at least two missions in West Africa, prioritizing Monrovia and Lagos. On 16 August 1961, Sweden's then newly appointed ambassador in Monrovia, Torsten Brandel, was also appointed ambassador to Ghana. Ambassador Brandel presented his credentials to President Kwame Nkrumah in October 1961. He thus became Sweden's first ambassador accredited to Ghana.

In 1967, accreditation for Ghana was transferred to the Swedish ambassador in Nigeria, who has since then been concurrently accredited to Ghana.

== List of representatives ==
Name	Period	Title	Notes	Presented credentials	Ref
First Republic of Ghana (1956–1966)
Torsten Brandel	16 August 1961 – 27 April 1962	Ambassador	Resident in Monrovia	October 1961	
Bo Järnstedt	1962–1964	Ambassador	Resident in Monrovia	27 April 1962	
Olof Ripa	1964–1966	Ambassador	Resident in Monrovia		
Second Republic of Ghana (1966–1979)
Olof Ripa	1966–1967	Ambassador	Resident in Monrovia		
Carl Swartz	1967–1969	Ambassador	Resident in Lagos		
Bertil Arvidson	1970–1972	Ambassador	Resident in Lagos		
Pierre Bothén	1973–1974	Ambassador	Resident in Lagos		
Karl-Anders Wollter	1974–1977	Ambassador	Resident in Lagos		
Vidar Hellners	1977–1979	Ambassador	Resident in Lagos		
Third Republic of Ghana (1979–1993)
Vidar Hellners	1979–1981	Ambassador	Resident in Lagos		
Bo Elfwendahl	1981–1985	Ambassador	Resident in Lagos		
Lave Johnsson	1986–1989	Ambassador	Resident in Lagos		
Göran Zetterqvist	1989–1992	Ambassador	Resident in Lagos		
Arne Ekfeldt	1992–1993	Ambassador	Resident in Lagos		
Fourth Republic of Ghana (1993–present)
Arne Ekfeldt	1993–1997	Ambassador	Resident in Lagos		
Lars Ekström	1997–2002	Ambassador	Resident in Lagos		
–	2003–2003	Ambassador	Vacant		
Birgitta Holst Alani	2004–2005	Ambassador	Resident in Lagos		
Lars-Owe Persson	2005–2008	Ambassador	Resident in Abuja		
Per Lindgärde	2008–2012	Ambassador	Resident in Abuja		
Svante Kilander	2012–2016	Ambassador	Resident in Abuja		
Inger Ultvedt	2016–2019	Ambassador	Resident in Abuja		
Carl Michael Gräns	2019–2022	Ambassador	Resident in Abuja		
Annika Hahn-Englund	September 2022 – 2025	Ambassador	Resident in Abuja		
Anna Westerholm	2025–present	Ambassador	Resident in Abuja		
