= Anna Westerholm =

Swedish Ambassador to Nigeria

- Anna Westerholm at the 2026 WikiGap Nigeria symposium
- Born: Sweden
- Education: Uppsala University
- Organization: Embassy of Sweden, Abuja
- Title: Ambassador of Sweden to Nigeria
- Predecessor: Annika Hahn-Englund
- Website: www.swedenabroad.se/en/embassies/nigeria-abuja/about-us/embassy-staff/

Anna Westerholm is a Swedish diplomat who has served as the ambassador of Sweden to Nigeria since 2025. She is also the Ambassador-designate to Ghana and Cameroon. She has served in various regions, including Eastern Europe, and Caucasus.

== Education ==
Anna Westerholm completed both her bachelor's and master's degrees at Uppsala University in Sweden. There, she obtained a bachelor's degree in social science and Russian studies and a master's degree in social science, development studies and Eastern European affairs. She also studied in Russia in 1992, where she obtained a diploma in the Russian language.

== Career ==
As a career diplomat, Westerholm served as Sweden's Ambassador for the Eastern Partnership from 2016 to 2022. Before then, she held the position of Director and Deputy Head of the Department for Multilateral Development Cooperation at the Ministry for Foreign Affairs (MFA). She has also worked as an analyst for the Swedish Armed Forces focusing on the Caucasus and Central Asia, and has held several positions with the Organization for Security and Co-operation in Europe (OSCE) in Estonia, Georgia, and the Republic of Moldova.

Her experience is not limited to diplomacy, as she has also served on boards. Since assuming her role as Swedish Ambassador to Nigeria, she has called for stronger Nordic–Nigerian partnerships that could foster a long-term ecosystem for innovation and digital transformation.

In January 2026, Westerholm led a delegation visiting the Nigeria recording label Chocolate City. In February 2026, she visited the University of Nigeria, when she led a Nordic delegation to the Enugu Tech Festival alongside the Consul-General of Denmark.

Ambassador Westerholm, in line with Swedish values, describes gender equality as a "cornerstone of democracy", saying that violence against women and girls "often silences their voices and undermines democratic values".

== See also ==
- List of diplomatic missions of Sweden
- Foreign relations of Sweden

Diplomatic posts
Preceded by Annika Hahn-Englund	Ambassador of Sweden to Nigeria; 2025–present	Succeeded by Incumbent
Preceded by Annika Hahn-Englund	Ambassador of Sweden to Ghana; 2025–present	Succeeded by Incumbent
Preceded by Annika Hahn-Englund	Ambassador of Sweden to Cameroon; 2025–present	Succeeded by Incumbent
