= Annika Hahn-Englund =

Swedish diplomat

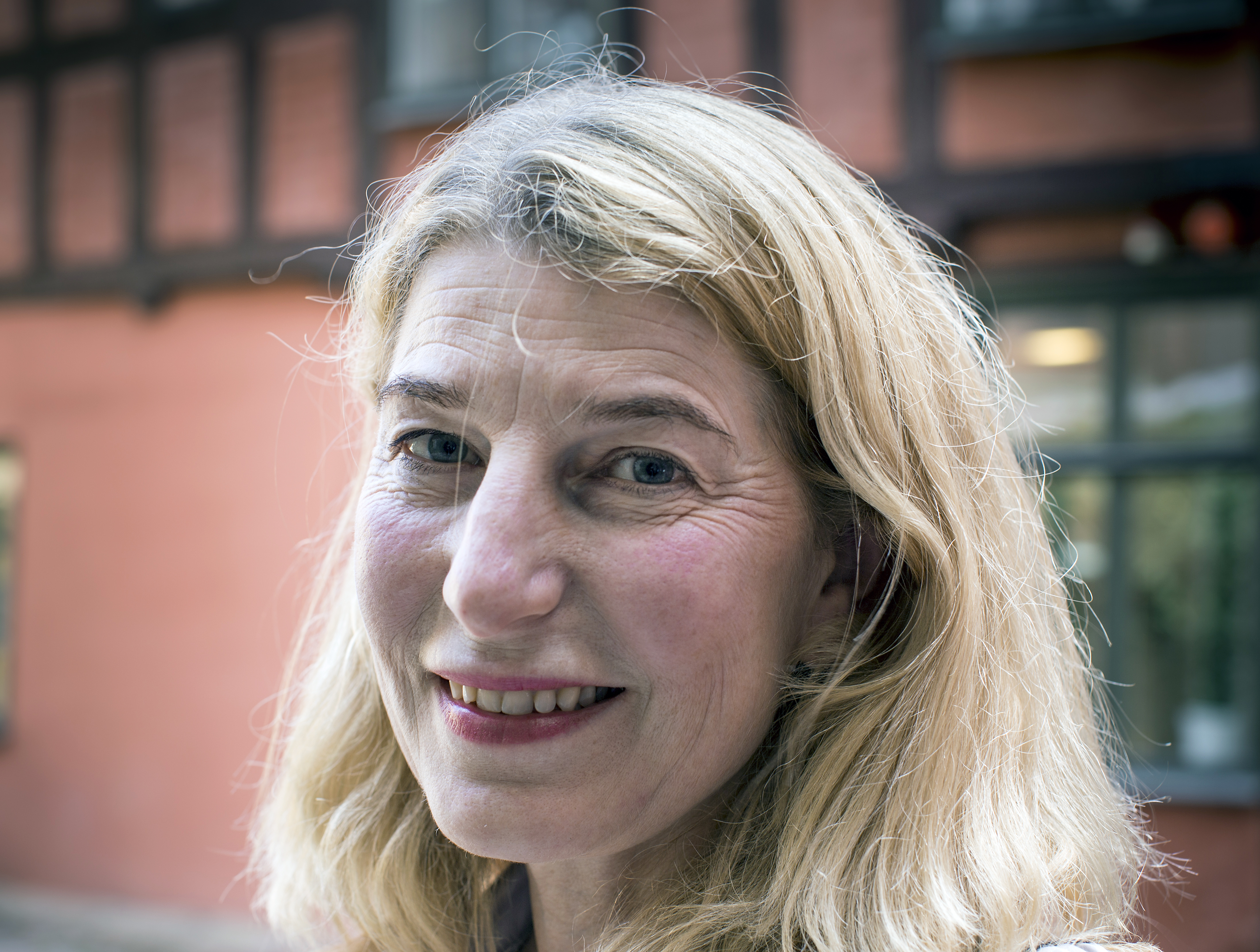

Ambassador of Sweden to Nigeria
- In office September 2022 – 2025
- Monarch: Carl XVI Gustaf
- Prime Minister: Ulf Kristersson
- Preceded by: Carl Michael Gräns
- Succeeded by: Anna Westerholm

Ambassador Extraordinary and Plenipotentiary to Ghana, Cameroon and ECOWAS
- Incumbent
- Assumed office 2023
- Monarch: Carl XVI Gustaf
- Prime Minister: Ulf Kristersson

Ambassador Extraordinary and Plenipotentiary to Belgium and Luxembourg
- In office 2016–2021
- Monarch: Carl XVI Gustaf
- Prime Minister: Stefan Löfven
- Preceded by: Maria Christina Lundqvist
- Succeeded by: Annika Molin Hellgren

Personal details
- Citizenship: Sweden
- Education: Stockholm School of Economics

Annika Hahn-Englund is a Swedish diplomat who served as the ambassador of Sweden to Nigeria from 2022 to 2025. and West Africa. She served as Sweden's ambassador to Belgium and Luxembourg (2016–2021) and as the ambassador of Nordic Cooperation at the Swedish Ministry for Foreign Affairs (2014–2016).

== Education ==
She has a Master of Science in Business and Economics (Civilekonomexamen) degree from the Stockholm School of Economics.

== Career ==
Hahn-Englund joined the Swedish Ministry for Foreign Affairs in 1988. Earlier in her career, she served as the Second Secretary at the Embassy of Sweden in Beijing, China (1989–1992) and as the First Secretary at the Embassy of Sweden in Bonn, Germany (1995–1997).

Among other things, Hahn-Englund worked at Sweden's EU representation in Brussels and at the General Secretariat of the European Parliament and Commission (2002–2009) and at the Prime Minister's Office, Stockholm, Sweden (2009–2010).

Between 2014 and 2016, she was the ambassador of Nordic Cooperation at the Swedish Ministry for Foreign Affairs and thereafter served as Sweden's ambassador to Belgium and Luxembourg (2016–2021).

In 2022, she was appointed the ambassador of Sweden to Nigeria, Ghana, Cameroon and ECOWAS, taking over from Carl Michael Gräns. She was replaced in 2025 by Anna Westerholm.

In March 2025, she was appointed as General Consul of Sweden in Shanghai.

Diplomatic posts
Preceded by Maria Christina Lundqvist	Ambassador of Sweden to Belgium; 2016–2021	Succeeded by Annika Molin Hellgren
Preceded by Maria Christina Lundqvist	Ambassador of Sweden to Luxembourg; 2016–2021	Succeeded by Annika Molin Hellgren
Preceded by Carl Michael Gräns	Ambassador of Sweden to Nigeria; 2022–2025	Succeeded by Anna Westerholm
Preceded by Carl Michael Gräns	Ambassador of Sweden to Ghana; 2022–2025	Succeeded by Anna Westerholm
Preceded by Carl Michael Gräns	Ambassador of Sweden to Cameroon; 2022–2025	Succeeded by Anna Westerholm
Preceded by Marie-Claire Swärd Capra	Consul General of Sweden to Shanghai; 2025–present	Succeeded by Incumbent
