= List of ambassadors of Sweden to Cameroon =

Ambassador of Sweden to Cameroon
- Lesser coat of arms of the Kingdom of Sweden
- Incumbent; Anna Westerholm since 2025
- Ministry for Foreign Affairs
- Style: His or Her Excellency (formal); Mr. or Madam Ambassador (informal)
- Reports to: Minister for Foreign Affairs; Swedish Embassy, Abuja
- Seat: Abuja, Nigeria (Note: The Swedish ambassador in Abuja, Nigeria is also accredited in Yaoundé.)
- Appointer: Government of Sweden
- Term length: No fixed term
- Inaugural holder: Dag Malm
- Formation: 1965

The Ambassador of Sweden to Cameroon (known formally as the Ambassador of the Kingdom of Sweden to the Republic of Cameroon) is the official representative of the government of Sweden to the president of Cameroon and government of Cameroon. Since Sweden does not have an embassy in Yaoundé, Sweden's ambassador in Abuja, Nigeria, is also accredited to Yaoundé, the capital of Cameroon.

== History ==
The French colony of French Cameroon became independent as the Republic of Cameroon on 1 January 1960. On the occasion of its declaration of independence, Swedish Foreign Minister Östen Undén sent a congratulatory telegram to Prime Minister Ahmadou Ahidjo, stating that the Swedish government recognized Cameroon as a sovereign and independent state and expressing the hope for friendly and cordial relations between the two countries. Ambassador Lennart Petri, who in his capacity as ambassadeur en mission spéciale represented Sweden at the celebrations in Cameroon, was tasked with conveying the good wishes of King Gustaf VI Adolf. Among the guests of honor at the festivities was, among others, the Secretary-General of the United Nations Dag Hammarskjöld.

A thank-you telegram has been received by the King from Cameroon in Africa, which became independent on 1 January 1960. The telegram was sent by Prime Minister Ahidjo, who expresses his pleasure that Sweden was represented at the independence celebrations and that His Majesty gave thought to Cameroon on this historic occasion. Prime Minister Ahidjo also conveys his best wishes to the King and expresses hopes for a fruitful and friendly cooperation between Sweden and Cameroon.

In May 1960, a Swedish delegation undertook a trip to West Africa in which nine countries were visited, including Cameroon. The purpose of the journey was, among other things, to provide Swedish authorities with the supplementary information that was needed in order to comprehensively assess the appropriate extent of Swedish representation in this part of Africa.

In January 1961, it was proposed in the government budget bill that the Swedish consulate in Léopoldville, Republic of the Congo be replaced by an embassy. In September 1965, an agreement was reached between Sweden and Cameroon on the establishment of diplomatic relations, and the ambassador in Léopoldville, Dag Malm, was appointed Sweden's first ambassador to Yaoundé. In January 1966, Ambassador Malm presented his letter of credence to Cameroon's president, Ahmadou Ahidjo.

Sweden's ambassador to Cameroon has been cross-accredited from Léopoldville/Kinshasa, Democratic Republic of the Congo during 1965–1983 and 2002–2019, from Stockholm, Sweden during 1983–2001, and from Abuja, Nigeria since 2019.

== List of representatives ==
Name	Period	Title	Resident / Concurrent accreditation	Notes	Presented credentials	Ref
Dag Malm	1965–1967	Ambassador	Resident in Léopoldville		January 1966	
Olof Bjurström	1967–1971	Ambassador	Resident in Kinshasa			
Henrik Ramel	1972–1976	Ambassador	Resident in Kinshasa			
Ragnar Petri	1977–1979	Ambassador	Resident in Kinshasa			
Karl Henrik Andersson	1980–1984	Ambassador	Resident in Kinshasa (1980–83) and Stockholm (1983–84)			
Olof Skoglund	1985–1990	Ambassador	Resident in Stockholm			
–	1991–1991	Ambassador		Vacant		
Carl-Erhard Lindahl	1992–2001	Ambassador	Resident in Stockholm			
Robert Rydberg	2002–2003	Ambassador	Resident in Kinshasa			
Magnus Wernstedt	2004–2007	Ambassador	Resident in Kinshasa			
Helena Rietz	2007–2008	Ambassador	Resident in Kinshasa			
Johan Borgstam	2009–2011	Ambassador	Resident in Kinshasa			
?	2011–2013	Ambassador				
Annika Ben David	2013–2016	Ambassador	Resident in Kinshasa		15 September 2015 (Note: On 15 September 2015, letter of credence were presented to the Minister of External Relations Pierre Moukoko Mbonjo. The letter of credence to President Paul Biya were presented at a later date.)	
Maria Håkansson	2017–2019	Ambassador	Resident in Kinshasa			
Carl Michael Gräns	2019–2022	Ambassador	Resident in Abuja		14 October 2020	
Annika Hahn-Englund	2022–2025	Ambassador	Resident in Abuja		22 November 2023	
Anna Westerholm	2025–present	Ambassador	Resident in Abuja			
