= Carl Michael Gräns =

Swedish diplomat

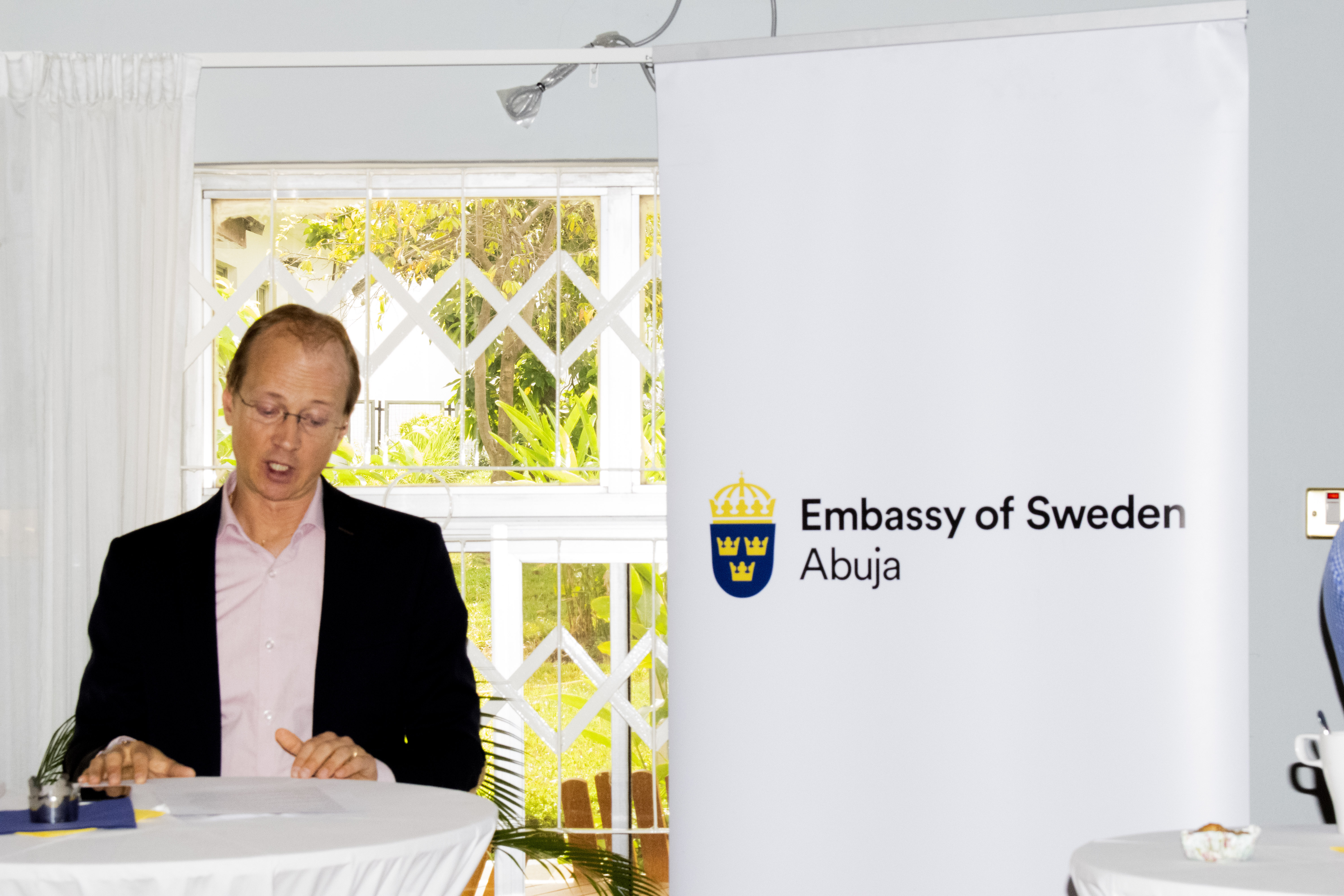

Ambassador of Sweden to Nigeria, Ghana, Cameroon
- In office January 2019 – September 2022
- Monarch: Carl XVI Gustaf
- Prime Minister: Stefan Löfven
- Succeeded by: Annika Hahn-Englund

Personal details
- Born: 26 July 1970 (age 56)
- Citizenship: Sweden
- Education: Stockholm School of Economics; Uppsala University

Carl Michael Gräns (born 26 July 1970) is a Swedish diplomat and author, who served as the ambassador of Sweden to Nigeria, Ghana and Cameroon from 2019 to 2022. He also served as the deputy head of unit at the Ministry for Foreign Affairs' unit for Europe and North America.

== Education ==
Gräns studied at the Stockholm School of Economics and graduated in 1997 with a masters degree. He has a B.A. degree with Russian as a major at Uppsala University where he graduated in 2003.

== Career ==
Gräns was admitted to the Ministry for Foreign Affairs' diplomatic programme and began his service at the Ministry for Foreign Affairs in 2000. He has served in the ministry all his career with the exception of the year 2022-2023 when he was seconded to the Swedish Defence Research Agency as a senior Russia analyst. Gräns has alternated his service at the Ministry for Foreign Affairs in Stockholm with service abroad at Swedish embassies in Vilnius, Lithuania (Second Secretary 2000-2003), Paris (First Secretary/Counsellor 2004-2010), Berlin (Press Counsellor 2015-2019), Abuja (Ambassador 2019-2022). As an ambassador to Nigeria, he was also an ambassador to Ghana, Cameroon, and ECOWAS. As ambassador to Nigeria, Gräns pushed for gender equality in Nigeria, referring to it as a means to stimulate more development in Africa. In February 2022, he inaugurated the honorary consulate of Sweden in Lagos.

== Bibliography ==
- Upp och ut

Diplomatic posts
Preceded by Inger Ultvedt	Ambassador of Sweden to Nigeria; 2019–2022	Succeeded by Annika Hahn-Englund
Preceded by Inger Ultvedt	Ambassador of Sweden to Ghana; 2019–2022	Succeeded by Annika Hahn-Englund
Preceded by Maria Håkansson	Ambassador of Sweden to Cameroon; 2019–2022	Succeeded by Annika Hahn-Englund
