= List of ambassadors of Sweden to Nigeria =

Ambassador of Sweden to Nigeria
- Lesser coat of arms of the Kingdom of Sweden
- Incumbent; Anna Westerholm since 2025
- Ministry for Foreign Affairs; Swedish Embassy, Abuja
- Style: His or Her Excellency (formal); Mr. or Madam Ambassador (informal)
- Reports to: Minister for Foreign Affairs
- Seat: Abuja, Nigeria
- Appointer: Government of Sweden
- Term length: No fixed term
- Formation: 1961
- First holder: Love Kellberg
- Website: Swedish Embassy, Abuja

The Ambassador of Sweden to Nigeria (known formally as the Ambassador of the Kingdom of Sweden to the Federal Republic of Nigeria) is the official representative of the government of Sweden to the president of Nigeria and government of Nigeria.

== History ==
In conjunction with Nigeria's declaration of independence on 1 October 1960, Swedish Foreign Minister Östen Undén sent a congratulatory telegram to Nigerian Prime Minister Sir Abubakar Tafawa Balewa, stating that the Swedish government recognized Nigeria as a sovereign and independent state. Undén expressed the Swedish government's desire to maintain friendly and cordial relations with Nigeria. Simultaneously, a congratulatory telegram was also sent by the King of Sweden.

In early September 1961, Sweden established an embassy in Lagos, Nigeria. Love Kellberg, the head of a department in the Ministry for Foreign Affairs, was appointed as Sweden's first ambassador to Nigeria. On 3 October 1961, Kellberg presented his credentials to Governor-General Nnamdi Azikiwe. In January 1962, Kellberg, who was also accredited as ambassador to Porto-Novo in the Republic of Dahomey, presented his credentials to President Hubert Maga, along with a gift from the King of Sweden.

Sweden's ambassador to Nigeria has, at various times, also been accredited to neighboring countries such as Benin, Burkina Faso, Cameroon, Ghana, Niger, Togo, and The Gambia.

== List of representatives ==
Name	Period	Title	Notes	Presented credentials	Ref
Federation of Nigeria (1954–1963)
Love Kellberg	1961–1963	Ambassador	Dual accreditation to Porto-Novo.		
First Nigerian Republic (1963–1966)
Marc Giron	1963–1966	Ambassador			
Military dictatorship (1966–1979)
Carl Swartz	1966–1969	Ambassador	Dual accreditation to Accra (from 1967), Niamey (from 1967), Ouagadougou (from 1967), and Porto-Novo (from 1968).		
Bertil Arvidson	1969–1972	Ambassador	Dual accreditation to Accra (from 1970), Niamey, Ouagadougou, and Porto-Novo (from 1970).		
Pierre Bothén	1973–1974	Ambassador	Dual accreditation to Accra, Niamey, Ouagadougou, and Porto-Novo.		
Karl-Anders Wollter	1974–1977	Ambassador	Dual accreditation to Accra, Niamey (from 1976), Ouagadougou (until 1976), and Porto-Novo (from 1976).		
Vidar Hellners	1977–1979	Ambassador	Dual accreditation to Accra, Cotonou, and Ouagadougou (until 1978).		
Second Nigerian Republic (1979–1983)
Vidar Hellners	1979–1981	Ambassador	Dual accreditation to Accra, Cotonou, Ouagadougou, and Lomé (from 1979).		
Bo Elfwendahl	1981–1983	Ambassador	Dual accreditation to Accra.		
Military dictatorship (1983–1993, 1993–1999)
Bo Elfwendahl	1983–1985	Ambassador	Dual accreditation to Accra.		
Lave Johnsson	1985–1989	Ambassador	Dual accreditation to Accra (from 1986).		
Göran Zetterqvist	1989–1992	Ambassador	Dual accreditation to Accra.		
Arne Ekfeldt	1992–1997	Ambassador	Dual accreditation to Accra.		
Lars Ekström	1997–1999	Ambassador	Dual accreditation to Accra. (Note: Sveriges statskalender lists Lars Ekström as accredited to Ghana, Benin, and Togo from 1997, which is most likely a misprint. Ambassador Bo Wilén in Ivory Coast was accredited to Benin and Togo from 1996 to 1999 according to the 1999 edition of Sveriges statskalender as well as in Vem är det (2000). Ekström was most likely accredited to Benin and Togo from the year 2000, as the same source states that Ekström was accredited to Niger from that year and that Bo Wilén left the post in 1999.)		
Fourth Nigerian Republic (1999–present)
Lars Ekström	1999–2002	Ambassador	Dual accreditation to Accra, Cotonou (from 2000), Niamey (from 2000), and Lomé (from 2000).		
Birgitta Holst Alani	2002–2005	Ambassador	Dual accreditation to Accra (from 2004), Cotonou, Niamey, and Lomé.		
Lars-Owe Persson	2005–2008	Ambassador	Dual accreditation to Accra, Cotonou, Niamey, and Lomé.		
Per Lindgärde	2008–2012	Ambassador	Dual accreditation to Accra, Banjul (from 2010 (Note: After the Swedish embassy in Dakar, Senegal closed in 2010, Ambassador Per Lindgärde to Nigeria was also accredited to Gambia.)), Cotonou, Niamey, and Lomé.		
Svante Kilander	2012–2016	Ambassador	Dual accreditation to Accra, Banjul, Cotonou (until 2015), and Lomé.		
Inger Ultvedt	2016–2019	Ambassador	Dual accreditation to Accra.		
Carl Michael Gräns	2019–2022	Ambassador	Dual accreditation to Accra and Yaoundé.		
Annika Hahn-Englund	September 2022 – 2025	Ambassador	Dual accreditation to Accra and Yaoundé.		
Anna Westerholm	2025–present	Ambassador	Dual accreditation to Accra and Yaoundé.	4 December 2025	

== Gallery ==
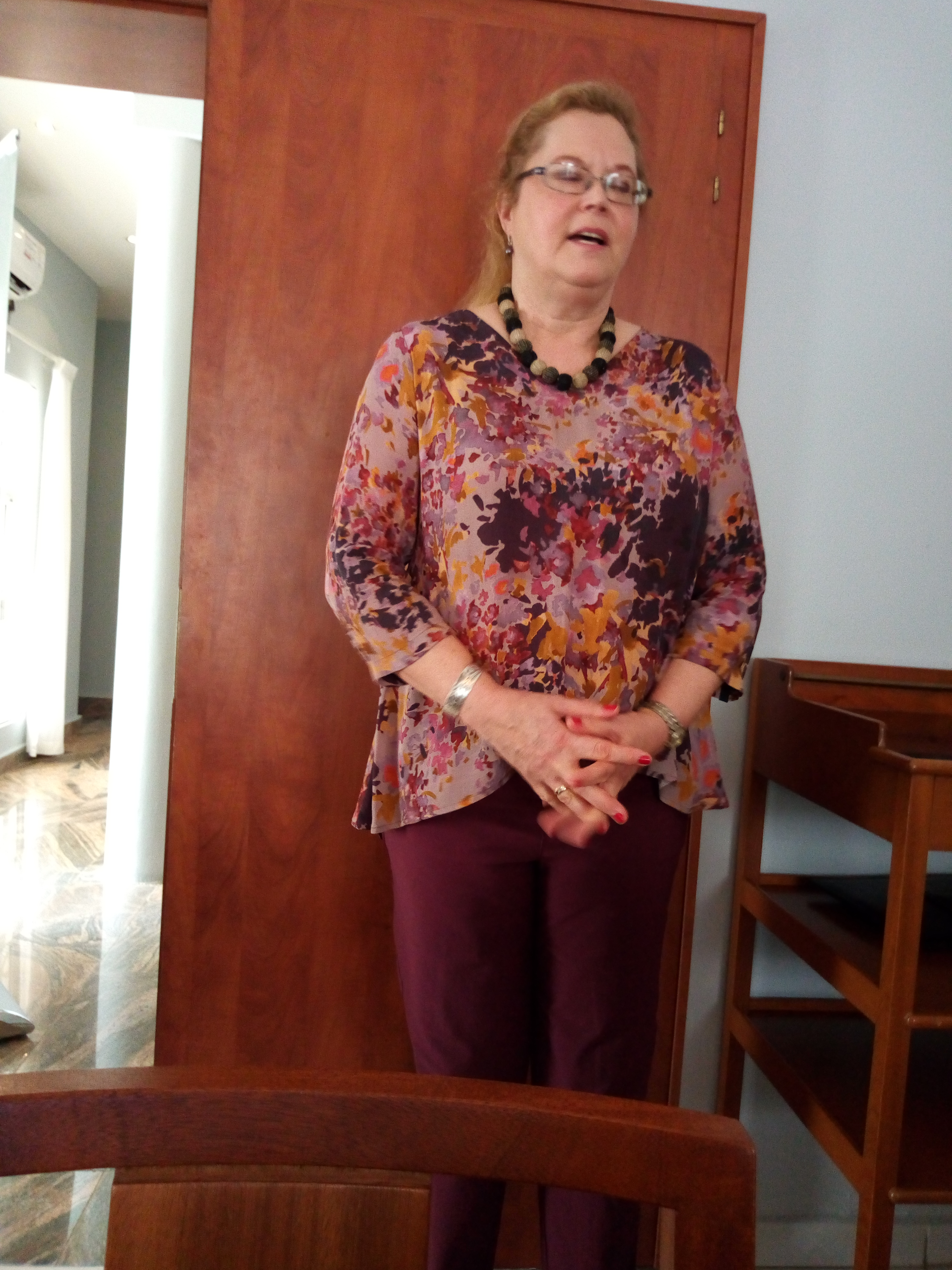
Ambassador Inger Ultvedt (2016–2019).

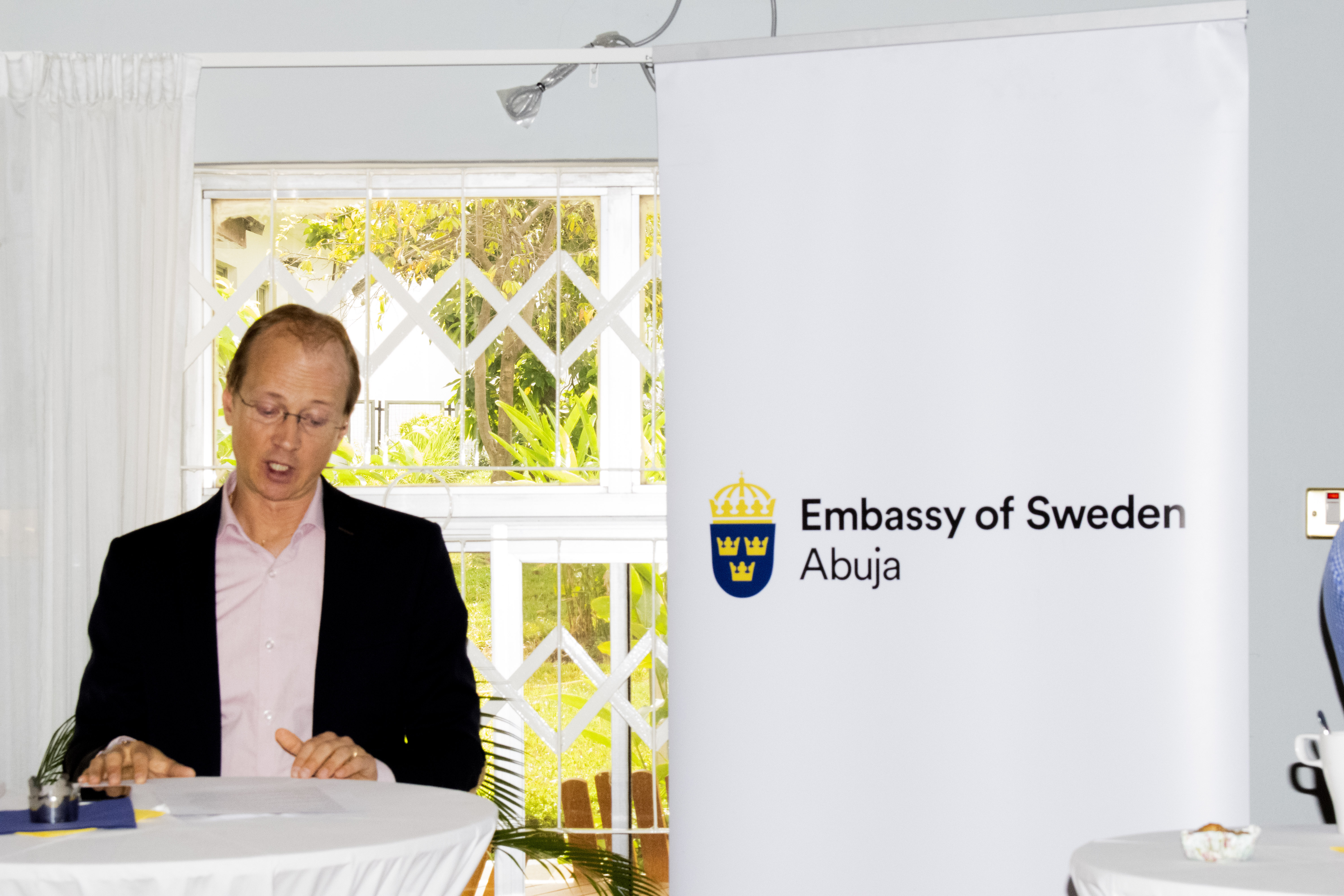
Ambassador Carl Michael Gräns (2019–2022).
